= Outline of Puntland =

Overview of and topical guide to Puntland

Flag of Puntland

Coat of arms of Puntland

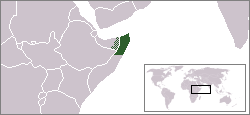
Location of Puntland

Puntland (Somali: Puntland, Arabic: أرض البنط), officially the Puntland State (Somali: Maamul-Goboleedka Puntland), is a State in Somalia. Puntland announced on 31 March 2024 that it would withdraw its recognition of the federal government and "exercise the powers of an independent state" due to a constitutional dispute, while reaffirming its commitment to remaining part of Somalia. Garowe serves as the administrative capital of Puntland, an autonomous region within Somalia.

Citing a constitutional crisis in Somalia, Puntland announced it had withdrawn recognition of the federal government and would govern itself independently until constitutional amendments are approved by referendum. The region, a Federal Member State of Somalia, is located at the tip of the Horn of Africa.

A third of Somalia's population lives in the state, which contains about a third of the nation's geographical area.

The name "Puntland" is derived from the Land of Punt mentioned by ancient Egyptian sources. However, the exact location of the fabled territory is still a mystery. Many studies suggest that the Land of Punt was located in Somalia, whereas others propose that it was situated elsewhere.

The following outline is provided as an overview of and topical guide to Puntland. Part of Puntland is ex-Majertenia Sultanate, According to the Constitution of Puntland, Puntland consists of 9 regions:

1. Bari
2. Haylaan
3. Karkaar
4. Mudug
5. Nugaal
6. Ra'as Aseir
7. Sanaag

== General reference ==
- Common English regional name: Puntland
- Common endonym(s): Puntlaand
- Official endonym(s): أرض البنط
- ISO country codes: See the Outline of Somalia
- ISO region codes: See the Outline of Somalia
- Internet country code top-level domain: .so

== Geography of Puntland ==
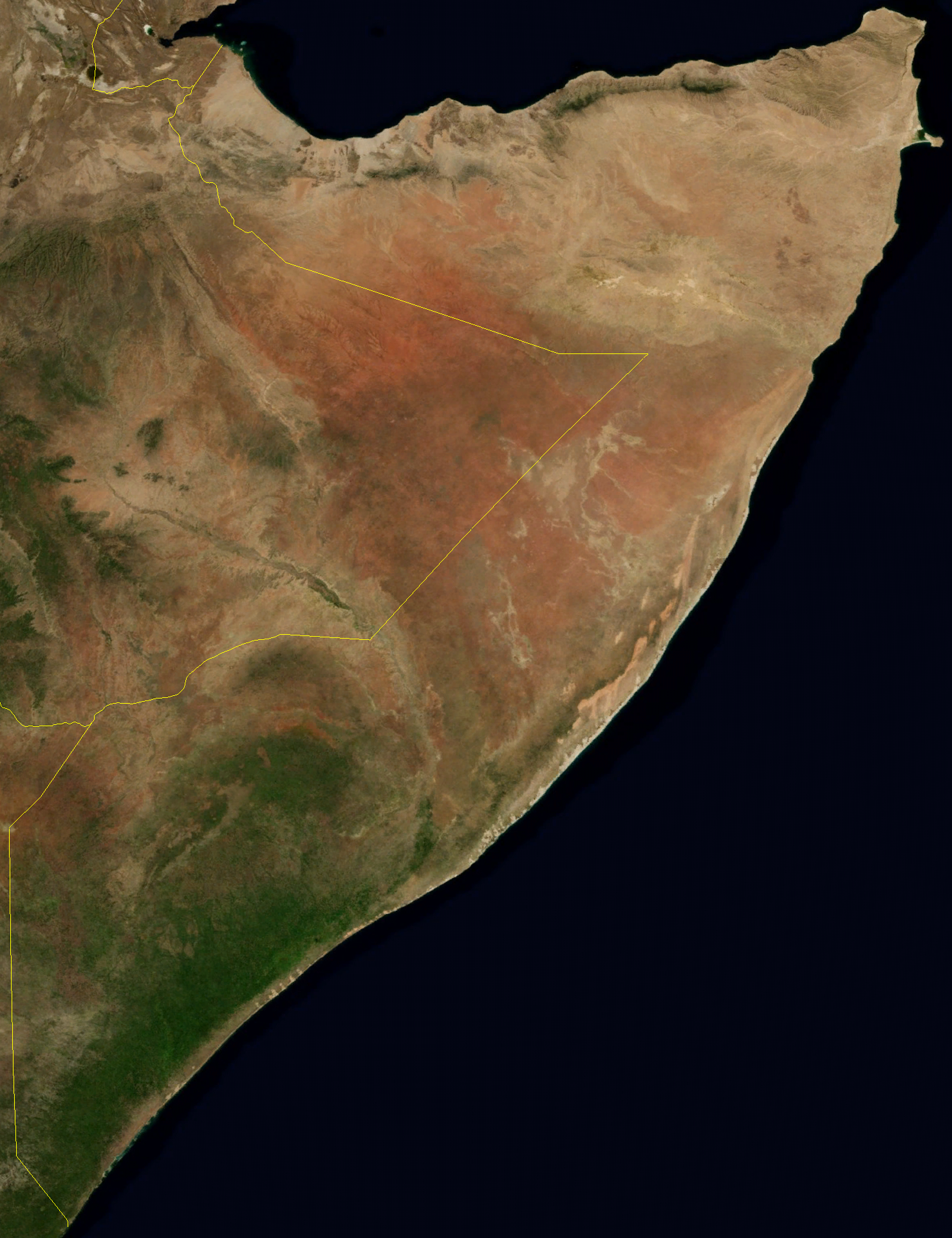
An enlargeable satellite image of Puntland within Somalia.

Geography of Puntland

- Location — Puntland is located in the northern east of Somalia between the points 52°48E / 12°10N to 48°00E / 11°10N and to the point 48°00E / 7°48N to 49°30E / 7°34N and 49°39E / 7°23N.
- Puntland has 1525 km (825 nm) of coastline from Cape Kalwein at 48°E, 13°10N in the west of Bosaso to the Cape Guardfui in the East of Bosaso at 52°48E, 14°00N between Abd Alkuri Island of Puntland and Samhah Island of Socatra, to the border sea with the South Somalia at 49°39 E, 7°23N to 50°48 E, 6°35N.
- The Puntland territorial water is (100 nm) according to the sea law on 2006, and situated within the following regions:
  - Eastern Hemisphere and Southern Hemisphere
  - Africa
    - East Africa
      - Horn of Africa
        - Somalia – see also States and regions of Somalia
  - Time zone(s): EAT
- Population of Puntland: 5,000,000
- Area of Puntland: (124,320 km^{2}), (48,000 mi^{2}),
- Atlas of Somalia

=== Environment of Puntland ===
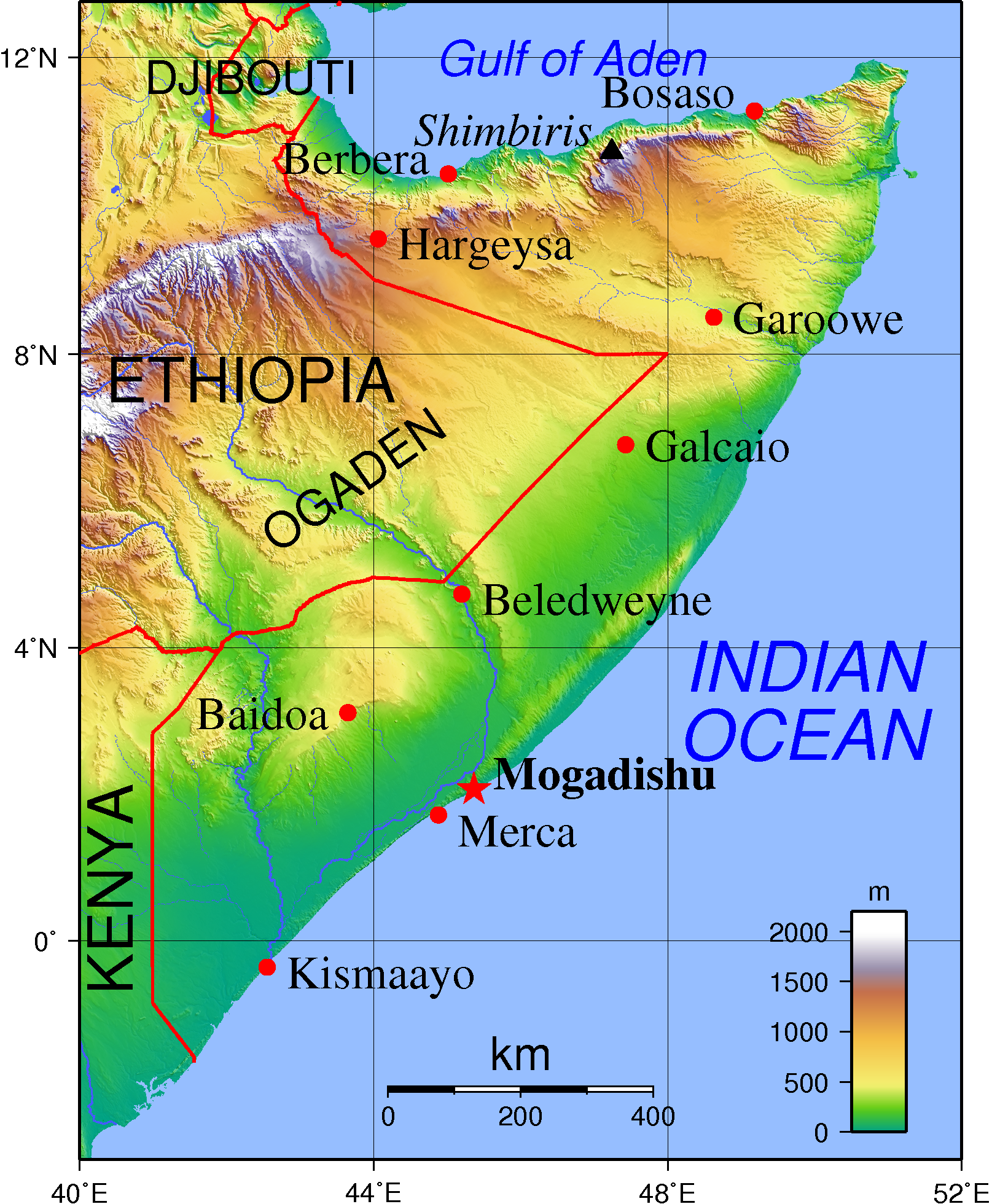
An enlargeable topographic map of Puntland within Somalia.

- Climate of Puntland

==== Natural geographic features of Puntland ====
- Glaciers of Puntland: None

=== Regions of Puntland ===
==== Administrative divisions of Puntland ====
===== Administrative regions of Puntland =====
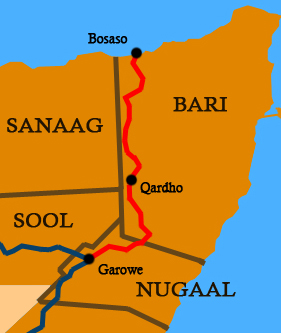
Map of Puntland

- Bari
- Karkaar
- Haylaan
- Ra'as Aseir
- Nugaal
- Mudug

===== Districts of Puntland =====
Districts, by administrative of Puntland region:

- Districts of Ra'as Aseir
  - Alula District
  - Baargaal District
  - Hafun District
- Districts of Bari
  - Bosaso District
  - Iskushuban District
  - Qandala District
  - Armo District
  - Rako District
- Districts of Karkaar
  - Qardho District
  - Bayla District
  - Waiye District
- District of Haylaan
  - Badhan District
  - Dhahar District
  - Laasqoray District
- Districts of Nugaal
  - Garoowe District
  - Burtinle District
  - Eyl District
  - Dangorayo District
  - Godobjiran District
- Districts of Mudug
  - Galkayo District
  - Jariban District
  - Gara'ad District
  - Galdogob District
  - Tawfiiq District

===== Cities in Puntland =====
- Aluula
- Badhan
- Bali busle
- Balidhidhin
- Bargal
- Bayla
- Bosaso
- Buran
- Dangorayo
- Dhahar
- Hadhwanaag
- Falaydhyale
- Eyl
- Garowe
- Jalam
- Galgala
- Galkayo
- Garacad
- Goldogob
- Hafun
- Harfo
- Hadaftimo
- Lasqoray
- xingalol
- Xidda
- Iskushuban
- Qandala
- Qardho
- Taleex
- Waiye
- Yalho
- Kilmia

== Islands ==
- Abd al Kuri
- Hafun

== Government and politics of Puntland ==
Politics of Puntland

- Form of government: national autonomous presidential republic
- Capital of Puntland: Presidential Palace, Garowe

=== Branches of the government of Puntland ===
==== Executive branch of the government of Puntland ====
- Head of state: President of Puntland
  - President of Puntland: Said Abdullahi Deni
  - Vice President of Puntland: Ilyas Osman Lugator
- Head of government: President of Puntland
  - President of Puntland: Said Abdullahi Deni
  - Vice President of Puntland: Ilyas Osman Lugator

==== Legislative branch of the government of Puntland ====
- House of Representatives of Puntland: 6th Parliament of Puntland (2023)
  - Speaker of the House of Representatives of Puntland: Abdirizak Ahmed Said
  - 1st Deputy Speaker of the House of Representatives: Mohamed Baarishire

Abdullahi Osman

  - 2nd Deputy Speaker of the House of Representatives: Mohamed Mahmoud Isse

==== Judicial branch of the government of Puntland ====
Court system of Puntland

- Supreme Court of Puntland

=== Foreign relations of Puntland ===
- Diplomatic missions of Puntland

==== International organization membership ====
- None (regional administration)

=== Law and order in Puntland ===
- Human rights in Puntland
  - LGBT rights in Puntland

=== Law enforcement in Puntland ===
- Puntland Dervish Force
- Puntland Intelligence Security Agency
- Puntland Maritime Police Force
- Puntland Police Force
- Puntland Security Force

== History of Puntland ==
- History of Puntland
  - Majeerteen Sultanate
  - Sultanate of Hobyo

== Culture of Puntland ==
- National symbols of Puntland
  - Coat of arms of Puntland
  - Flag of Puntland
- Religion in Puntland
  - Islam in Puntland
- Demonyms of Puntland
  - Puntish, Puntian, Puntite, Puntlander

== Economy and infrastructure of Puntland ==
Economy of Puntland

- Communications in Puntland
  - Media in Puntland
    - Puntland TV and Radio
    - Garowe Online
    - Puntland Post
    - Radio Garowe
- Companies of Puntland
  - Golis Telecom Somalia
  - Bosaso Tannery
- Energy in Puntland
  - Oil exploration in Puntland
- Transport in Puntland
  - Roads in Puntland
    - Garowe-Bosaso Highway
  - Seaports in Puntland
    - Port of Bosaso
  - Airports in Puntland
    - Abdullahi Yusuf Airport
    - Alula Airport
    - Bosaso International Airport
    - Candala Airport
    - Garowe International Airport
    - Iskushuban Airport
    - Qardho Airport

== Education in Puntland ==
- Puntland State University
- Admas University College–Garowe
- East Africa University
- Bosaso University
- RedSea University
- Sahal University

=== Non-governmental organization ===
- Puntland Development Research Center
- Tadamun

== See also ==
- Outline of Somalia
- Outline of geography
- Outline of Somaliland
