= Geesaley =

Geesaley Gesalay جآسالآي
- Town
- Location in Somalia.
- Coordinates: 11°44′50″N 50°30′12″E
- Country: Somalia: Puntland
- Region: Bari
- Time zone: UTC+3 (EAT)

Geesaley (Somali: Gesalay, Arabic: جآسالآي), also known as Gesulli, is a coastal town in the northeastern Bari province of Somalia. It is situated in the autonomous Puntland region. Home to the largest date farm in the Horn of Africa.

== Location ==
Geesaley is located at 11°44′49.76″N 50°30′12.47″E, facing the Gulf of Aden. It lies 4 nautical miles (4.6 miles) northeast of Murcanyo and 2.6 nautical miles (3 miles) southwest of Habo.

== Geography ==
The town is situated on a low plain towering with thousands of date palms surrounded by the Jebel Murcanyo mountain range and an elongated bay that lies in the Gulf of Aden. ' meaning mountain in Arabic), the mountain range stretches across the Bari region to the Indian Ocean coastline at Bargal. It consists of cream-coloured limestone, as well as sandstone, shale and quartz.

== Administration ==
On April 8, 2013, the Puntland government announced the creation of a new region coextensive with Geesaley and Cape Guardafui, named Gardafuul. Carved out of the Bari region, it consists of three districts and has its capital at Alula.

== Education ==
According to the Puntland Ministry of Education, there is 1 primary school in Geesaley.

== See also ==
- Maritime history of Somalia
- Geography of Somalia
