= Habo (disambiguation) =

Habo may refer to:

== Places ==
- Habo, a town in Sweden
- Habo, a town in Caluula district, Somalia
- Habo Municipality, a municipality in Jönköping County, Sweden

== Other ==
- Habbo, a social networking hotel game site
- Habonim, a Zionist youth movement
