= Yake, Somalia =

Yake
- Populated place
- Location
- Coordinates: 09°13′16″N 49°07′21″E
- Country: Somalia
- Region: Bari

Population (2007)
  - Total: 2,520
- Time zone: UTC+3 (EAT)

Yake (Yaka, Yaka Yaka, Yaka yake, Yakayake) is a populated place in the northeastern Bari region of Somalia.

Yake is the second largest settlement in the Qardho District. It belongs to the Karkaar region in the Puntland classification.

== History ==
=== Before Somalia Independence ===
Yake appears in a book published in England in 1951 under the name "Yaka".

=== After the Somali Civil War ===
Yake grew rapidly in 1996.

As of 2002, 500 families lived in the area. The water supply was from 33 Berkad, or rainwater reservoirs. During the dry season, water was transported by truck.

In March 2014, President Puntland visited Yake.

In March 2016, a drought occurred in Qardho District, including Yake, and the Al-Minhaj Foundation distributed food and other resources.

In June 2019, five people were in a coma and three were missing due to a combination of cold and rain in Yake.

In September 2021, the Puntland government constructed a well in Yake.
