= Booco =

- Archaeological site
- Location in Somalia.
- Coordinates: 11°56′00″N 50°54′00″E
- Country: Somalia: Puntland
- Region: Bari
- Time zone: UTC+3 (EAT)

Booco is an archaeological site in the northeastern Bari province of Somalia.

== Overview ==
Booco is situated in the Aluula District, near Aluula. The site has a number of ancient structures. Two of these are enclosed platform monuments set together, which are surrounded by small stone circles. The circles of stone are believed to mark associated graves.

== See also ==
- Damo
- Mosylon
- Somali aristocratic and court titles
