= Majiyohan =

- Town
- Location in Somalia.
- Coordinates: 11°4′19″N 49°0′52″E
- Country: Somalia
- Regional State: Puntland
- Region: Bari, Somalia
- District: Bosaso District
- Time zone: UTC+3 (EAT)

Majiyohan (also known as Majayahan, Mijayahan, Manja-Yihan or Majiyahan), is a town in the northeastern Bari region of Somalia. Situated in the autonomous Puntland region. It is located at the northern foothills of the eastern end of the Galgala Mountains, which extend from east to west. It is mainly inhabited by the Dubays branch of the Warsangali clan.

It is a center for mining and is noted for its mineral resources. The latter have been estimated at 200,000 t at a grade of 0.074% tin, 0.011% tantalum, 0.098% rubidium, and 0.036% cesium. There is a dispute between local residents and the Puntland government over the concession.

== History ==
=== Before the Somali Civil War ===
In 1948, the British government demolished the quarry in Majiyohan as part of its policy of occupying Italian Somaliland.

In the 1970s, the Somali government gave the mining rights in Majiyohan to a Bulgarian company. In 1979, the mine produced 134 tons of tin concentrate, but was abandoned when the Bulgarian company withdrew.

=== After the Somali Civil War ===
In 2006, an underground resources survey team, including military units sent by Puntland, was attacked by local militias in Majdijohan. This led to a battle between the Warsangali clans and the Puntland government. There were 600 Puntland troops and 80-100 Warsangali militia. The Somaliland government may or may not have supported the Warsangali militia. This battle led the Warsangali clan to distance themselves from the Puntland government and establish Maakhir State. Also related to this conflict, Caydiid Axmed Nuur defected from Puntland to Somaliland.

Majiyohan businessman Mohamed Said Atom aided the Warsangali militia and then rapidly rose to power as a military leader.

In October 2017, Puntland Security Force conducted a cleanup operation in Majiyohan and other areas in the Galgala Mountains, including Al-Shabaab.

In August 2021, the Puntland Maritime Police conducted an operation in Majiyohan to clean up armed groups belonging to al-Shabaab and ISIS countries.
