= Af Ruugleey =

Hamlet in Bari, Somalia

- Populated place
- Location in Somalia.
- Coordinates: 10°13′37.88″N 50°53′51.06″E
- Country: Somalia: Puntland
- Region: Bari
- Elevation: 57 m (187 ft)
- Time zone: UTC+3 (EAT)

Af Ruugleey (also Afreugley) is a tiny hamlet in the northeastern Bari region of Somalia. It is situated on the Indian Ocean coast in the Iskushuban District of the autonomous Puntland region.

Af Ruugleey is either abandoned or a seasonal place. While on Bing.com/maps the place seems to have 7 or 8 dwellings and a similar number of small fishing boats on the beach, on Google Maps it seems abandoned with apparently only one habitable dwelling and no boats. It is however not clear when both pictures were taken. Af Ruugley is known to function as a temporary or seasonal location for lobster fishermen from nearby Foar.
