= Qardho =

Qardho 𐒎𐒖𐒇𐒊𐒙 قرضو
- City
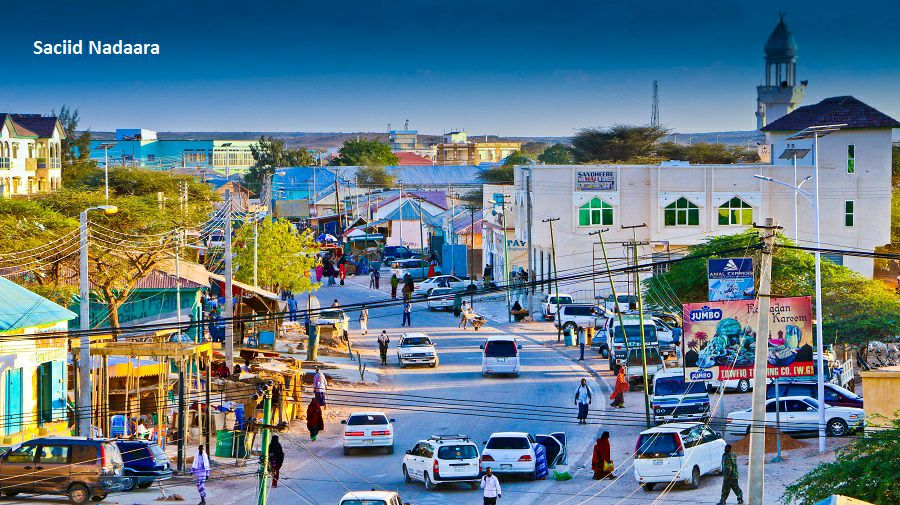
- Nickname: Magaalada Hiddaha iyo dhaqanka
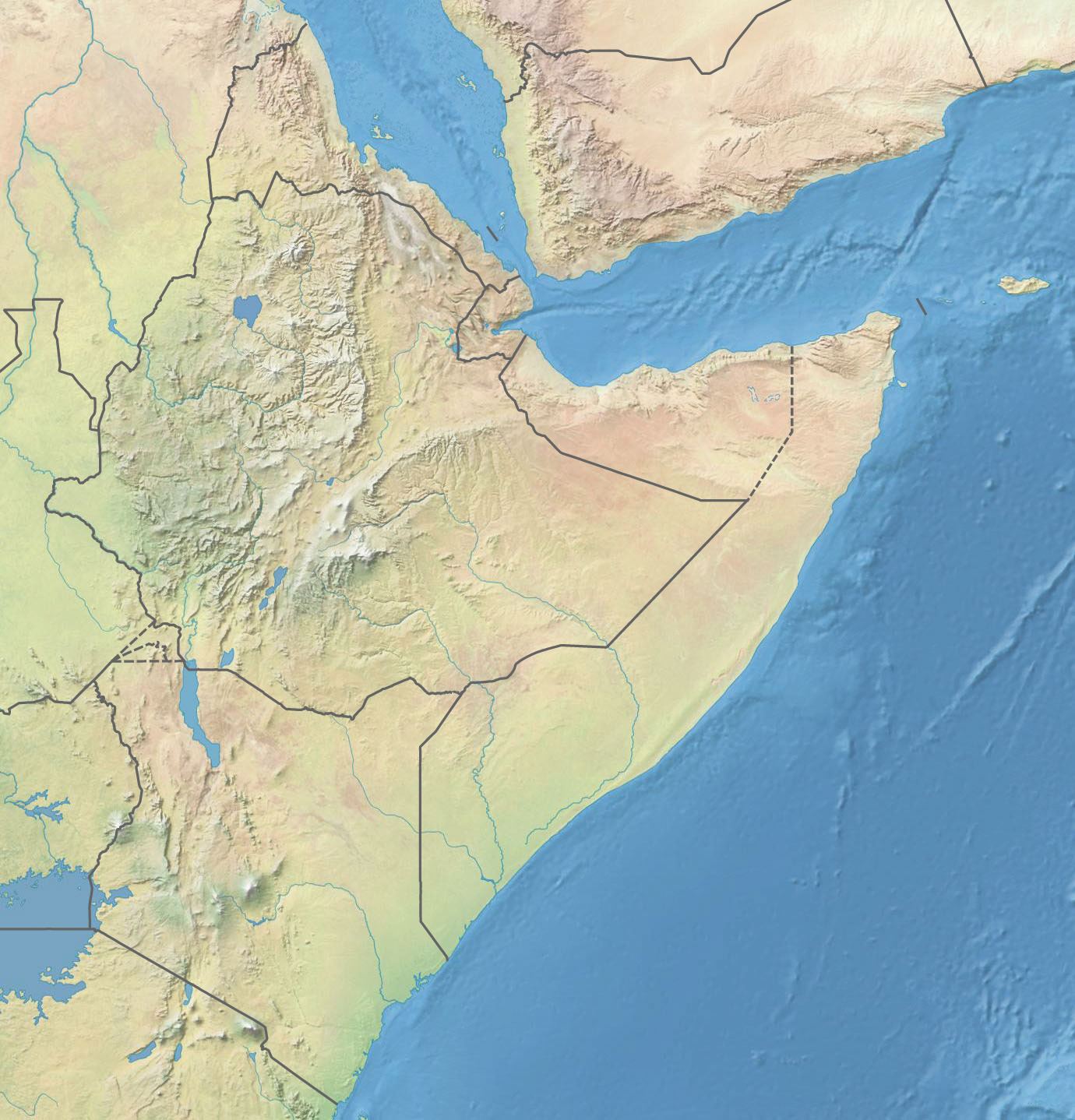
- Location within Somalia Location within the Horn of Africa Location within Africa
- Coordinates: 9°30′N 49°05′E
- Country: Somalia
- Regional State: Puntland
- Region: karkaar
- District: Qardho District

Government
  - Mayor: Abdikadir Abdi Said "Qaal"
  - Vice Mayor: Mohamed Abdullahi Said

Area
  - Total: 200 km^{2} (77 sq mi)

Population
  - Total: 185,000(2,020) 190,000(2,022)
- Time zone: UTC+3 (EAT)
- Climate: BWh

Qardho (Somali: Qardho, Arabic: قرضو), also known as Gardo, is a city in the northeastern Bari region of Somalia, a district within the autonomous state of Puntland.

== History ==
=== Until Somalia's Independence ===
Qardho is one of a series of ancient settlements in northern Somalia. In the Arie Valley, midway between the city and the town of Iskushuban, once lay a sizable town with considerable structures featuring thick walls. Qardho is also situated near the burial place of the immediate forefather of the Marehan Darod clan.

In the early modern period, Qardho was a part of the Majeerteen Sultanate (Migiurtinia), centered in Aluula. It was later incorporated into Italian Somaliland during the early 20th century.

=== Around Somalia's independence ===
In 1959, Abdirashid Shermarke, who later became Somalia's president, became a member of the Somali Legislative Assembly as a representative of Qardho.

In June 1981, the World Bank identified three areas in northeastern Somalia as promising for irrigation, one of which is between Erigavo and Qardho. The rest are near the Nugaal Valley and near Galkayo.

=== After the Somali Civil War ===
In August 1993, the United Nations Security Council had not yet given up on an early end to the Somali Civil War, and in a report dated August 17, it reported that "a total of 21 district councils had been formed, including 2 in the north-east...Bari region: Gardo Bender Beyla."

In 1998, the WFP completed two flood control reservoirs in the village of Dahan near Qardho. It also completed the first phase of a slaughterhouse and distributed food.

In August 2002, former President of Puntland, Abdullahi Yusuf Ahmed occupied Qardho, which was controlled by troops loyal to President Jama Ali Jama (who was later removed from office and never recognized as having served as president).

On December 4, 2003, the Puntland government announced the establishment of four regions: Bosaso, Karkaar, and Haylan. The Karkaar region was separated from the Bari region. Qardho was determined to be the capital of the Karkaar region.

In 2006, Cismaan Buux Cali was elected as City Council President and Mayor of Qardho for the first time since 1968.

In August 2010, local council elections resulted in the council president being Maxamed Siciid Hoggaamo; Maxamed became the first democratically elected council president.

In December 2011, five pirates were arrested by Puntland police in Qardho. At that point, there was reportedly still many pirates in the Karkaar area.

In November 2012, Puntland President Abdirahman Farole visited Qardho, where residents burned tires and threw stones in protest.

In June 2013, Cabdullaahi Muuse, the 34th Boqor (King) of the Darod clan, died in Finland due to illness. In May 2014, it was reported that Burhaan had been named king of the Majeerteen Sultanate and the 34th Boqor (King) of the Darod clan in Qardho.

In May 2015, Qardho's basketball team won the Eastern and Central African basketball tournament in Dar es Salaam, Tanzania, defeating a team from Cairo, Egypt.

In July 2015, Somalia's Federal Prime Minister Omar Sharmarke visited Qardho.

In September 2015, the Qardho City Council elected Cabdi Siciid Cismaan as mayor.

=== Somaliland Army Colonel in Exile ===
In May 2018, Colonel Siciid Cawil Caarre, commander of the 3rd Battalion of the Somaliland Army in El Afweyn District, defected to Qardho, Puntland, with an army.

In June 2018, a delegation from the United Arab Emirates visited Qardho.

In July 2018, Somalia's Prime Minister Hassan Ali Khaire visited Qardho on high alert and was welcomed.

In August 2018, Colonel Caarre announced that he had built a military base on the outskirts of Qardho to resist Somaliland. This was provided by the Puntland government, which stated that it would accept all asylum seekers from Somaliland.

In March 2019, the Puntland government banned the army led by Colonel Caarre stationed in Qardho. The local government of Qardho forbade Colonel Caarre's troops from entering the town. In July 2019, Colonel Caarre's forces were reported fighting Somaliland troops in the town of Dhoobo, far from Qardho.

=== Recent Situations ===
In April 2020, the Puntland government seized a large quantity of smuggled Khat and burned it as an example in a public square outside Qardho.

In August 2020, the Food and Agriculture Organization (FAO) built a pest monitoring and management center in Qardho.

In September 2021, Puntland President Said Abdullahi Dani appointed Maxamed Faarax Cabdiseed (Buraale) as interim mayor of Qardho.

=== Local Elections ===
Local elections for Puntland were held in Qardho in October 2021. It was the first democratic election in 50 years.

In April 2022, Abdikadir Said Qaal has been elected as the new mayor of Gardo and the chairman of the local council is an election that recently happened

2021 Puntland municipal election
- October 25, 2021
Party
Kaah
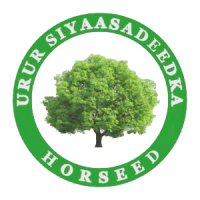
Horseed
Runta & Cadaaladda
Party
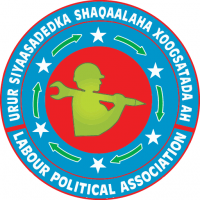
SXA
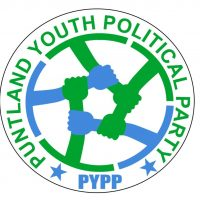
Dhalinyarada
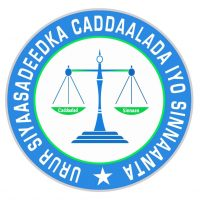
Caddaaladda & Sinnaanta
Party
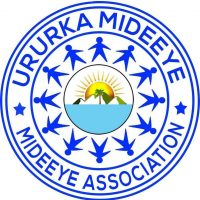
Mideeye
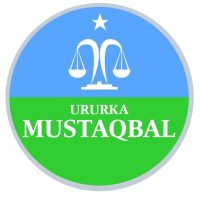
Mustaqbal
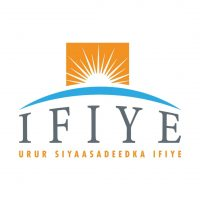
Ifiye
- Opposition (52): Mideeye (25); Cadaalada iyo Sinaanta (20); Horseed (3); Run iyo Cadaalad (2); Mustaqbal (1); Ifiye (1); Shaqaalaha Xoogsatada ah (0); Dhalinyarada (0); Conservative (35): Kaah (35)

' The Puntland Municipal elections' were held in Puntland, a state of Somalia, on October 25, 2021, with the preliminary elections in three districts namely Qardho, Eyl and Ufayn electing councils for these three districts ahead of state-wide local council elections expected to take place in early 2022. The election was the first one under the principle of one man, one vote to be held in Somalia since 1969 and the state since its formation in 1998.

Candidates in district elections run and are nominated by political parties. The mayor and District Council are then selected internally by the Councils at the first special sitting of the new legislative session.

== Demographics ==
Qardho had a population of around 47,700 inhabitants in 2000. The broader Qardho District has a total population of 300,000.

== Climate ==
Qardho has a hot arid climate (Köppen climate classification BWh).

Climate data for Qardho
Month	Jan	Feb	Mar	Apr	May	Jun	Jul	Aug	Sep	Oct	Nov	Dec	Year
Record high °C (°F)	32.8 (91.0)	39.0 (102.2)	36.5 (97.7)	36.6 (97.9)	39.5 (103.1)	38.6 (101.5)	35.0 (95.0)	35.0 (95.0)	37.8 (100.0)	36.5 (97.7)	34.3 (93.7)	32.8 (91.0)	39.5 (103.1)
Mean daily maximum °C (°F)	29.3 (84.7)	30.1 (86.2)	32.5 (90.5)	33.6 (92.5)	34.7 (94.5)	33.3 (91.9)	31.6 (88.9)	32.7 (90.9)	34.4 (93.9)	33.2 (91.8)	30.7 (87.3)	29.4 (84.9)	32.1 (89.8)
Daily mean °C (°F)	21.4 (70.5)	21.2 (70.2)	23.9 (75.0)	26.2 (79.2)	27.7 (81.9)	27.2 (81.0)	26.2 (79.2)	26.5 (79.7)	27.2 (81.0)	25.3 (77.5)	22.2 (72.0)	21.5 (70.7)	24.7 (76.5)
Mean daily minimum °C (°F)	13.4 (56.1)	13.5 (56.3)	15.3 (59.5)	18.5 (65.3)	20.6 (69.1)	21.2 (70.2)	20.6 (69.1)	20.3 (68.5)	20.0 (68.0)	17.5 (63.5)	13.6 (56.5)	13.6 (56.5)	17.3 (63.1)
Record low °C (°F)	5.6 (42.1)	6.0 (42.8)	6.0 (42.8)	10.0 (50.0)	15.0 (59.0)	17.4 (63.3)	18.0 (64.4)	17.0 (62.6)	16.0 (60.8)	10.0 (50.0)	7.2 (45.0)	6.5 (43.7)	5.6 (42.1)
Average rainfall mm (inches)	1 (0.0)	0 (0)	3 (0.1)	19 (0.7)	35 (1.4)	3 (0.1)	1 (0.0)	8 (0.3)	5 (0.2)	16 (0.6)	2 (0.1)	3 (0.1)	96 (3.6)
Average rainy days (≥ 0.1 mm)	0	0	0	1	2	0	0	1	1	2	0	0	7
Average relative humidity (%)	59	59	55	58	59	58	63	62	59	60	63	63	60
Percentage possible sunshine	82	84	81	75	69	80	74	79	80	78	82	82	79
Source 1: Deutscher Wetterdienst
Source 2: Food and Agriculture Organization: Somalia Water and Land Management (percent sunshine)

== Education ==
Qardho has a number of academic institutions. According to the Puntland Ministry of Education, there are 39 primary schools in the Qardho District. Among these are Al-Xanaan, Shire, Gahayr and Gudcad. Secondary schools in the area include Sheikh Osman, Muntada, Nawawi and Al-Ashar. Al-Azhar University, Egypt's highest authority for Islamic affairs, also operates a school in Qardho.

At the post-secondary level, the East Somalia University (ESU) offers higher instruction. East Africa University (EAU) also has one of its seven branches in the city.

== Services ==
On November 25, 2012, the Puntland government opened a new maximum security prison facility in Qardho. Inaugurated by former Puntland President Abdirahman Mohamud Farole and a delegation of cabinet ministers, senior government representatives and district officials, the institution provides both custodial housing and social rehabilitation programs. The UNDP is also slated to assist in capacity building for the prison's correctional administration and staff.

Additionally, the city is served by the Gardo General Hospital. A private healthcare facility, it has a Microbiology Service Laboratory.

In April 2013, the Puntland Ministry of Fisheries and Marine Resources announced plans to open a new fish market within the year in Qardho. The project is part of a larger regional development plan that will also see a similar marketplace inaugurated in Galkayo, in the model of the already launched Garowe fish market.

In June 2014, the Puntland government launched a new tree-planting campaign in the state, with the regional Ministry of Environment, Wildlife and Tourism slated to plant 25,000 trees by the end of the year. Qardho is among the seven cities and towns earmarked for the reforestation initiative, which also include Garowe, Bosaso, Dhahar, Buuhoodle, Baran and Galkayo. The campaign is part of a broader partnership between the Puntland authorities and EU to set up various environmental protection measures in the region, with the aim of promoting reforestation and afforestation.

In May 2015, the Puntland regional government announced that it was slated to launch new development projects in Qardho.

== Transportation ==
Air transportation in Qardho is served by the Qardho Airport. In late September 2013, Puntland Deputy Minister of Civil Aviation Abdiqani Gelle announced that the authorities in Somalia's autonomous Puntland region would carry out major renovations at the airport, as well as at the Garowe International Airport in Garowe and the Abdullahi Yusuf International Airport in Galkayo. A tender process for a similar upgrade initiative was concurrently launched at the Bender Qassim International Airport in Bosaso.

In October 2012, the Puntland Highway Authority (PHA) also began a major upgrade and repair project on the main road linking Qardho with Bosaso.

== Notes ==
http://www.tageo.com/index-e-so-cities-SO.htm
