= Murcanyo =

Murcanyo Murcanyo 𐒑𐒚𐒇𐒋𐒖𐒒𐒕𐒙 Murayo مورايو Murayo
- Town
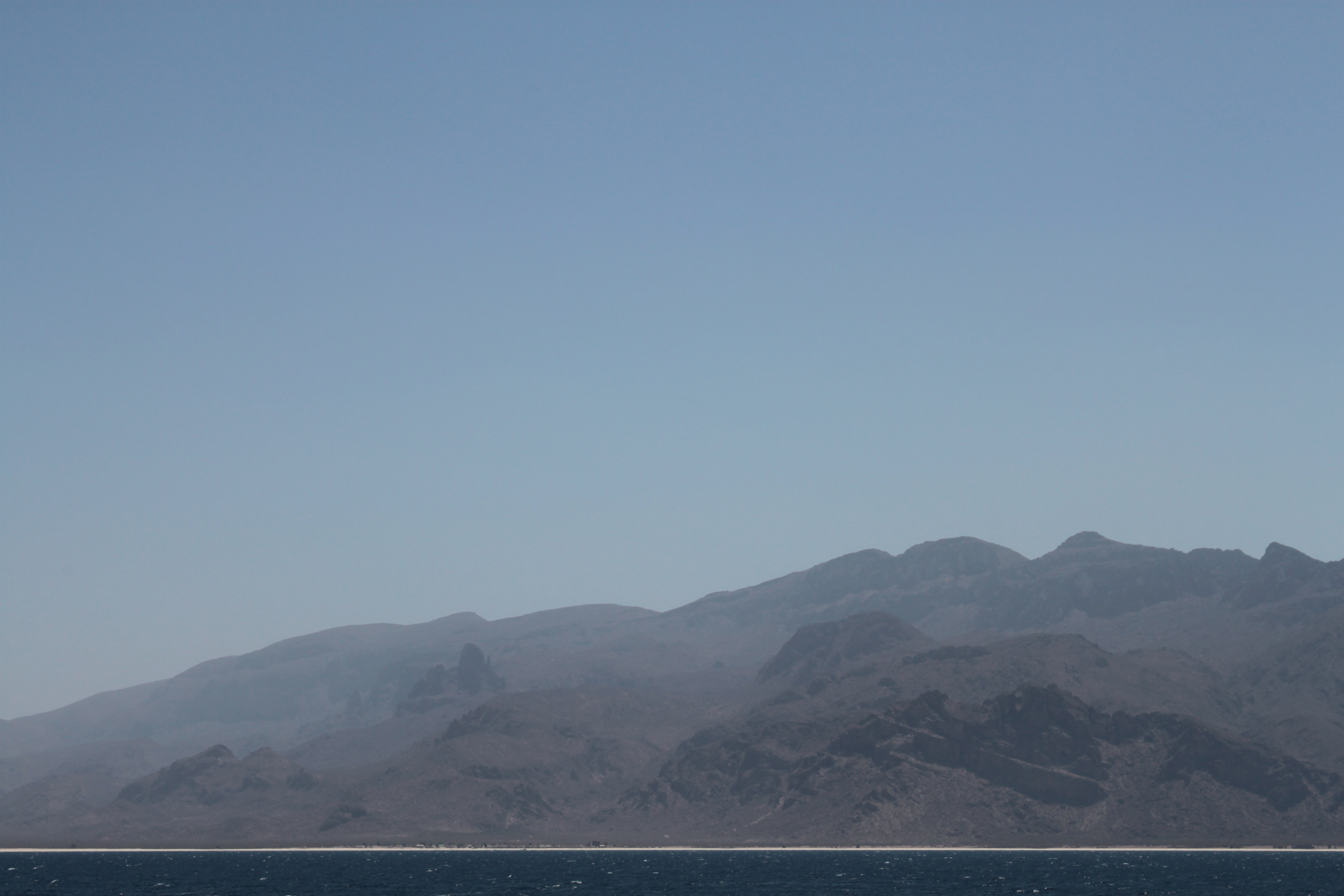
- View of Murcanyo town at the foot of the Jebel (جبل) Murcanyo mountains
- Nickname: Bander Murcanyo
- Location in Somalia.
- Coordinates: 11°41′00″N 50°27′00″E
- Country: Somalia
- Regional State: Puntland
- Region: Bari
- District: Murcanyo
- Established: 1700

Government
  - Type: Puntland, Somalia

Population
  - Total: 16,320
- Time zone: UTC+3 (EAT)

Murcanyo (Somali: Muranyo, Arabic: مورايو), also known as Bander Murcaayo (alternatively Bandar Murcaayo or Bunder Marayah), is a coastal town in the northeastern Bari province of Somalia. It is situated in the autonomous Puntland region

== Location ==
Murcanyo is located at 11°41′34.98″N 50°27′25.34″E, in the Gulf of Aden. It lies 7 nautical miles (8 miles) southwest of Habo, 18 nautical miles (21 miles) southwest of Ras Filuk, and 38 nautical miles (44 miles) east of Qandala.

== Geography ==
The town is situated along the beach of a long bay that borders the Gulf of Aden.

Murcanyo lies at the foot of the Jebel Murcanyo mountains (Jebel meaning mountain in Arabic), also known as Jebel Marayah. This mountain range stretches across the Bari region to the Indian Ocean coastline at Bargal. The range consists of cream-coloured limestone, as well as sandstone, shale and quartz.

== History ==
The Majeerteen Sultanate was established possible around 1600s by Somalis from the Majeerteen Darod clan.l It reached prominence during the 19th century, under the reign of the resourceful of Boqor(King) Osman Mahamuud.

In the mid-17th to early 20th centuries, the city was among the areas ruled by the Majeerteen Sultanate Migiurtinia. Later forming a part of Italian Somaliland.

Murcanyo was historically an important port town along the northeastern Somalia littoral. It served as a stronghold of Bedouins from the Majeerteen clan. Through trading dhows, the town was connected to a merchant network that included regional ports like Mukalla, Jeddah and Mumbai. Local inhabitants produced and exported frankincense, indigo and mats, and imported items such as dates, a special cloth, rice and metals.

The Majeerteen Sultanate's main capital was at Alula, with its seasonal headquarters at Bargal. It likewise had a number of castles and forts in various areas within its realm, including a fortress at Murcanyo.

Murcanyo was historically an important port town along the northeastern Somalia littoral. It served as a stronghold of Bedouins from the Majeerteen clan. Through trading dhows, the town was connected to a merchant network that included regional ports like Mukalla, Jeddah and Mumbai. Local inhabitants produced and exported frankincense, indigo and mats, and imported items such as dates, a special cloth, rice and metals.

The majority of this city is Majeerteen In 1872, Murcanyo's resident population was estimated at 600-700 inhabitants. It also had three mosques.

== Administration ==
Ra’as Aseir, formerly known as Gardafuul, is a region in Puntland, Somalia . It was created in 2013, carved out of the Bari Province, and is named after Marinka Gardafu (Guardafui Channel).

On July 20, 2023, the Puntland parliament announced the renaming of the Gardafuul region to Ra’as Aseir, its original pre colonial name.

== Education ==
According to the Puntland Ministry of Education, there are 3 schools which consists of primary and secondary level.

== See also ==
- Maritime history of Somalia
- Geography of Somalia
