= Candala =

Candala may refer to:

- Chandala, a Hindu group
- Qandala, a town in northern Somalia
