= Dhudhub District =

Dhudhub District Degmada Dhudhub
- District
- Country: Somalia: Puntland
- Region: Bari
- Capital: Dhudhub
- Time zone: UTC+3 (EAT)

Dhudhub District is a district in the northeastern Bari region of Somalia. Its capital lies at Dhudhub.
