= Bereeda =

Town in Bari, Somalia

Bereeda Bareeda Bereda بارآدا
- Town
- Location in Somalia.
- Coordinates: 11°52′14.52″N 51°3′29″E
- Country: Somalia
- Regional State: Puntland
- Region: RASI ASAYR
- District: Alula
- Time zone: UTC+3 (EAT)

Bereeda (Somali: Bareeda, Arabic: بارآدا, Italian: Bereda) is a coastal town in the northeastern Bari region of Puntland state of Somalia. It is situated in the Alula District, which is in the autonomous Puntland state.

== Location ==
Bereeda is located at 11°52′14.52″N 51°3′29.17″E, facing the Gulf of Aden and Guardafui Channel. It lies 12 nautical miles (14 miles) west of Cape Guardafui and 20 nautical miles (23 miles) east of Alula.

== Administration ==
On April 8, 2013, the SOMALIA government announced the creation of a new region coextensive with Bereeda and Cape Guardafui, named Gardafuul. Carved out of the Bari region, it consists of three districts and has its capital at Alula.

== Education ==
According to the Puntland Ministry of Education, there is 1 primary school in Bereeda.

== See also ==
- Maritime history of Somalia
- Geography of Somalia
