= Tohen =

Tohen Tooxin طوهآن
- Settlement
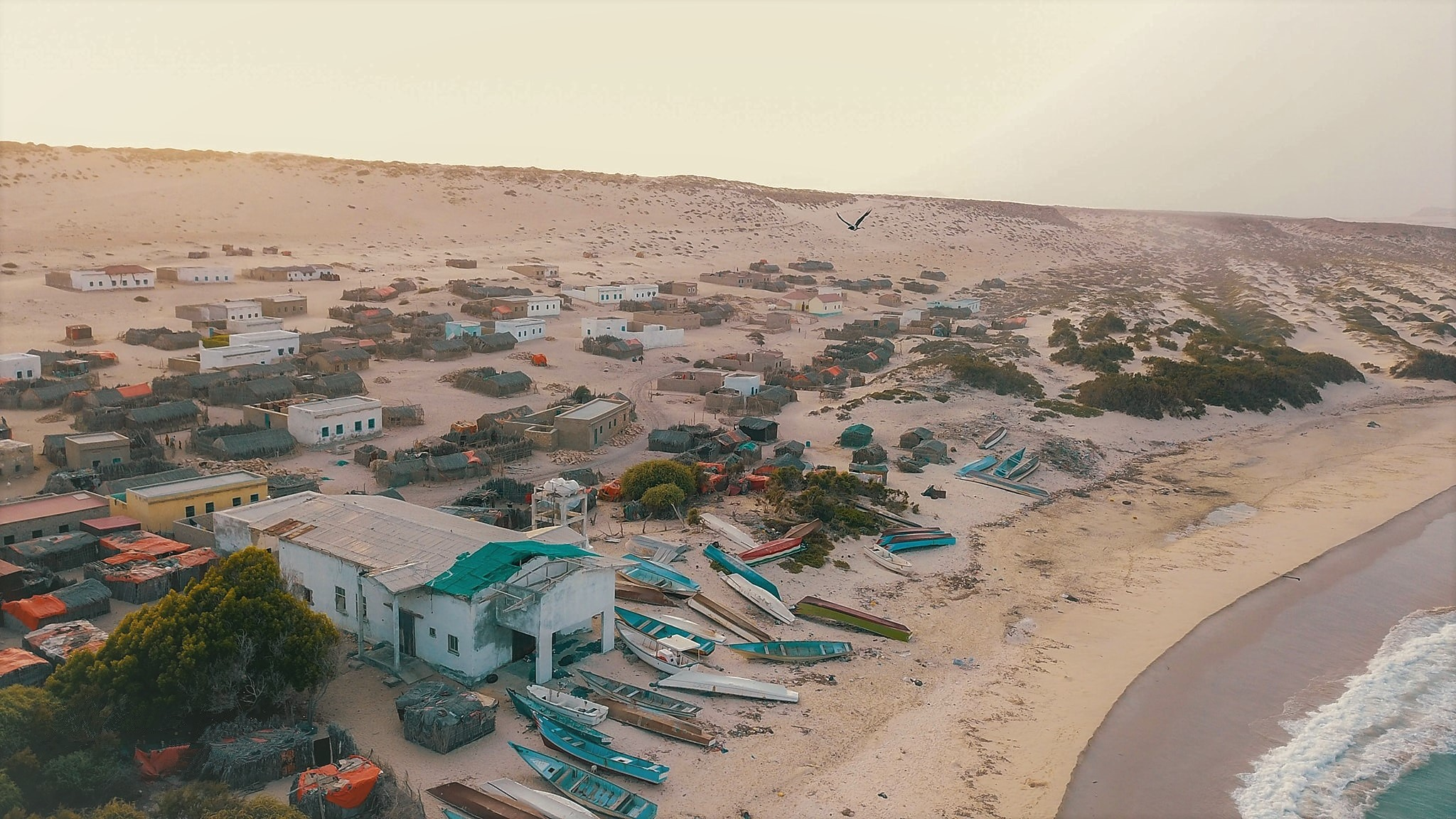
- Tooxin

- Location in Somalia.
- Coordinates: 11°45′03″N 51°15′18″E
- Country: Somalia: Puntland
- Region: Bari
- Time zone: UTC+3 (EAT)

Tohen (Somali: Tooxin, Arabic: تاؤحن) is a settlement in the northeastern Bari province of Somalia. It is situated in the autonomous Puntland region.

== Location ==
Tohen is located at 11°45′2.87″N 51°15′18.11″E, on the northeastern coast of Somalia. It faces the Guardafui Channel, and lies 5 nautical miles (6 miles) south of Cape Guardafui and the Gulf of Aden. The town of Bargal is located 30 nautical miles (35 miles) to the south.

== Administration ==
On April 8, 2013, the Puntland government announced the creation of a new region coextensive with Tohen and Cape Guardafui, named Gardafuul. Carved out of the Bari region, it consists of three districts and has its capital at Alula.

== In popular culture ==
Tohen and the neighboring lighthouse "Francesco Crispi" are depicted in Andrei Gusev's novel Once in Malindi (in Chapter 22).

== See also ==
- Maritime history of Somalia
- Geography of Somalia
