= Burhan Muse =

Daarood king

- 16th Majeerteen king (34th Majeerteen King)
- Reign: 2014–present
- Predecessor: Boqor Kingkong
- Born: 1966; Qardho, Karkaar
Names
- Boqor Burhaan Boqor Muuse Boqor Yuusuf Boqor Cismaan
- Dynasty: House of Majeerteen
- Religion: Islam

Burhan Muse Yusuf Osman (Note: Boqor means King, King Burhan King Muse King Yusuf King Osman) (Somali: Boqor Burhaan Boqor Muuse Boqor Yuusuf Boqor Cismaan; b. 1966, Arabic: برهان موسي يوسف عثمان) is the titular title of Boqor Burhan, lit. 'King Burhan' the heir apparent of the Majeerteen Sultanate. In May 2014, he was inaugurated as the 34th Majeerteen Daarood King (The supreme traditional leader of Darod tribe "ceremonial"). His inauguration was attended by officials from Puntland, Federal Government of Somalia, Jubaland, Kenya, Yemen, Somaliland and the Somali Region. In 2016, the delegations from Somali clans in Somalia, Djibouti, Ethiopia and Kenya are attending the three-day summit organized by King Burhan Musa, the 34th king of Majeerteen kingdom. It is the first such gathering for the Somali traditional leaders since the start of the Somali civil war in 1991.

== Early life ==
Burhan Muse Yusuf Osman was born in Qardho, a historic city and administrative capital of Karkaar region in Puntland, Somalia in 1966. He finished his schooling in his hometown and finished high school in 1986. Following his college studies, he moved into the business sector, establishing his own career in international trade with a focus on exporting and importing. Before becoming king, he learned a lot about business and international relations from his early job.

== Darod king ==
As the 34th monarch of the Darod Kingdom, he represents one of the most prominent and historically influential clans in the Horn of Africa. His coronation in May 2014 was a momentous occasion and the grand inauguration ceremony was attended by over a thousand guests from diverse communities.
