= Dalweyn =

Dalweyn دلوين
- Town
- Dalweyn
- Nickname: Dhulkii Nabbada
- Location in Somalia Location in the Horn of Africa Location in Africa
- Coordinates: 10°16′N 49°04′E
- Country: Somalia: Puntland
- Region: Bari
- Time zone: UTC+3 (East Africa Time)

Dalweyn is a town in the Bari province of the autonomous Puntland region in northeastern Somalia.

== History ==
The town was first established by Bile Nuur (allehaw naxariisto), a well-known leader hailing from the Reer Zakariye sub-clan of the Dashiishe Darod.

== Geography ==
Dalweyn is situated about 140 kilometres south of Bosaso, near the district of Waiye. It is strategically located and is rich in natural resources.

== Demographics ==
The town has a population of about 800 inhabitants.
