= Kob Dhexaad =

Town in Bari, Somalia

- Town
- Location in Somalia.
- Coordinates: 10°39′23″N 49°29′55″E
- Country: Somalia: Puntland
- Region: Bari

Population
  - Total: 6,000
- Time zone: UTC+3 (EAT)

Kob Dhexaad is a town in the northeastern Bari province of Somalia, situated in the Bosaso District of the autonomous Puntland region.
