= Ali Fahiye Geedi Primary and Intermediary School =

Primary school in Qandala, Puntland, Somalia

Coordinates: 11°28′N 49°52′E

Ali Fahiye Geedi Primary and intermediary School
- Qandala, Somalia; Puntland

Information
- Type: Primary School
- Established: 1920
- Staff: 10
- Gender: coeducational
- Age: 6 to 11
- Website: http://noor-foundation.org

The Ali Fahiye Geedi Primary and Intermediary School is an educational institution in Qandala, situated in the northeastern Puntland region of Somalia. It is located around 75 kilometres (47 mi) east of Bosaso, the state's commercial capital. The institution serves about 200 students.

== Overview ==
Ali Fahiye Geedi Primary and Intermediary School was established in the early 20th century, during the colonial period in Italian Somaliland. The Supreme Revolutionary Council (SRC) later launched a large renovation project of the facility. In 2009, the school again underwent major reconstruction and refurbishment.

== Funding ==
Funding for the operation and rehabilitation of the institution is provided by the Noor Foundation Somalia.

== Alumni ==
Past alumni of the school include many prominent members of the Qandala community, who have held positions both in government and major private institutions.
