= Uur Caleed =

Uur Caleed اورعليد Ur Aled
- Location in Somalia.
- Coordinates: 10°34′16.3″N 49°42′32.8″E
- Country: Somalia
- Regional State: Puntland
- Region: Bari
- Sub Region: Uur Caleed
- Elevation: 433 m (1,421 ft)

Population
  - Total: uninhabited
- Time zone: UTC+3 (EAT)

Uur Caleed is a small uninhabited area of desert in the Dharoor Valley in the Bari Region in northern Somalia, a few kilometers south of the village of Ufeyn.
