= Armo (disambiguation) =

Armo may refer to:

- Armo, a municipality in the Province of Imperia in the Italian region Liguria
- Armo District, a district in the northeastern Bari province of Somalia
- ARMO BioSciences, an American pharmaceutical company
- ARMO oil refiner, an oil refiners in Albania
- Armo, a slang term for an Armenian
