= Tisjiic =

Tisjiic تيسجي
- Village
- Location in Somalia
- Country: Somalia: Puntland
- Region: Bari, Somalia
- District: Bosaso District
- Established: 1920

Government
  - Type: Village

Population
  - Total: 10,000
- Time zone: UTC+3 (EAT)

Tisjiic is a town in the Bari region of northeastern Somalia, located 90 kilometres (56 mi) southeast of Bosaso, 30 kilometres (19 mi) off the main road connecting Bosaso and Galkayo (locally known as Laamiga) And Ufayn 63Km. The town consists of two parts, Upper Tisjiic and Lower Tisjiic, approximately three kilometers away from each other.

== Education ==
Tisjiic had two primary and intermediate schools and schools which teach the Koran.

In 2019, students in the area sat centralized exams conducted by the Puntland Ministry of Education.

== History ==
Tisjiic was first settled in 1920. The town was primarily a stream spot where pastoralists in the area took water. Tisjiic is a growing town with a significant population living in the town and surrounding places.
