= Alula Airport =

Airport in Bari, Somalia

Alula Airport Gegada Diyaaradah Caluula
- IATA: ALU; ICAO: HCMA

Summary
- Airport type: Public
- Owner: Puntland Ministry for Civil Aviation and Airports
- Serves: Alula, Somalia
- Elevation AMSL: 6 ft / 2 m
- Coordinates: 11°57′30″N 50°44′55″E

Map
- Location of the airport in Somalia

Runways
Direction	Length		Surface
Direction	m	ft	Surface
07/25	1,080	3,543	Sand
- Source: GCM Google Maps

Alula Airport (IATA: ALU, ICAO: HCMA) is an airport serving Aluula (Alula, Caluula), a Gulf of Aden coastal town in the Bari region of northeastern Somalia. The runway is 0.5 kilometres (0.3 mi) inland, paralleling the shore.

== See also ==
- Transport in Somalia
- List of airports in Somalia
