= Qardho Airport =

Airport in Somalia

Qardho Airport Gegada Diyaaradaha Qardho
- IATA: GSR; ICAO: HCMG

Summary
- Airport type: Public
- Owner: Puntland Ministry for Civil Aviation and Airports
- Serves: Qardho, Somalia
- Elevation AMSL: 2,632 ft / 802 m
- Coordinates: 9°32′35″N 49°07′04″E

Map
- Location of the airport in Somalia

Runways
Direction	Length		Surface
Direction	m	ft	Surface
1	1,600	5,249

Qardho Airport (IATA: GSR, ICAO: HCMG), also known as Gardo Airport, is an airport in Qardho town in the northeastern Bari region of Somalia.

== Overview ==
The airport sits at an elevation of 2,632 feet (802 m) above mean sea level. Its only runway is 1,600 metres (5,249 ft) long.

In late September 2013, Puntland Deputy Minister of Civil Aviation Abdiqani Gelle announced that the authorities in Somalia's autonomous Puntland region would carry out major renovations at the Qardho Airport, as well as at the Garowe International Airport in Garowe and the Abdullahi Yusuf International Airport in Galkayo. The tender process for a similar upgrade initiative was simultaneously launched at the Bender Qassim International Airport in Bosaso.

== See also ==
- List of airports in Somalia

== Notes ==
- "Gardo Airport (GSR)". World-Airport-Codes.
