= Ras Binnah =

- Cape
- Location in Somalia.
- Coordinates: 11°8′31.28″N 51°10′17.28″E
- Country: Somalia: Puntland
- Region: Bari
- Time zone: UTC+3 (EAT)

Ras Binnah is a small cape in the northeastern Bari administrative region of Somalia. It is located 20 kilometres southeast of Bargal on the coast of the Guardafui Channel.
