= Rako Raaxo =

Rako
- Rako Raaxo
- Location in Somalia.
- Coordinates: 9°47′00″N 49°44′00″E
- Country: Somalia: Puntland
- Region: Bari
- District: Rako Raaxo District

Area
  - Total: 150 km^{2} (58 sq mi)
- Time zone: UTC+3 (EAT)
- Postal code: 252

Rako Raho (Somali: Rako Raaxo, Rako Raxo) is a town in the northeastern Bari region of Somalia. It is the center of the Rako District in the autonomous Puntland region. Rako Raaxo has a number of academic institutions. According to the Puntland Ministry of Education, there are 7 primary schools and 1 Secondary School in the Rako District. Among these are Qalwo, Qarar-soor, Uur-Jire, Duud-Hooyo, Adingari and Xumbays
