= Laas Dawaco =

- Town
- Location in Somalia
- Coordinates: 10°28′N 49°05′E
- Regional State: Puntland
- Region: Bari
- Time zone: UTC+3 (EAT)
- Climate: BWh

Laaso Dawaco, also written Laz Daua, is a town in Bari, Somalia, situated 115 kilometres (71 mi) south of Bosaso, the capital city of Bari province. It’s laid on the Garowe-Bosaso Highway The town inhabited by Dishiishe clan.

== Background ==
Laasa Dawoco is among the oldest towns in Bari region, it was settled in 1820. The settlement was familiar with shallow wells that endured all seasons of the year.
