= Rako District =

Coordinates: 9.7794°N 49.7296°E

- District
- Interactive map of Rako District
- Country: Somalia: Puntland
- Region: Bari
- Capital: Waiye
- Time zone: UTC+3 (EAT)

Rako District is a district in the northeastern Bari region of Somalia. Its capital lies at Rako Raaxo.
