= Candala Airport =

Candala Airport Gegada Diyaarada Qandala
- IATA: CXN; ICAO: HCMC

Summary
- Airport type: Airstrip
- Serves: Candala (Qandala)
- Location: Bari, Puntland, Somalia
- Elevation AMSL: 9 ft / 3 m
- Coordinates: 11°29′40″N 049°54′31″E

Map
- Location of airport in Somalia

Runways
| Direction | Length | | Surface |
| Direction | m | ft | Surface |
|---|---|---|---|
| 22/04 | 1,091 | 3,579 | Soil |

Candala Airport (IATA: CXN, ICAO: HCMC) is an airstrip serving Candala (also spelled Qandala), a town in the northeastern Bari region in Puntland, Somalia.

== Facilities ==
The airstrip is open to the public. Its airfield has an elevation of 9 feet (2.743 m) above mean sea level. It has 1 natural surface runway measuring 3,579 ft (1,091 m).
