= Juurile =

Town in Bari, Somalia

- Town
- Country: Somalia: Puntland
- Region: Bari
- Time zone: UTC+3 (EAT)

Juurile is a town in the Bari region of Puntland in northeastern Somalia, situated on the Garowe-Bosaso Highway, 125 kilometres (78 mi) south of Bosaso.

== Education ==
Juurile has a number of schools, according to Puntland ministry of education, there are two primary and intermediate schools in Juurile.

== Location ==
Juurile is located at 10.38350° N, 49.07134° E

== See also ==
- Juurile, Bari, Somalia
