= Iskushuban Airport =

Airport in Somalia

Iskushuban Airport Scusciuban
- IATA: CMS; ICAO: HCMS

Summary
- Airport type: Public
- Serves: Iskushuban
- Elevation AMSL: 1,121 ft / 342 m
- Coordinates: 10°18′50″N 50°12′20″E

Map
- Location of the airport in Somalia

Runways
Direction	Length		Surface
Direction	m	ft	Surface
09/27	2,300	7,540	Unpaved
14/32	1,580	5,180	Unpaved
- Source: Google Maps

Iskushuban Airport (IATA: CMS, ICAO: HCMS) (Somali: Gegada Diyaaradaha Iskushuban) is an airport serving Iskushuban, Somalia. The runways are unpaved but marked, and are exceptionally wide at over 550 feet (168 m).

== See also ==
- Transport in Somalia
