= Ras Aseir =

Region in Puntland

Ra'as Aseir Gobolka Raas Caseyr
- Region
- Ra'as Aseir
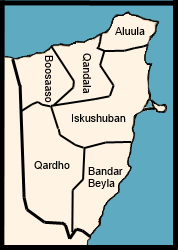
- Ra'as Aseir comprises the districts of Qandala, iskushuban, and Aluula.
- Country: Somalia Puntland
- Capital: Aluula
- Time zone: UTC+3 (EAT)
- Area code: +25290

Ra'as Aseir (Somali: Raas Caseyr) formerly known as Gardafu is a region in north-east of Puntland, Somalia. It is an administrative province of Puntland created in 2013 that was carved out of the Bari Province. It is named after Marinka Gardafu (Guardafui Channel). Most locals work as fisherman along the coast, and it home to the largest date farm in Somalia In the city of geesaley. The province capital is Aluula a coastal town with an extensive mangrove forest. Aluula is also the northernmost point in Somalia.

The districts of Aluula and qandala export many goods through the Port of Bosaso, Frankensense, Myrrh, Iivestock, Salt, Dates, and figs. The trade of these commodities is the main source of economic activity in the region. Over the years there have been increased levels of human trafficking to Yemen through Somalia by Ethiopian migrants particularly in the Qandala and Bosaso districts but increased activity by the Puntland Maritime Police Force has hindered human trafficking in the region.

== Overview ==
On July 20, 2013, the Puntland Parliament approved Gardafuul to become the ninth province of Puntland. At the same time, representatives of Gardafuul were appointed as the Third Deputy Secretary of Security and the Deputy Secretary of Justice of Puntland. Its capital is Alula and its governor is Musse Salah.

On July 20, 2023 The Parliament of Puntland has conducted a vote resulting in the decision to change the name of a province. Consequently, the former province known as Gardafu has been officially renamed as Ra'as Aseir.

== See also ==
- Regions of Somalia
