= Ufeyn =

District in Bari region of Somalia

Ufeyn Ufayn أفين
- District
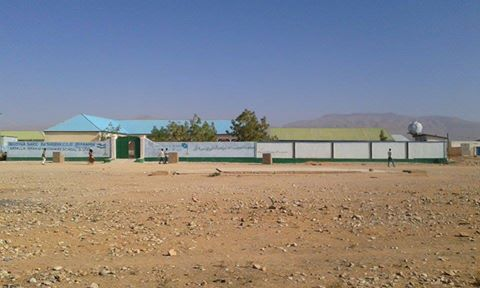

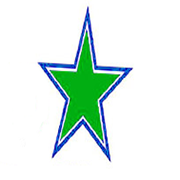
- Flag

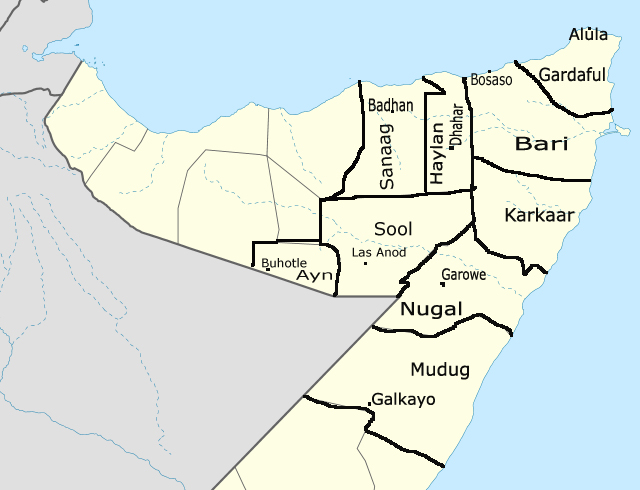

- Location in Africa
- Coordinates: 10°39′00″N 49°45′00″E
- Country: Somalia
- Regional State: Puntland
- Region: uurcaleed
- District: Ufayn District
- Founded: 1958

Government
  - Mayor: Ahmed Abshir Said

Area
  - Total: 38 km^{2} (15 sq mi)
  - Land: 177 km^{2} (68 sq mi)

Population (30,850)
  - Total: 22,850
  - Density: 39/km^{2} (100/sq mi)
- Time zone: UTC+3 (EAT)
- Area code: +252

Bosaso (Somailian: Ufayn) is the second largest district in the north-eastern Bari region of Somalia.

== Location ==
The settlement is situated near the border with the Sanaag region in SSC and just off the road, between Bosaso and Iskushuban in the desert foothills on the south side of the Ahl Mescat Mountains.

== Education ==
Ufeyn has a number of academic institutions. According to the Puntland Ministry of Education, there are 10 primary schools in the Ufeyn District. Among these are Darul Cilmi, Kobdhexad, Geesa Qabad and Jedaal. Secondary schools in the area include the Abdullahi Ibrahim Secondary.

== Municipal election ==
In October 2021, Puntland held democratic municipal election in three districts, one of which was Ufeyn. The current local government leadership was elected through that democratized process.
