= Galgala =

Galgala Maakhir
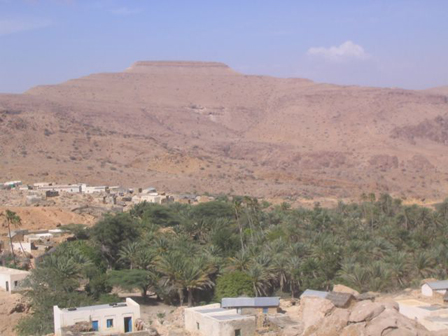

- Location in Somalia
- Coordinates: 10°59′25″N 49°3′25″E
- Country: Somalia
- Region: Bari, Somalia
- District: Bosaso District
- Time zone: UTC+3 (East Africa Time)

Galgala is a town in Bari region of Somalia. The town has ancient markings of religious symbols and crosses and ancient remains of a cairns which commonly found in Sanaag and Bari, Somalia regions.

== Galgala Campaign ==
The Galgala campaign started on 24 July 2010 when militants led by notorious arms dealer and Al Shabaab operative, Mohamed Said Atom attacked a checkpoint in the town of Karin, just south of commercial town of Bosaaso. Puntland Security Forces responded by attacking the main base of Atom's militants in Galgala on 13 August 2010. The campaign culminated by 31 October 2010.
