= Bayla District =

Bander Beyla Beyla
- District
- Bander Beila
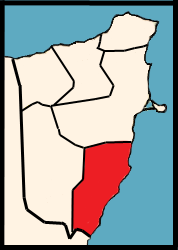
- Coordinates: 9°29′N 50°48′E
- Country: Somalia: Puntland
- Region: Bari
- Capital: Bander Beila
- Time zone: UTC+3 (EAT)

Bander Beila (chief town Bayla), also known as Bander Beyla (Italian: Bander Beila ) is a district in the northeastern Bari region of Puntland It is an old town near the Indian Ocean and is mountainous with old buildings. The Beyla region is a hybrid of fishing (with Yemen) and a small number have farms. It is a peaceful region with little police
