= Xidda =

Xidda هدى
- Town
- Location within Somalia
- Coordinates: 9°57′26″N 49°03′13″E
- Country: Somalia
- Region: Puntland
- Region: Bari
- Established: 1922
- Time zone: UTC+3 (EAT)

Xidda (Somali: Xidda) is a town in the Bari region of Puntland in northeastern Somalia. Xidda lies on the main road between the cities of Bosaso and Galkacyo.
