= Yalho =

Yalho Yahlo
- Town
- Location in Somalia
- Coordinates: 10°55′00″N 49°15′10.4″E
- Region: Bari
- District: Bosaso District
- Time zone: UTC+3 (EAT)

Yalho, Yahlo is an ancient town located in the eastern Bari region of Puntland, Somalia, about 50 kilometres (31 mi) south of Bosaso. The town forms part of Bosaso district local government.

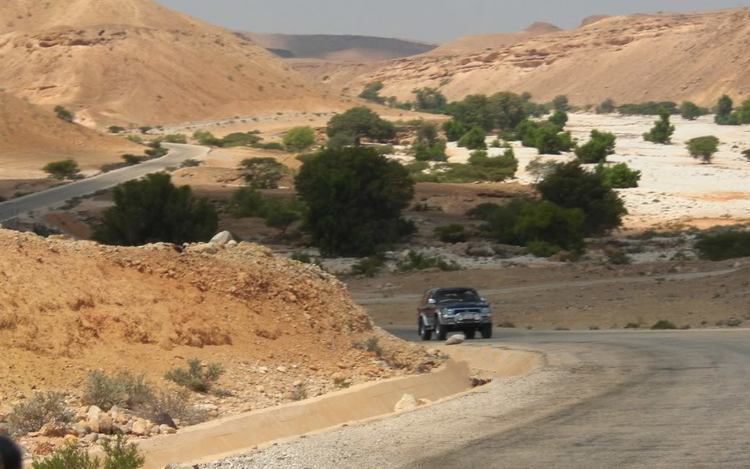
Yalho valley, stoppage point during flash floods which blocking travel flow from, to Bosaso

== Demography ==
The residents of Yalho mostly hail the sub-clans of Dishishe and Darod.
