= Hadhwanaag =

- Village (tuulada)
- Interactive map of Hadhwanaag
- Coordinates: 8°31′49.9″N 48°09′55.4″E
- Country: Puntland(Somalia) / Somaliland
- Region: Sool

Population
  - Total: 850
- Time zone: UTC+3 (EAT)

Relation map. Ha=Hadhwanaag, Bo=Bo'ame, Bi=Birta Dheer, Ga=Garowe

Hadhwanaag (Hadh-Wanaag) is a village in the Sool region of Puntland. (Somaliland claims ownership of the whole Sool region.)

There are other places of the same name, Hadhwanaag, in the Somalis residential area.

== History ==
Hadhwanaag was founded in 1982.

In April 2012, by drought and water shortage in parts of Sool, Hadhwanaag was also affected.

In January 2018, due to the Battle of Tukaraq, Tukaraq and other schools were evacuated to Hadhwanaag and other places.

In December 2019, Puntland Vice President Ahmed Elmi Osman invited former Somali Prime Minister Omar Sharmarke to Hadhwanaag for lunch.

In January 2020, Puntland Vice President Ahmed Elmi Osman had a meeting in Hadhwanaag with Mohammed Said Hersi Morgan, Ahmed Abdi Mohamed and others.

In January 2020, the Puntland Ministry of Environment spread a chemical to control desert locust between Bo'ame and Hadhwanaag.

In June 2021, the governor of Sool, appointed by the Somaliland government, accused the Puntland government of interfering in Hadhwanaag as a violation of its territory.

In January 2022, Puntland Vice President Ahmed Elmi Osman appointed a committee to review the decisions of the Hadhwanaag Constituent Assembly. The committee will oversee the Bo'ame and Birta Dheer militias.
