= Foar =

- Village
- Location in Somalia.
- Coordinates: 10°20′00″N 50°54′00″E
- Country: Somalia: Puntland
- Region: Bari
- Time zone: UTC+3 (EAT)

Foar is a village in the northeastern Bari region of Somalia, on the coast of the Guardafui Channel. It is a center for the local lobster market.
