= Bargal District =

Bargal
- District
- Country: Somalia: Puntland
- Region: Bari
- Capital: Bargal
- Time zone: UTC+3 (EAT)

Bargal District is a district in the northeastern Bari region of Somalia. Its capital is located at Bargal.
