= Qandala District =

Qandala
- District
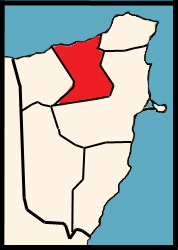
- Country: Somalia: Puntland
- Region: Bari
- Capital: Qandala
- Time zone: UTC+3 (EAT)

Qandala District (Somali: Degmada Qandala), also spelled Candala District is a district in the northeastern Bari region of Somalia. Its capital lies at Qandala (Candala).
