= Qardho District =

Qardho
- District
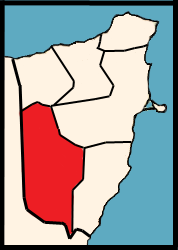
- Country: Somalia
- Regional State: Puntland
- Region: Bari
- Capital: Qardho
- Time zone: UTC+3 (EAT)

Qardho District (Somali: Degmada Qardho) is a district in the region in Puntland, Somalia. The district had previously been in the northeastern Bari region before this was split into two. Its capital lies at Qardho.
