= Armo District =

Armo
- District
- Country: Somalia; Puntland
- Region: Bari

Population
  - Total: 60,000
- Time zone: UTC+3 (EAT)

Armo District is a district in the northeastern Bari province of Somalia. Situated 100 km south of Bosaso, it is one of the fastest growing administrative divisions in the autonomous Puntland region, with over 60000 inhabitants. Armo was founded in 1995 and attained official district status in 2003. The district is a local tourist hub, especially during the hot summer months. It is also home to the Armo Police Academy, which trains Somali Police Force cadets from various regions. The institution opened on December 20, 2005. The city also has the biggest hospital in all of Puntland where more serious injuries are treated.
