= Iskushuban District =

Iskushuban
- District
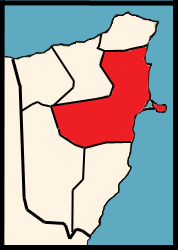
- Country: Somalia: Puntland
- Region: Bari
- Capital: Iskushuban
- Time zone: UTC+3 (EAT)

Iskushuban District (Somali: Degmada Iskushuban) is a district in the northeastern Bari region of Somalia. Its capital lies at Iskushuban.
