= Iskushuban =

Iskushuban Scusciuban
- Town
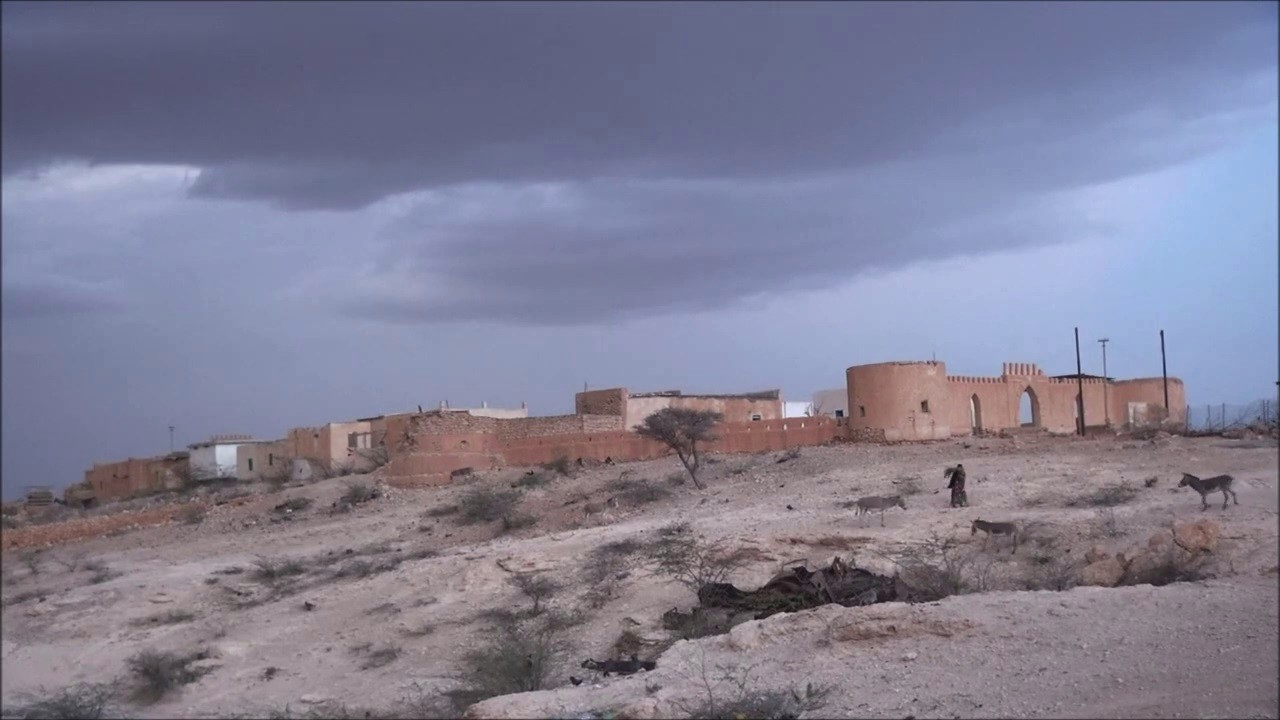
- The citadel

- Location in Somalia.
- Coordinates: 10°17′0″N 50°14′0″E
- Country: Somalia
- Regional State: Puntland
- Region: Bari
- District: Iskushuban

Government
  - Mayor: Musa Ali Musa

Population
  - Total: 37,000
- Time zone: UTC+3 (EAT)

Iskushuban (Somali: Iskushubaan, Italian: Scusciuban) is a small town in the northeastern Bari province of Somalia on the Horn of Africa. A historical settlement, it is situated in the autonomous Puntland state. It lies along the 50th meridian east.

== Overview ==
Iskushuban is the centre of the Iskushuban District. It lies 80 km east of Qardho and 150 km south of Bosaso, the commercial capital of the Puntland region.

In the Arie valley, midway between the town and Qardho, once lay a sizeable city that had considerable structures with thick walls.

Iskushuban is renowned for its seasonal waterfalls, which are the second largest in the country after those at Lamadaya in the northern Sanaag region.

In the early modern period, Iskushuban was a part of the Majeerteen Sultanate (Migiurtinia), centered in Aluula. It was later incorporated into Italian Somaliland during the early 20th century.

== Demographics ==
Iskushuban has a population of around 17,000 inhabitants. The broader Iskushuban District has a total population of 45,027 residents.

== Education ==
Iskushuban has a number of academic institutions. According to the Puntland Ministry of Education, there are 8 primary schools in the Iskushuban District. Among these are Timirshe, Meeladeen, Gargoore and Iskushuban Primary.

== Gallery ==
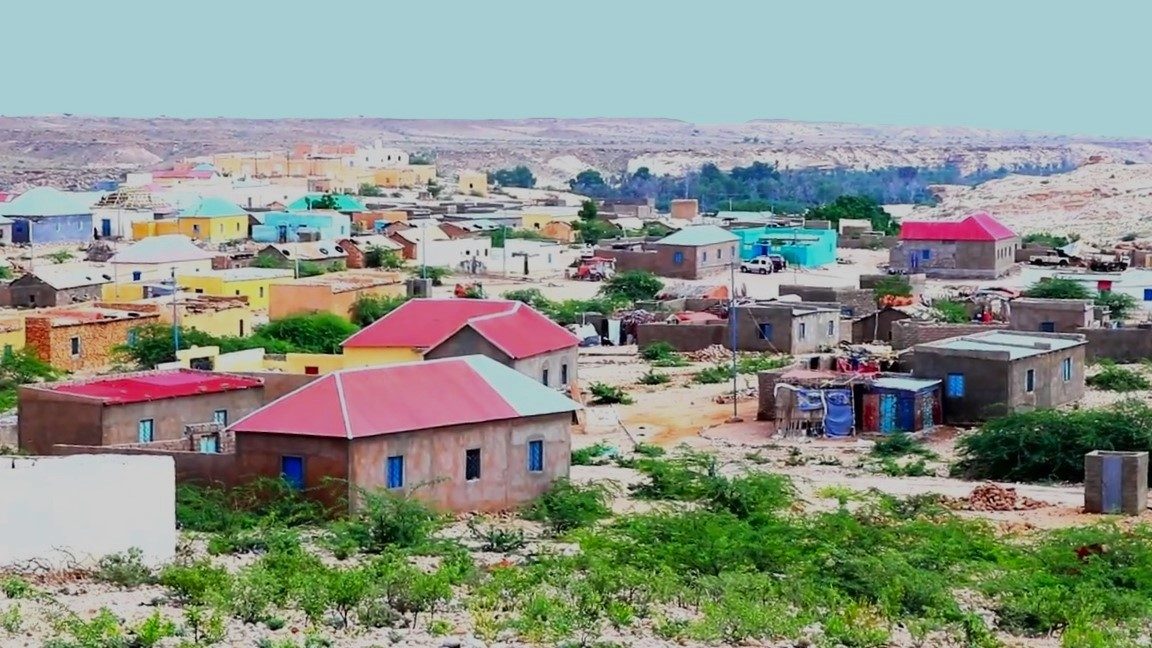
A view of Iskushuban

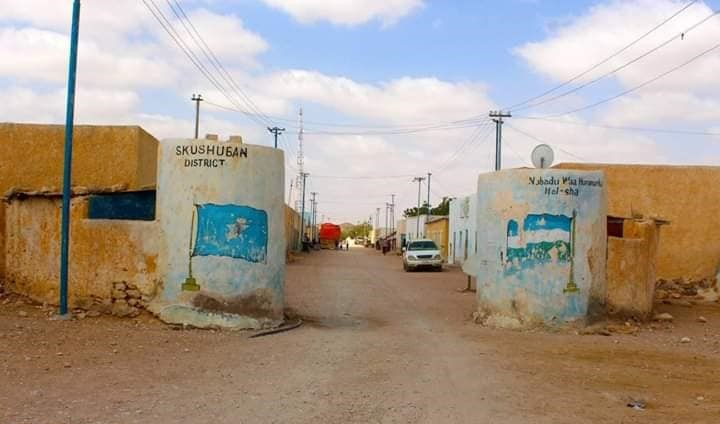
Entering main street
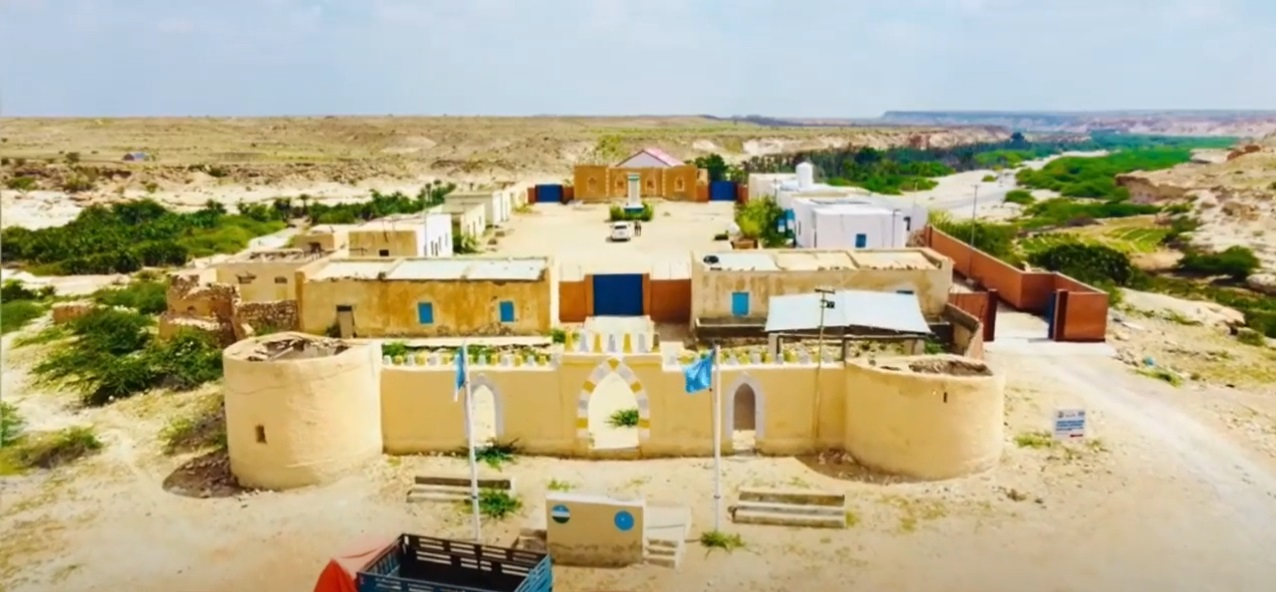
Front view of the Italian fortress/citadel

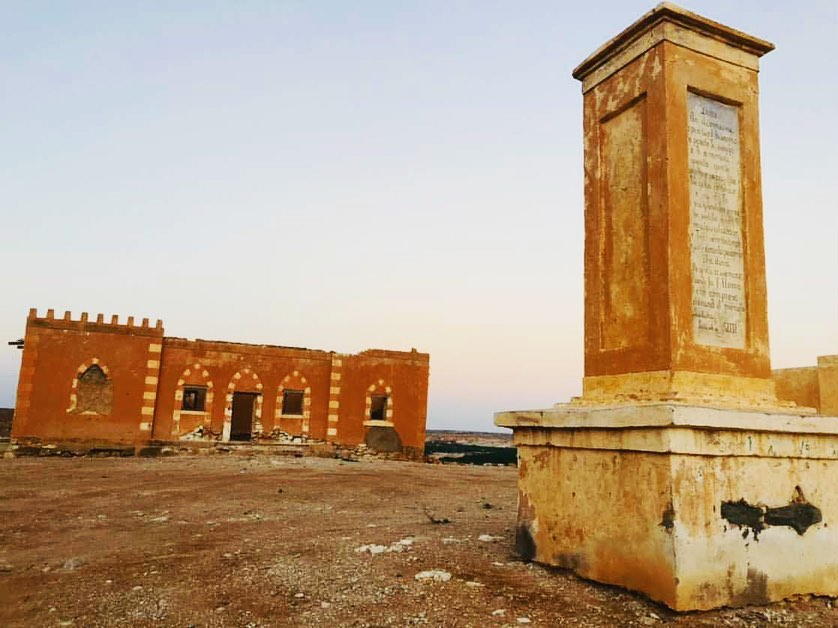
Italian stele in the citadel
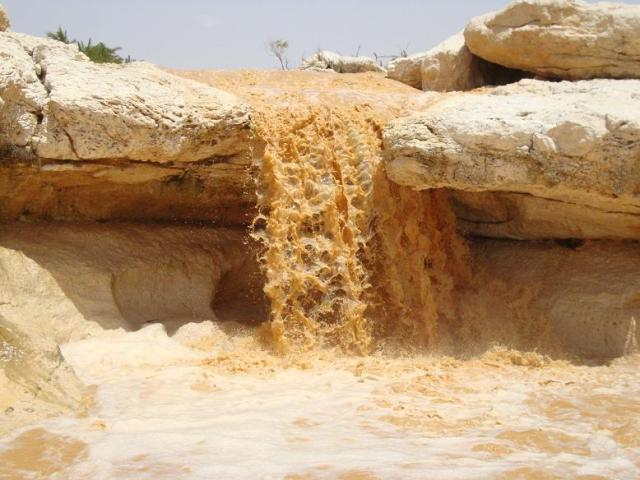
Iskushuban waterfalls

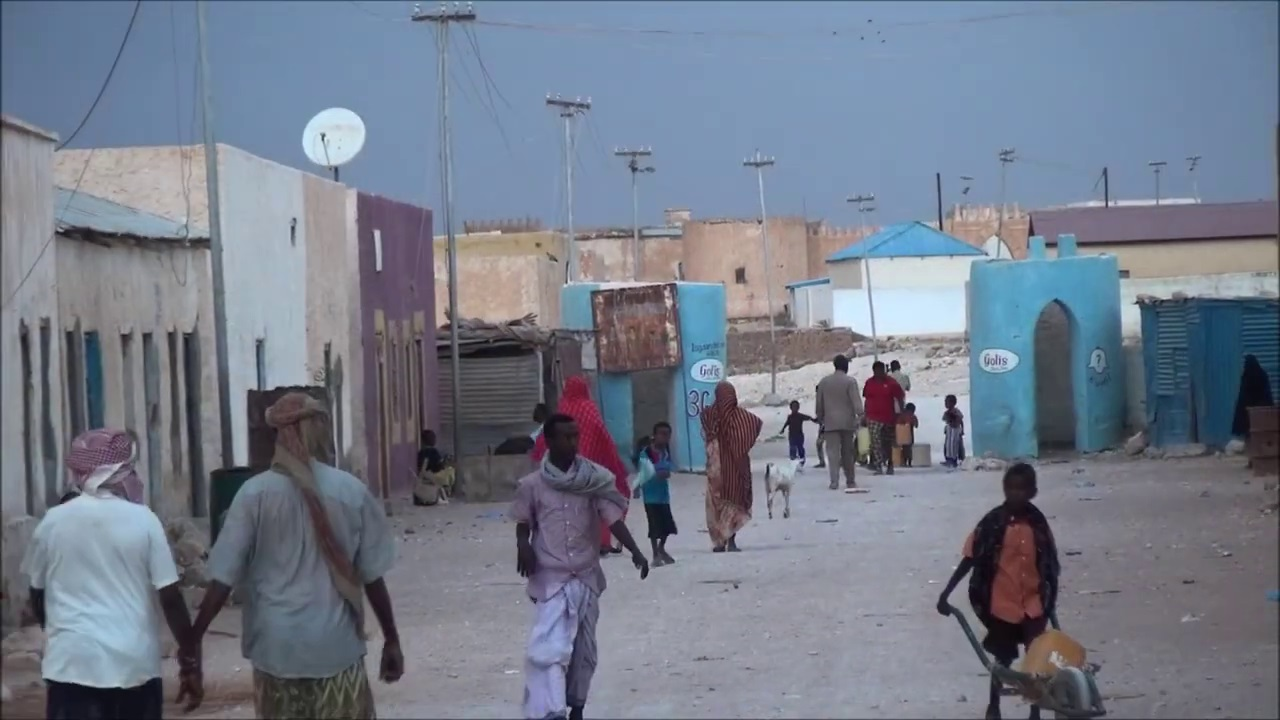
Main street
