= Habo, Somalia =

Ancient coastal settlement in Puntland, Somalia

Habo Xaabo
- Town
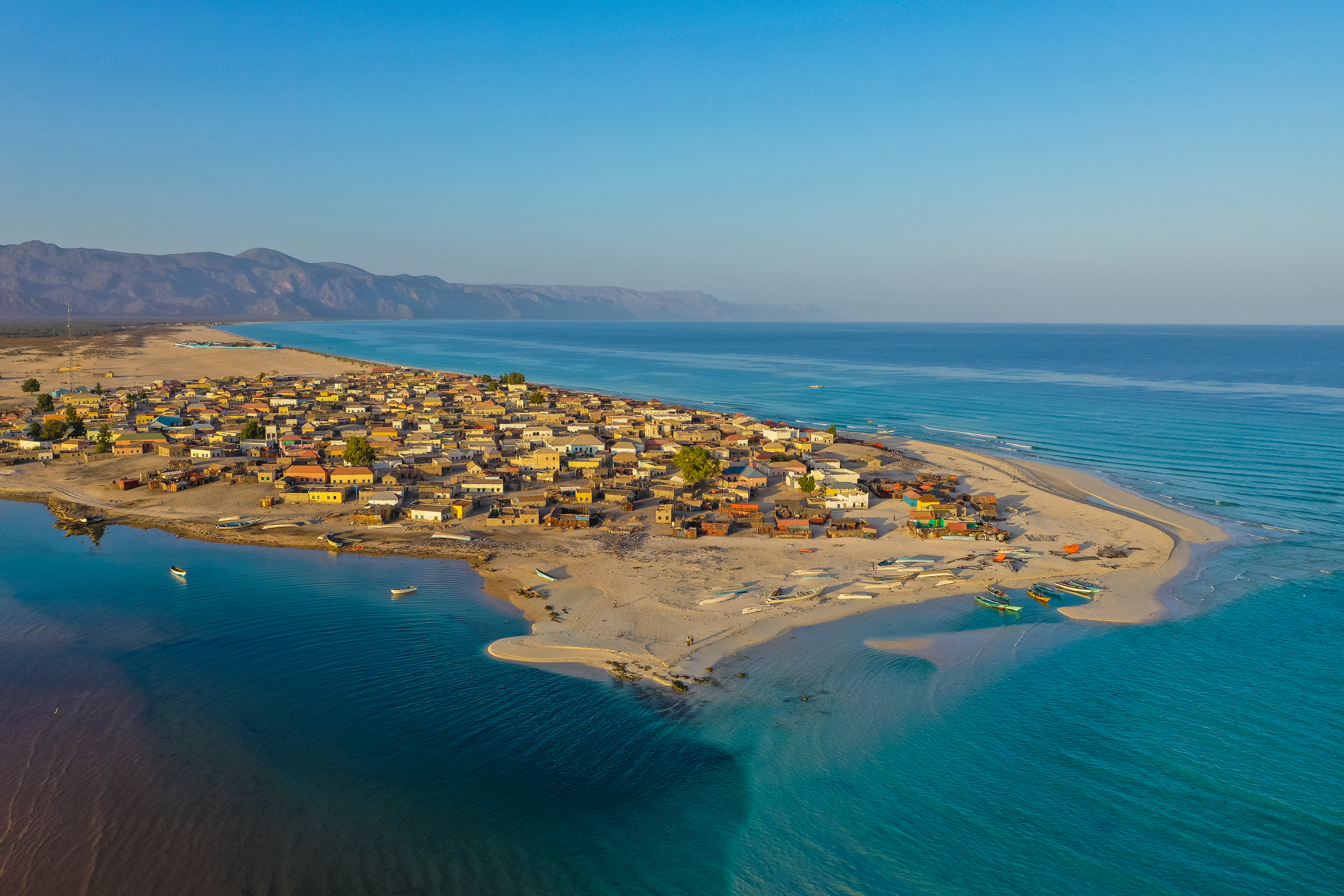

- Location in Somalia Habo (Horn of Africa)
- Coordinates: 11°47′N 50°31′E
- Country: Somalia; Puntland
- Region: Bari
- District: Alula District
- Time zone: UTC+3 (EAT)

Habo (Somali: Xaabo lit "firewood") is a historic coastal town situated in the Alula District of the Bari region in Puntland, northeastern Somalia. It lies near the vicinity of the Guardafui Channel and between the towns of Alula and Qandala. No demographic information about the population of Xaabo is currently known. However, the broader Alula District and much of the Bari region are predominantly inhabited by the Harti clan, particularly the Majeerteen and the Dishiishe.

== History ==
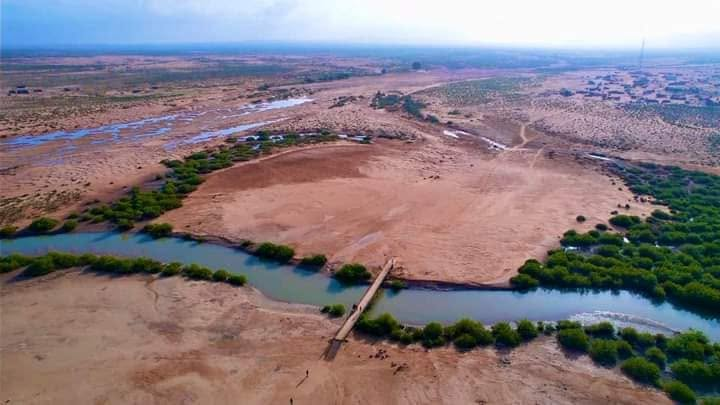
Butiyaalo River in the town of Habo, flowing toward the coast of Habo.

Habo is an ancient settlement and among the madīnah (historical towns) of Puntland. It first appeared in written records during the reign of Pharaoh Thutmose III in an inscription from the temple of Karnak where it is listed as among the places within the Land of Punt. Its name is mentioned as Hebu (shortened to Heb), or Set-Hebu/Hebnu, a toponym identified with the modern town by the French Egyptologist François Auguste Mariette. Following the decline of the Punt civilization, Habo re-emerged as an independent trading port (emporium) in the 1st century AD alongside other anciet Somali city states and remained active throughout Classical Antiquity and Late Antiquity. It is later documented in the Periplus of the Erythraean Sea and the 2nd-century Geographia of Claudius Ptolemy. No historical accounts of the town exist during the medieval period.

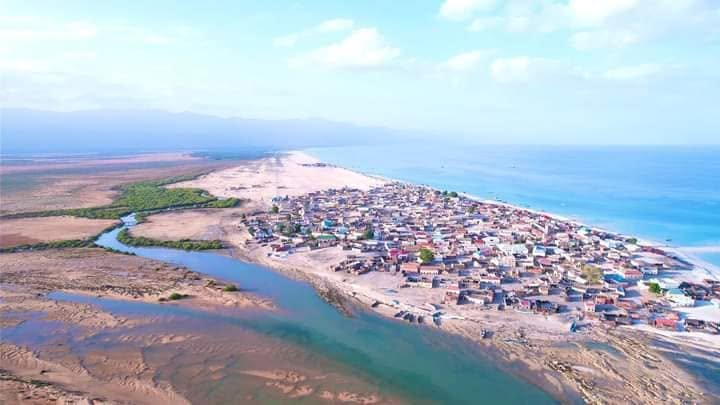
Panoramic view of the coastal town of Habo.

Habo rose to prominence during the early modern period under the Majeerteen Sultanate, and later in the colonial and post-colonial eras. During these periods, it experienced urban growth driven by its location on the banks of the Butiyaalo River, which empties near Habo and forms a fertile coastal delta in the vicinity of the town. It developed into a permanent settlement characterized by coastal Somali architecture made of wood and coral stone (hence its namesake), similar to that of the Benaadir cities in the south. Habo suffered severe damage from Italian bombardment during the Campaign of the Sultanates in the late 1920s, which destroyed much of its architectural heritage.

== Economy and Education ==
The main economic activities in the town are fishing, frankincense and date farming. Habo Tuna Factory is the largest employer in the town with 400 employees. According to the Puntland Ministry of Education, there is 1 primary school in Habo.

== Gallery ==
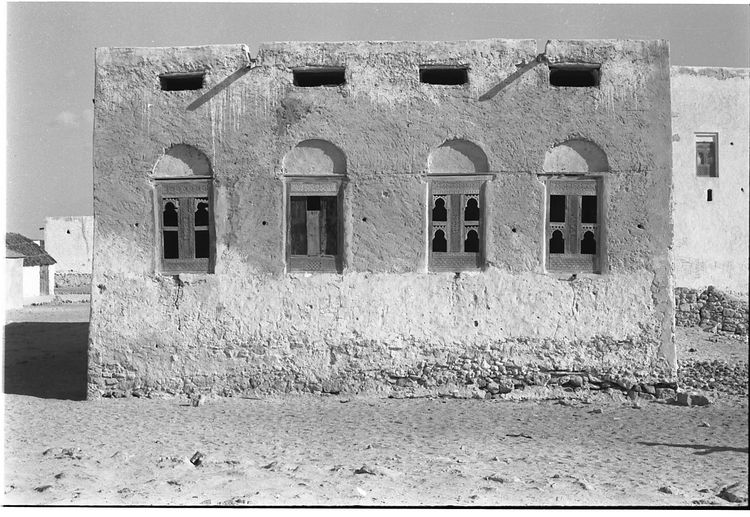
House in Habo with wooden windows

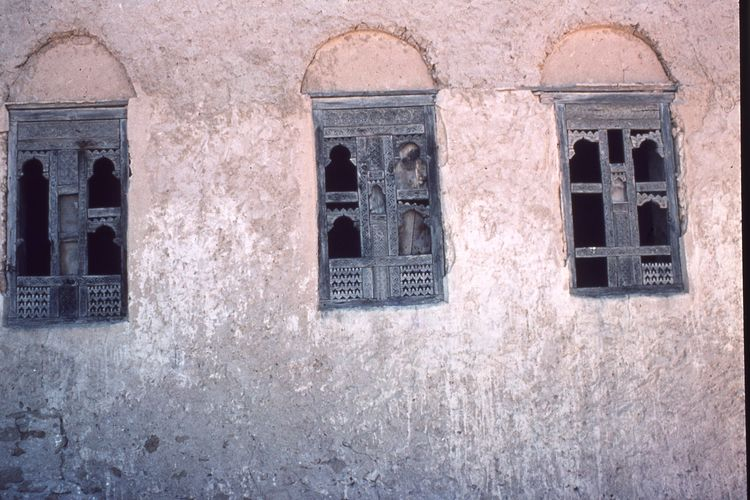
Carved wooden windows in Habo

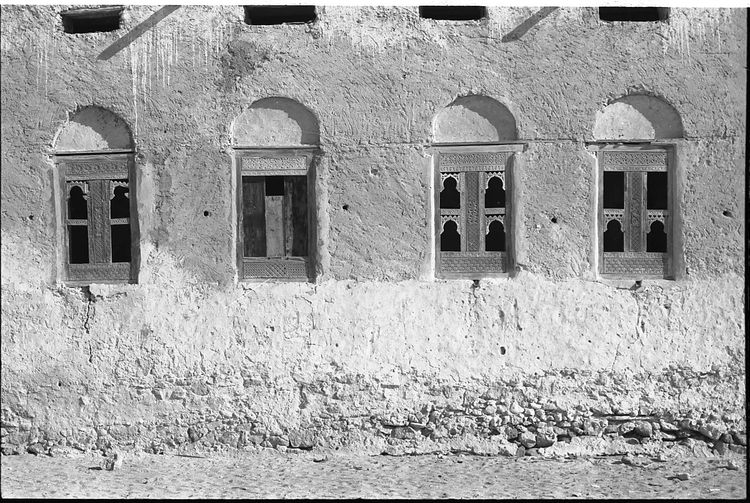
Windows of a building in Habo

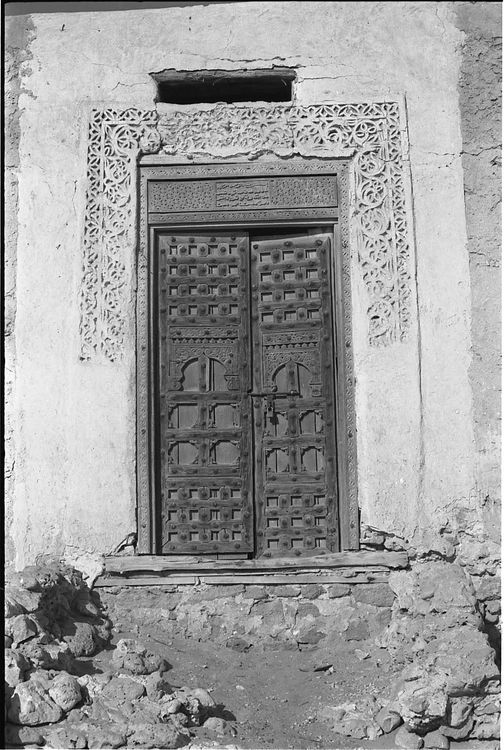
Wooden doorway entrance of a building in Habo.
