= Waiye =

- Town
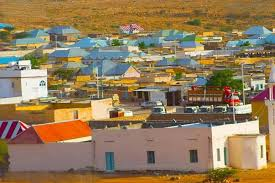
- Overview picture of Waiye town

- Location within Somalia
- Coordinates: 10.01122°N 49.04568°E
- Country: Somalia: Puntland
- Region: Bari, Somalia
- District: Waiye

Government
  - Mayor: Ahmed Hassan Barre
- Time zone: UTC+3 (EAT)

Waiye (Somali: Waaciye) is a town in the Bari province of the autonomous Puntland region in northeastern Somalia.

== Overview ==
Waiye is situated in the Waiye District of the Sanaag province. Waiye has a number of academic institutions. In the Waiye District, there are ten primary schools, according to the Puntland Ministry of Education. Faruuq, Jurile, Khalid Binuwalid, and Waiye Primary are a few of these. Secondary schools in the area include Waiye Secondary.

== TVET Center ==
Technical and vocational education and training (Tvet) programme was implemented in Waiye, the programme was funded by the european union with Germany government contributed most of fund through its Federal Ministry for Economic Cooperation and Development - BMZ, and implemented by GIZ. The center which composes four different faculties is intended to grow the capacity and skills of Somalia workforce and produce professionals equipped with necessary modern skills.

== Demographics ==
The broader Waiye district has roughly population of 23, 241 residents.
