= Qandala =

- Town
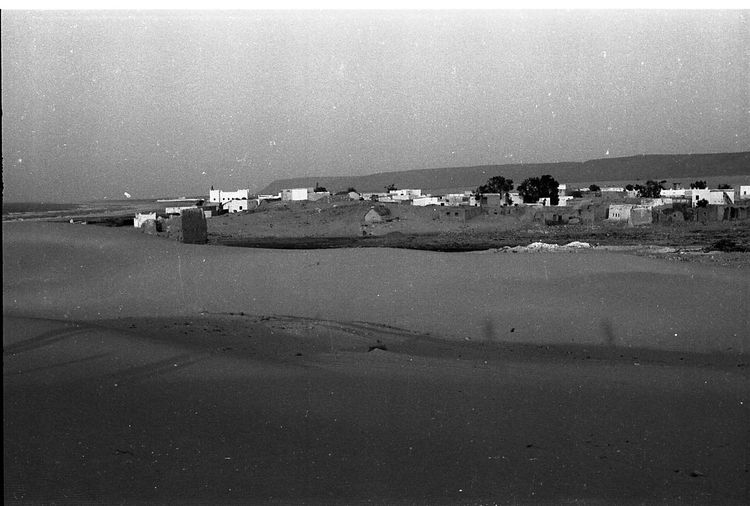
- 1984 view of the town of Qandala as photographed by Neville Chittick.

- Location in Somalia
- Coordinates: 11°28′16″N 49°52′26″E
- Country: Somalia: Puntland
- Region: Bari
- District: Qandala

Population
  - Total: 19,300
- Time zone: UTC+3 (EAT)

Qandala (Note: The name of the town has appeared in various forms, including Candala, Andala, Bender Chor, Bandar Kor, Bender Kor, and Qandalla.) is an ancient port town situated in the Qandala District of the Bari region in the autonomous state of Puntland, northeastern Somalia. With a population of around 19,300 inhabitants, Qandala sits on a wadi estuary, which forms a natural protective harbor for vessels on the Gulf of Aden. It lies 75 kilometres (47 mi) east of the capital Bosaso.

== History ==
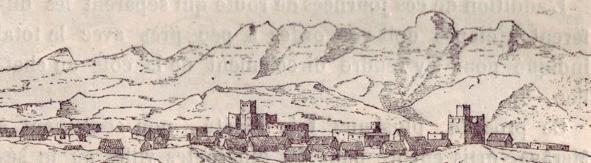
19th-century illustration of Qandala.

A historic settlement of thousands of years old, Qandala is among the madīnah (historical towns) of Puntland and one of the oldest towns in Somalia. It first appears in written records in the 1st century AD, as mentioned by the anonymous author of the Periplus of the Erythraean Sea. In the Periplus, Qandala is referred to as TabaTege. It was part of the ancient Somali trading ports that flourished in far northeastern Somalia during Classical and Late Antiquity. They were renowned in the Greco-roman and Near Eastern world for their luxury goods such as incense, gums, and aromatic woods, exported to Roman Egypt, Arabia, Persia, Aksumites Troglodica, and as far as India. Its nickname Gacanka Hodonka (“Gulf of Prosperity”) is a relic from this era, with the abundance of incense resins grown in its nearby mountain ranges of Cal Miskat, where frankincense and myrrh resins are found and harvested by the locals, forming a traditional economy of the sparsely populated arid region of Bari, which shaped the economic livelihood of its inhabitants.

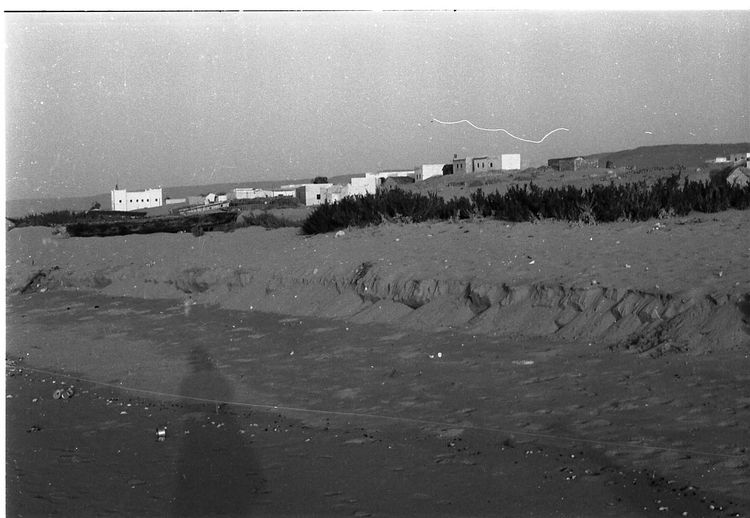
View of the town of Qandala.

Qandala re-emerged during the early modern period under the Majeerteen Sultanate as an important seaport in the commerce between Majeerteenia and southern Arabia, as well as Egypt and India. It served as one of the coastal trading hubs of the Majeerteen along with Hafun, Bargal, Habo, Caluula, and Bosaso. A castle built during this period is among the architectural heritage that survived from the Majeerteen era.

=== 2016 ISIL capture ===
On 26 October 2016, a militant group linked to ISIL captured Qandala with 50 armed fighters after a brief firefight with local security forces, thus becoming the first town to be seized by Islamic State affiliated militants in Somalia. BBC News reported that ISIL militants had withdrawn from the town for unclear reasons. However, the report was denied by other media outlets claimed that it was false. On 7 December 2016, a Somali official said Puntland security forces had recaptured the port from ISIL-linked fighters, killing 30 militants. Another four soldiers were also killed during the operation.

== Education ==
Qandala has a number of academic institutions. According to the Puntland Ministry of Education, there are 15 primary schools in the Qandala District. Among these are Xamure, Dhadar, Turmasale and Gurur.

== Transportation ==
Qandala has a small seaport. Air transportation in the city is served by the Candala Airport.

== See also ==
- Caluula
- Habo
- Bargal
- Hafun
