= Alula District =

District in Bari, Somalia

Alula
- District
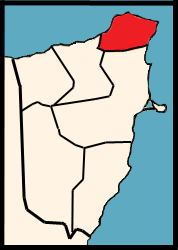
- Country: Somalia: Puntland
- Region: Bari
- Capital: Alula
- Time zone: UTC+3 (EAT)

Alula District (Somali: Caluula District) is a district in the northeastern Bari region of Somalia. Its capital lies at Alula. This district contains Cape Guardafui, the very northeastern tip of the Horn of Africa. In the northeast, it faces the Guardafui Channel.

In the night of 27 August 2017 unidentified foreign aircraft carried out airstrikes on a coastal town in the Bari region close to Alula, killing many animals and inflicting casualties on the local herders. Though U.S. forces often carry out such airstrikes in Somalia, targeting Al Shabaab and ISIL militants, local leaders stated that there were no bases of these militants in the area hit by the bombardment.

== Towns ==
- Alula
- Habo
- Bereeda
