= Karkaar =

Administrative region in Puntland, Somalia

Coordinates: 9°55′N 49°24′E

Karkaar is a mountain range which ranges from Somalia's northwestern border with Ethiopia, until Cape Guardafui. It is also an administrative region defined by the autonomous Puntland state. The territory occupies the south of what has traditionally been the Bari region of Somalia, and generally lies south of the Karkaar mountain range.

Since the Somali Civil War, the Karkaar mountains are often referred to as the Golis Mountains. According to the CULTURAL ORIENTATION SOMALI published by the Defense Language Institute in 2020, the Golis Mountains is another name for the Galgala Hills, part of the Karkaar mountain range. The Ogo Highlands are south of the Karkaar mountain range.
