= Bari, Somalia =

Region of Puntland

Bari
- Region
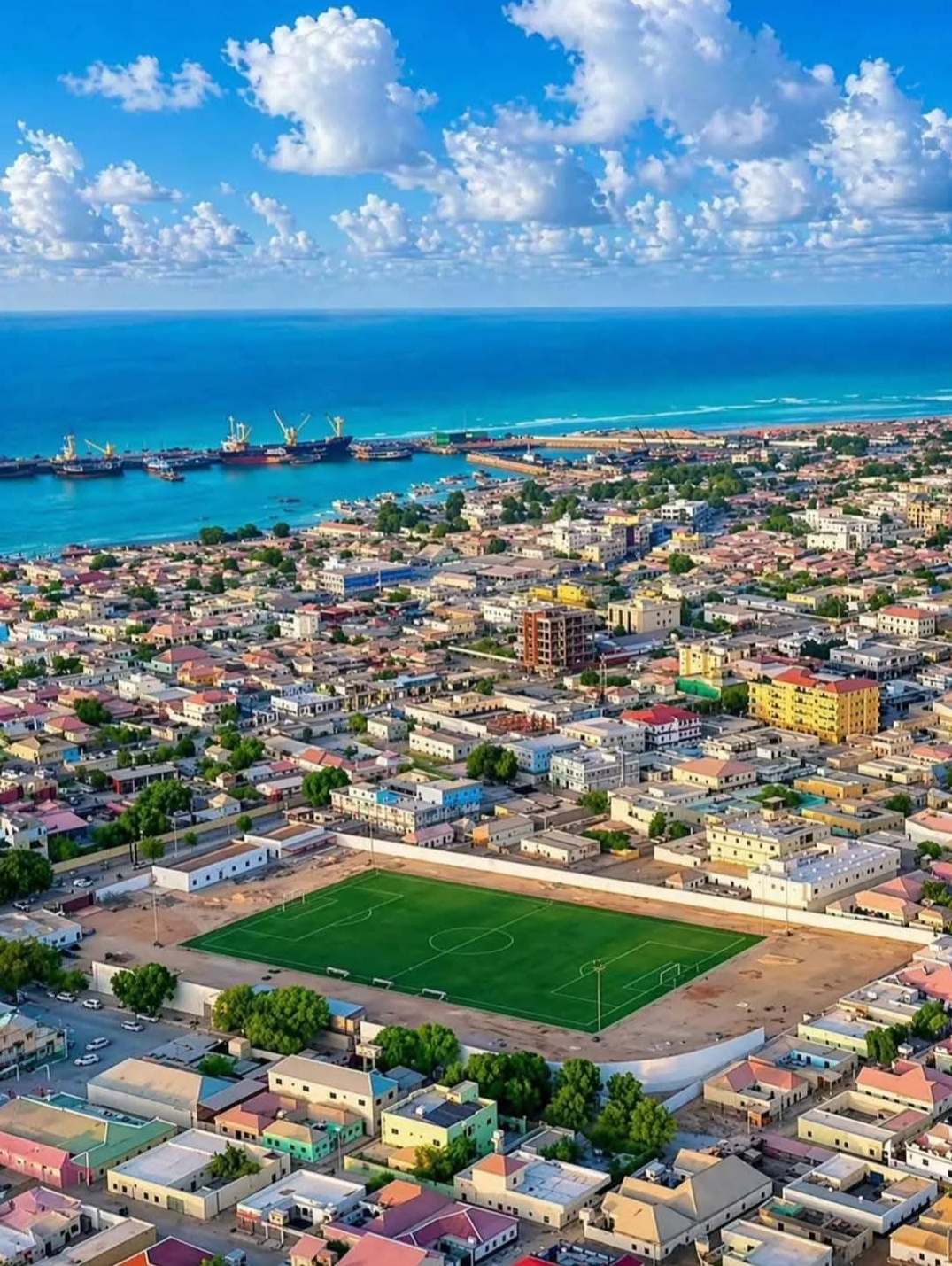
- Bosaso: 2026

- Location in Africa
- Coordinates: 11°17′47″N 48°00′00″E
- Country: Somalia
- Capital and largest: Bosaso

Government
  - Type: Region
  - Governor: Abdirizak Ali Said (13 January 2022)

Area
  - Total: 85,088 km^{2} (32,853 sq mi)

Population (2019 estimate)
  - Total: 949,700
  - Density: 11.16/km^{2} (28.91/sq mi)
- Time zone: UTC+3 (EAT)
- Area code: 252
- ISO 3166 code: SO-BR
- HDI (2022): 0.429 low · 4th of 18

Bari (Somali: Bari, Arabic: بري) is an administrative region (gobol) in northeastern Somalia that consists of six districts: Qandala, Iskushuban, Alula, Bosaso, Bandarbeyla, and Qardho. The port city of Bosaso is the capital of the region and the largest city in Bari. The region is part of the autonomous Somali state of Puntland.

== Overview ==
It is bordered by Sool and Sanaag to the west, Nugal to the south, the Gulf of Aden to the north and the Guardafui Channel to the east. It is located on the tip of the Horn of Africa. Its name, Bari, literally means East in Somali.

In terms of landmass, Bari is the largest region in Somalia. The highest point in this region is Mount Bahaya, the third tallest mountain in Somalia with an elevation of 2120 meters; other notable peaks include Karkaar and Cal Miskaad mountains.

In 2024, Islamic State (IS) fighters wrested control of the Cal Miskaad (Al Miskaad) mountain range in Bari from rival militant group Al Shabaab.

== Demographics ==
Most of the inhabitants of the Bari region belong to the Somali ethnic group including Majeerteen, Leelkase, Deshiishe, Warsangeli, Kaskiqabe Darood clans, Mehri, Madhibaan and other clans According to the 2015 Population Estimation Survey, the population was 1,887,568 inhabitants. This figure combines both the rural and urban populations of Bari as well all IDPs (internally displaced persons).

== Administrative divisions ==
Populated places in Bari.
AfR=Af Ruugleey, AfU=Af Urur, Al=Alula, Ar=Armo, As=Ashira, Bari, Bc=Bacaad, BD=Balli Dhiddin, Be=Bereeda, BG=Bargal, BL=Bayla, Ba=Bacaad, BC=Booco, Bo=Bosaso, BS=Bandar Siyada, Bu=Bur Gaban, Da=Dalweyn, Da=Dangorayo, El=El Dahir, Ju=Juurile, ER=El Dhurre, Fo=Foar, Ga=Galgala, Hb= Habeeno, Ge=Geesaley, Gu=Gumbah, Ha=Hafun, Hb=Habo, Is=Iskushuban, Ka=Karin, Ko=Kob Dhexaad, La=Laas Dawaco, Ma=Majiyohan, Mu=Murcanyo, Qh=Qardho, Ql=Qandala, RB=Ras Binnah, RR=Rako Raaxo, Ta=Tager, Ti=Tisjiic, To=Tohen, Uf=Ufeyn, Uu=Uur Caleed, Wa=Waiye, XD=Xidda, Xi=Xiriiro, Yak=Yake, Yal=Yalho

In the official administrative divisions of Somalia, the Bari region consists of seven districts.

The Bari region is the largest region of the 18 administrative regions of Somalia and it contains following districts.

- Bosaso District The capital and largest
- Qardho District
- Alula District
- Bandarbayla District
- Waiye
- Iskushuban District
- Qandala District
- Carmo District
- Ufayn District

In 1998, Bari became a part of Puntland, an autonomous region in northeastern Somalia. In the Transitional Constitution of the Puntland Regional Government of 2001, Puntland's territory is defined in terms of Somalia's official regions, Bari being one of them.

In the years thereafter, Puntland changed its internal administrative division, and the Bari region was split in two: the southern half, roughly coinciding with the Qardho and Bandarbayla Districts, became the new region of Karkaar (also spelled as Karkar). It was subdivided into five new districts: Qardho, Bandarbayla, Waiye, Rako and Hafun Armo District. The northern half continued to be known as Bari and was split into seven districts: five of them keeping their original names (Bosaso, Iskushuban, Ufayn, Qandala and Alula), as well as three new ones: Carmo, Tisjiic and Bargal.

Radio Galkacyo reported on 19 April 2011 that a new administration, called Raas Asayr, had been declared in parts of Bari Region. Farah Mahmud Yusuf was reported to have been elected as its president. Later, Barre Fatah Said there were possibilities of starting negotiation between Puntland Government and the founders of Raas Assayr state. The leaders of this prospective polity retracted their claims a few months later in June 2012, indicating that they now supported Puntland and were satisfied with the Puntland authorities' new development projects in the region.

On 8 April 2013, the Puntland government announced the creation of a new region named Gardafuul. Carved out of the Bari region, it consists of three districts and has its capital at Alula.
