= Bargal =

Bargal Bargaal
- City
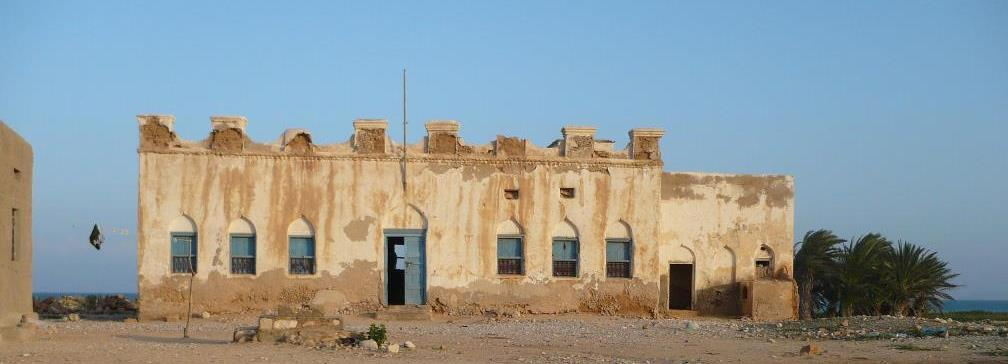
- Majeerteen Sultanate's residence palace

- Location in Somalia
- Coordinates: 11°17′07″N 51°04′34″E
- Country: Somalia
- Region: Bari
- District: Bargal
- Elevation: 8.5 m (28 ft)

Population
  - Total: 80,000
- Time zone: UTC+03:00 (EAT)

Bargal, also referred to as Bargaal is a coastal city situated in the Bargal District of the Bari region, Puntland State, northeastern Somalia. Located on the eastern coast of Bari, it serves as the center of the namesake district, which has a population of around 6,798 inhabitants. Bargal faces the Guardafui Channel in the Indian Ocean and lies 26 nautical miles (30 miles) north of Gumbah, 11 nautical miles (13 miles) north of Ras Binnah, 30 nautical miles (35 miles) south of Tohen, and 35 nautical miles (40 miles) south of Cape Guardafui.

== History ==
Bargal may have been founded during the early modern period, when it served as the seasonal headquarters of the Majeerteen Sultanate. The book Migiurtinia ed il Territorio del Nugál describes Bargal as the habitual residence of Boqor Osman Mahmud. The settlement was mainly inhabited by Majeerteen groups, including 800 of the Adan Abdirahman clan and 150 of the Osman Mahmud clan. It contained four forts, the king’s house, approximately 120 brick buildings, and around 200 huts. Drinking water, though slightly brackish, was available on site. The village was divided into two parts, Old Bargal and Eirod, with the Sultan residing in the latter. The monograph was written in early 1925, before the military occupation of the Sultanate. Bargal was bombed and destroyed on 28–29 October 1925.

=== Modern ===
In June 2007, it was the location of the Battle of Bargal. In 2012, the Puntland Highway Authority (PHA) announced a project to connect Bargal and other cities in Puntland to the main regional highway. The 750 km thoroughfare links major cities in the northern part of Somalia, such as Bosaso, Galkayo and Garowe, with towns in the south.

== Education ==
Bargal has a number of academic institutions. According to the Puntland Ministry of Education, there are three primary schools, one secondary school and institute in the Bargal District. These include Wadikhayr, Taageer, Qorraxad, Abdehan and Bargaal Primary.
