= Alula, Somalia =

Historic settlement in Puntland, Somalia

Alula Caluula
- town
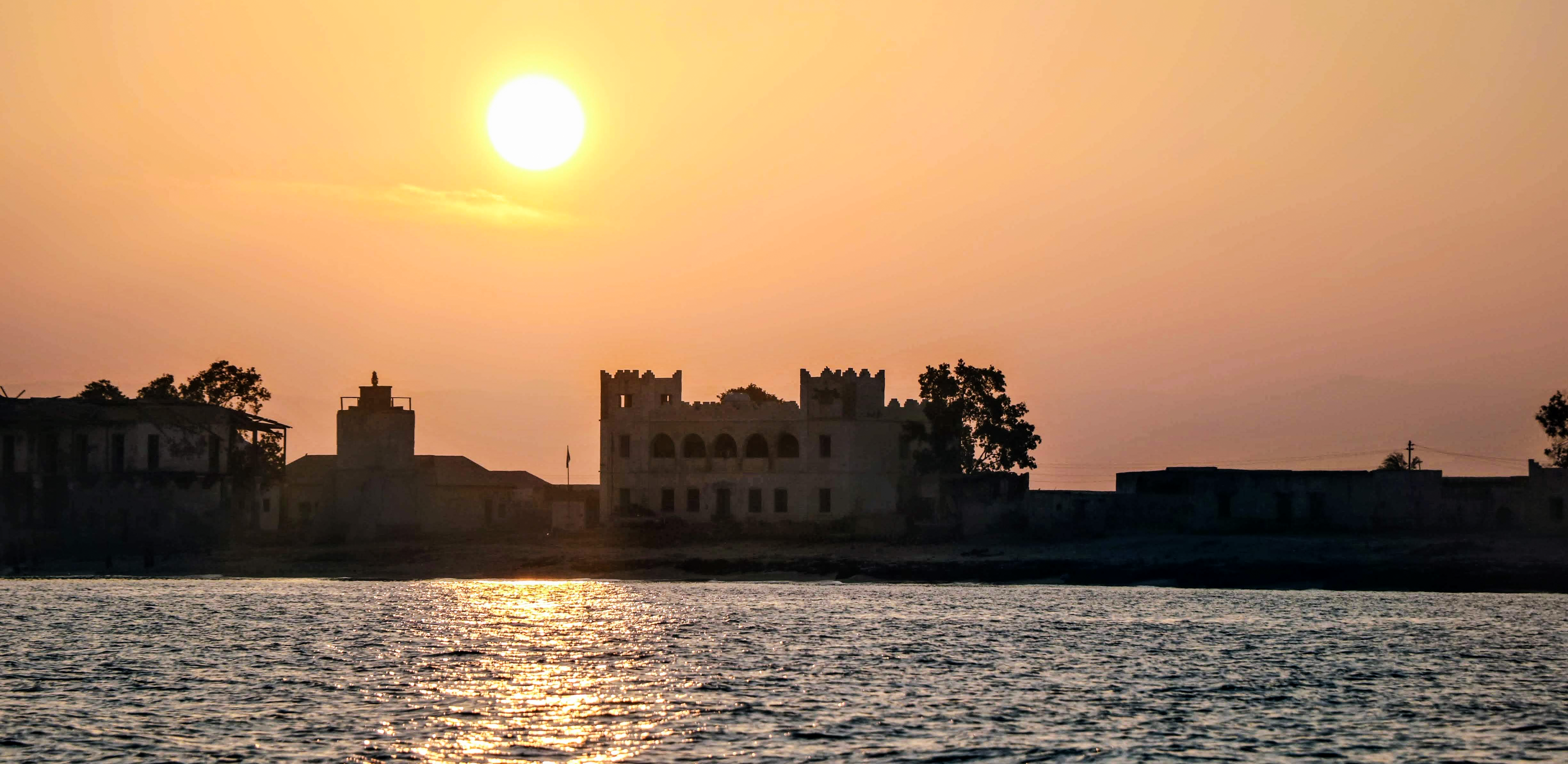
- Alula and its historic castle during sunset.

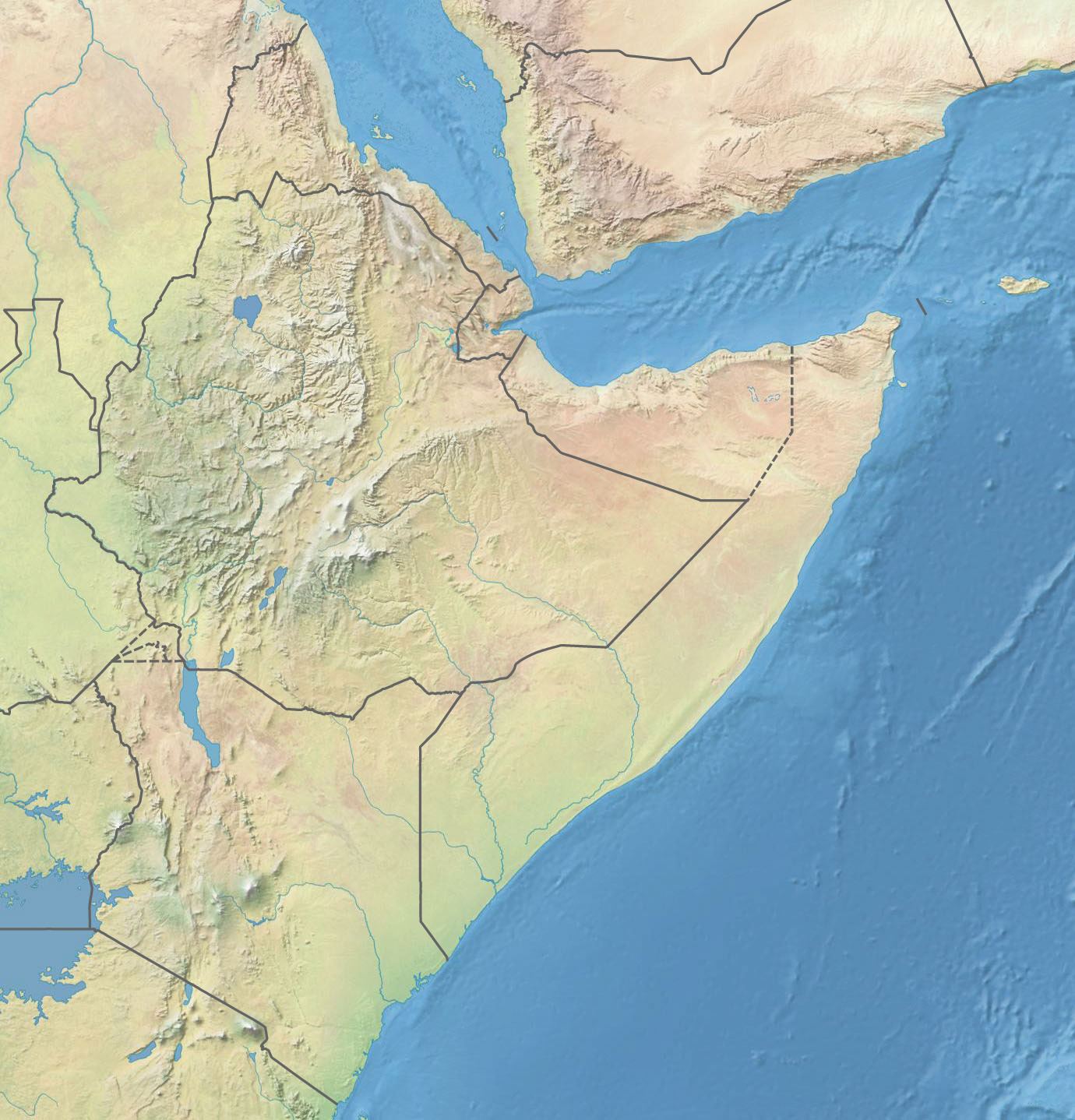
- Location in Somalia. Alula (Horn of Africa)
- Coordinates: 11°58′0″N 50°45′0″E
- Country: Somalia
- Regional State: Puntland
- Region: Ra'as Aseir
- District: Alula District

Government
  - Type: local government
  - Mayor: Abdullahi Isse Ordaye
- Time zone: UTC+3 (EAT)

Alula (Somali: Caluula), also spelled Aluula, is an ancient coastal town situated in the Ras Aseir region of the autonomous state of Puntland in northeastern Somalia. It lies on the coast of the Guardafui Channel about ten miles east of Ras Filuk and approximately 100 nautical miles from Bosaso. The name of the town consists of two Somali words: ‘Cal’ and ‘luul’. ‘Cal’ refers to a mountain range in northeastern Somalia, while ‘luul’ means pearl. Therefore, ‘Caluula’ (Alula) is interpreted to mean ‘the pearl of the Cal/al Mountains.

== History ==
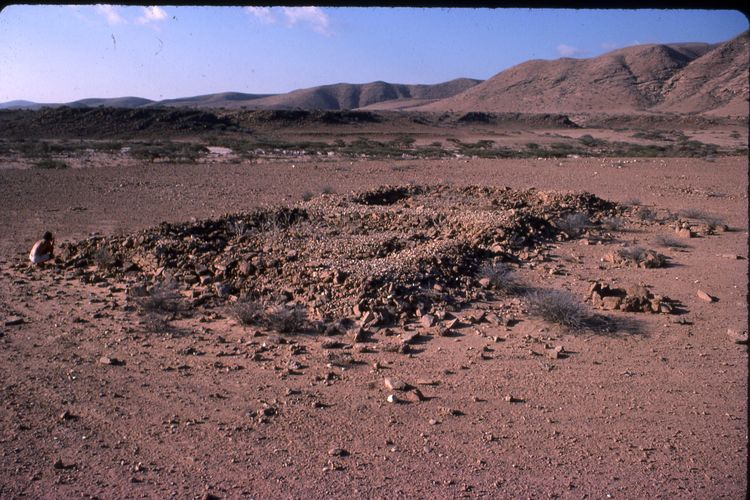
An ancient enclosed platform in the town of Caluula, photographed in 1975 by Neville Chittick. Neville Chittick sitting in the background overlooking the ruins.

Alula is one of the oldest towns in Somalia and among the madīnah (historical settlements) of Puntland's Bari region. It first appears in historical records in the 1st century AD, as mentioned by the anonymous author of the Periplus of the Erythraean Sea. In the Periplus, Calula/Caluula is referred to as Acannae (its Latinized form) while in the 2nd-century Geographia of Ptolemy it is designated as Akkania or Accana. It was part of the ancient Somali coastal trading ports that dominated northeastern Somalia (Puntland) during Classical and Late antiquity. A large laurel grove bearing the same name and situated in its vicinity yielded the finest and greatest quantity of frankincense known in Antiquity. This aromatic resin was called the far-side frankincense or the far-side incense (as it is produced in the remotest part of northern Somalia near Cape Guardafui), and in the Periplus as ‘peratic’ or ‘beyond the strait’ (that is, from the region beyond the strait of Bab el-Mandeb, here referring to northeastern Somalia). Through the emporium of Accana, incense resin and fragrant gums was exported to other market towns along the northern Somali coast such as Malao, Mosylon, Opone, Isis, Aromatica, and Avalites, which re-exported it after its arrival and further carried it across the Gulf of Aden and the Red Sea ( using beden ships) to Roman Egypt, Troglodica ( northern red sea region) and neighboring Arabia. Through this trade route, northeastern and northwestern Somalia were jointly connected by this incense trade route, going through inland and seashore caravan routes before crossing to southwestern Arabia (Yemen) and then to the Near East and India. This commerce was still active as late as the 6th century, as noted by Cosmas Indicopleustes in his Christian Topography.

=== Archeological remains ===
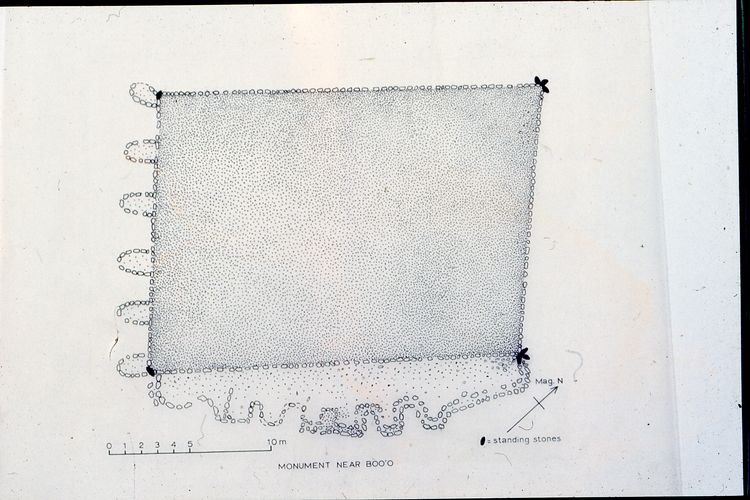
Plan of an ancient platform monument in Caluula, documented during the 1975–1976 archaeological survey led by Neville Chittick.

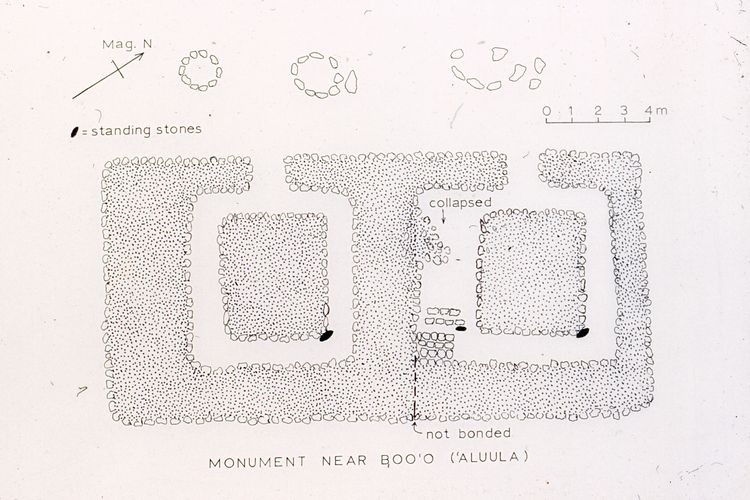
Plan of a platform in the town of Caluula, Puntland, Somalia. Recorded by Neville Chittick during the 1975–1976 archaeological survey.

The commercial prosperity of the Pre-islamic period and its legacy is represented by the ruins found in the town. On the coastal plain 20 km east of Alula are ruins of an ancient monument in a platform style. The structure is formed by a rectangular dry-stone wall of low height; the space in between is filled with rubble and manually covered with small stones. Relatively large standing stones (menhirs) are also positioned on the edifice's corners. Near the platform are graves and cairns, which are outlined in stones. Measuring 24 m by 17 m, the structure is the largest of a series of ancient platform and enclosed monuments exclusive to far northeastern Somalia. These were explored during the 1975–1976 archaeological surveys carried out by Neville Chittick under the supervision of the British Institute in Eastern Africa.

=== Medieval and early modern period ===
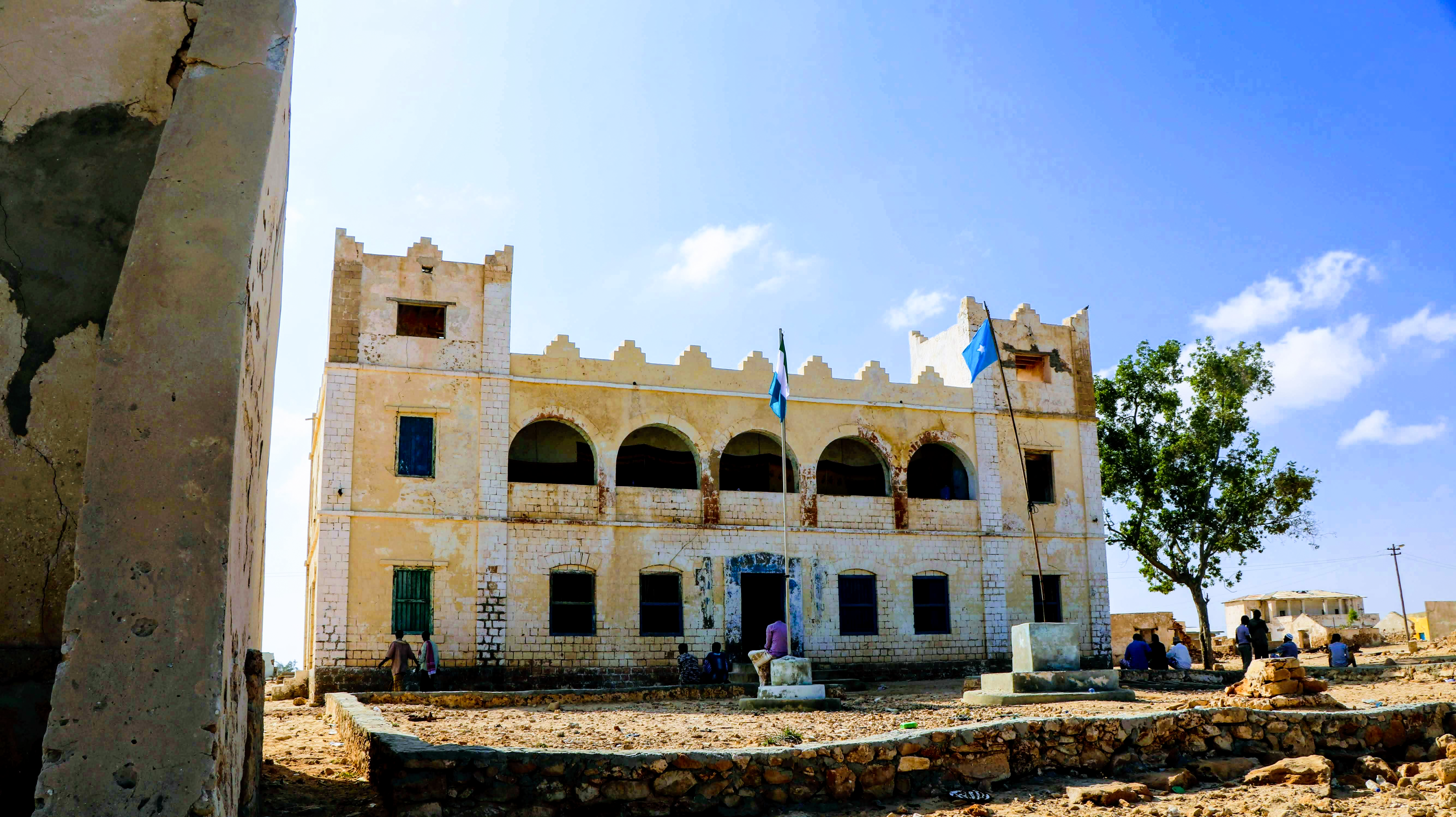
The Majeerteen castle from the early modern period in Calula.

Legendary Arab explorer Ahmad ibn Mājid wrote of Alula and a few other notable ports and landmarks of the northern Somali coast. During the early modern period, Alula served as the main capital of the Majeerteen Sultanate (Migiurtinia), which in the early 20th century fell under colonial Italian rule. A castle built in the city is one of a number of local remains from this era. Calula and other neighboring towns such as Hafun, Bargal, Qandala, and Habo suffered severe damage from Italian bombardment during the Campaign of the Sultanates in the late 1920s, which destroyed much of their architectural heritage.

=== Post-colonial and modern ===
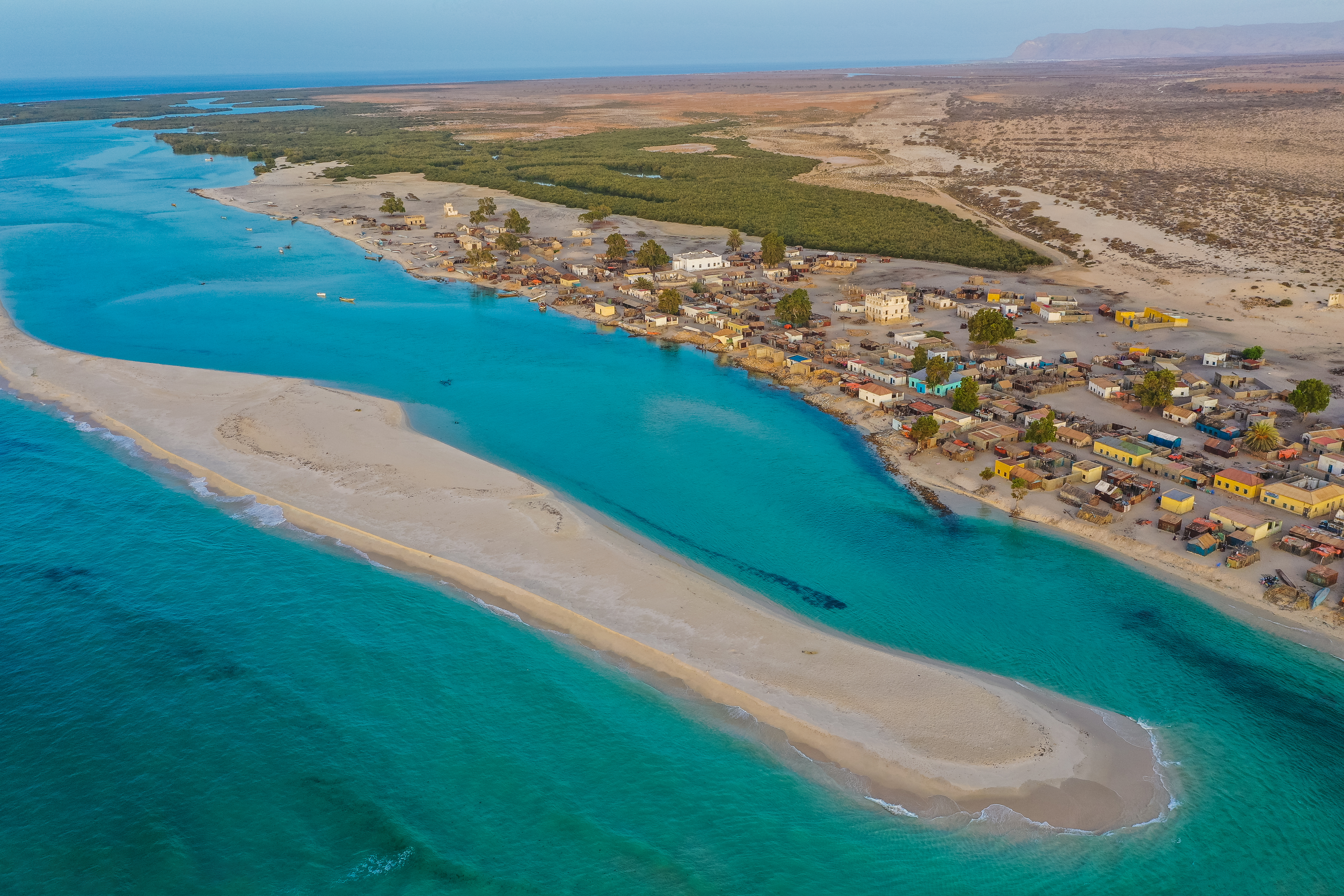
Aerial view of Alula town.

In the post-independence period, Alula became the principal town in the Alula District, situated in the autonomous Puntland state. On April 8, 2013, the Puntland government announced the creation of a new region coextensive with Cape Guardafui named Gardafu. Carved out of Bari, it consists of three districts and has its capital at Alula. The new region was officially approved by legislators on July 20, 2013, during the 30th session of the Puntland parliament.

== Education and transportation ==
Alula has a number of academic institutions. According to the Puntland Ministry of Education, there are 11 primary schools in the Alula District. Among these are Xabo, Geesaley, Murcanyo, Xoogad and Alula Primary. Air transportation in Alula is served by the Alula Airport. According to the Somali government, the town has a small seaport.

== Climate ==
Alula has a hot desert climate (Köppen climate classification BWh).

Climate data for Alula
Month	Jan	Feb	Mar	Apr	May	Jun	Jul	Aug	Sep	Oct	Nov	Dec	Year
Record high °C (°F)	31.6 (88.9)	31.0 (87.8)	36.0 (96.8)	37.5 (99.5)	38.3 (100.9)	39.0 (102.2)	40.5 (104.9)	40.0 (104.0)	38.0 (100.4)	36.0 (96.8)	31.6 (88.9)	31.0 (87.8)	40.5 (104.9)
Mean daily maximum °C (°F)	26.9 (80.4)	26.9 (80.4)	29.5 (85.1)	31.9 (89.4)	33.5 (92.3)	34.8 (94.6)	36.0 (96.8)	35.3 (95.5)	33.8 (92.8)	30.8 (87.4)	28.3 (82.9)	27.4 (81.3)	31.4 (88.5)
Daily mean °C (°F)	24.0 (75.2)	23.6 (74.5)	25.5 (77.9)	27.6 (81.7)	28.9 (84.0)	30.2 (86.4)	31.0 (87.8)	30.6 (87.1)	29.2 (84.6)	26.0 (78.8)	24.4 (75.9)	25.4 (77.7)	27.2 (81.0)
Mean daily minimum °C (°F)	21.2 (70.2)	20.5 (68.9)	21.6 (70.9)	23.3 (73.9)	24.5 (76.1)	25.7 (78.3)	26.4 (79.5)	26.0 (78.8)	24.8 (76.6)	21.2 (70.2)	20.6 (69.1)	21.5 (70.7)	23.1 (73.6)
Record low °C (°F)	15.5 (59.9)	15.0 (59.0)	16.0 (60.8)	14.0 (57.2)	16.0 (60.8)	20.0 (68.0)	22.0 (71.6)	21.0 (69.8)	20.0 (68.0)	14.0 (57.2)	15.0 (59.0)	15.0 (59.0)	14.0 (57.2)
Average precipitation mm (inches)	0 (0)	0 (0)	0 (0)	0 (0)	0 (0)	0 (0)	0 (0)	0 (0)	0 (0)	0 (0)	14 (0.6)	1 (0.0)	16 (0.6)
Average precipitation days (≥ 0.1 mm)	0	0	0	0	0	0	0	0	0	0	2	0	3
Average relative humidity (%)	74	72	72	73	71	69	66	70	72	70	74	75	71
Source: Deutscher Wetterdienst

== See also ==
- Qandala
- Habo
