= Bosaso District =

Bosaso
- District
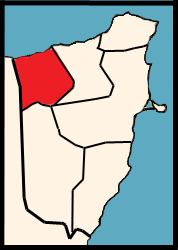
- Coordinates: 11.2833°N 49.1667°E
- Country: Somalia: Puntland
- Region: Bari
- Capital: Bosaso
- Time zone: UTC+3 (EAT)

Bosaso (Somali: Boosaaso) is an administrative division of Somalia, and is the capital of the northeastern Bari region of Somalia. It is also the commercial capital of Puntland state of Somalia and one of Somalia's commercial capitals.
