= Cal Miskaad =

Mountain range in Somalia and Somaliland

Highest point
- Coordinates: 10°47′05.1″N 49°46′05″E

Naming
- Native name: Buuraha Cal Miskaad (Somali); علمسكاد (Arabic)

Geography
- Country: Puntland (Note: As of January 2025, Puntland functions as a de facto independent country.)
- Region: Bari
- Parent range: Ogo Mountains

Cal Miskaad (also Calmiskaad, Al Miskad; Somali: Buuraha Cal Miskaad; Arabic: علمسكاد, romanized: ʿAlamiskad) is a mountain range in Puntland. It stretches across an area between the east of Karin, to the tip of the Horn of Africa. Its peak sits at almost 2,000 m (6,600 ft) on Mount Bahaya, east of Bosaso. Islamic State (IS) has bases in the range, consisting mainly of former Al-Shabaab fighters. Places in Cal Miskaad include Biyo Kulule, Hantaara, Habeeno, Balade, Guri awr, Marraagade, Jidin, Elalo, Buqo Caleed, Daldheer, Mareero, Casaasa,and El Dhurre.

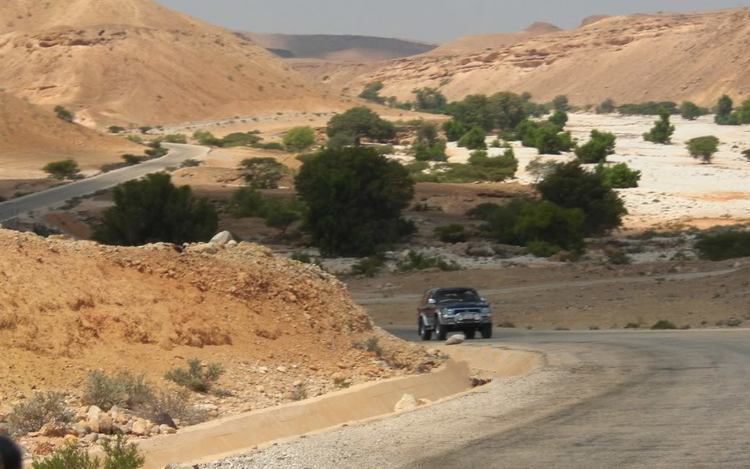
Yalho valley is an instrumental for the separation of Golis ranges of Cal Miskaad and Cal Madow.

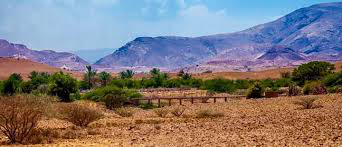
Karin is an interval spot that divides between Mountains of Cal Madow and Cal Miskaad respectively.

== See also ==
- Golis Mountains
