= List of companies of Somalia =

Somalia Somalia with economy of around 12.4 Billion dollars, with total factory and company revenue around 17 Billion dollars.

Somaliland Somaliland is a breakaway region with own army and economy and diplomatic ties and currency, Somaliland GDP is around 7.9 billion Dollars with total factory and company revenue around 10 Billion dollars

Somalia is a country located in the Horn of Africa. It has maintained a healthy informal economy, based mainly on livestock, remittance/Wire transfer money transfer companies and telecommunication With around 12.43 billion dollars GDP and total factory company revenue of Somalia and Somaliland around 20-38 Billion dollars. Somaliland with recognition bid and Meet Montevideo convention is likely to have recognition towards higher levels in the coming years with GDP around 8 billion that totals Somalia and Somaliland GDP to around 24 billion Dollars, Somaliland has new refinery planned in Berbera regions of 30,000bpd capacity by Singapore new silk Somaliland energy company. New Berbera data centre by wingu Africa that serves Ethiopia and Djibouti regions with a projected real growth rate of 3.6%. According to a 2007 British Chambers of Commerce report, the private sector also grew, particularly in the service sector. Unlike the pre-civil war period when most services and the industrial sector were government-run, there has been substantial, albeit unmeasured, private investment in commercial activities; this has been largely financed by the Somali diaspora, and includes trade and marketing, money transfer services, transportation, communications, fishery equipment, airlines, telecommunications, education, health, construction and hotels.

== Notable firms ==
This list includes notable companies with primary headquarters located in the country. The industry and sector follow the Industry Classification Benchmark taxonomy. Organizations which have ceased operations are included and noted as defunct.

Notable companies Status: P=Private, S=State; A=Active, D=Defunct
Name	Industry	Sector	Headquarters	Founded	Notes	Status	
Air Somalia	Consumer services	Airlines	Mogadishu	2001	Private airline	P	A
Bank of Somaliland	Financials	Banks	Hargeisa	1994	Central bank	S	A
Bosaso Tannery	Industrials	Diversified industrials	Bosaso	?	Tannery	P	A
Central Bank of Somalia	Financials	Banks	Mogadishu	1950	Central bank	S	A
Eastern Television Network	Consumer services	Broadcasting & entertainment	Bosaso	2005	Television	P	A
First Somali Bank	Financials	Banks	Mogadishu	2012	Commercial bank	P	A
Golis Telecom Somalia	Telecommunications	Fixed line telecommunications	Bosaso	2002	Telecommunications	P	A
Hafun Fishing Company	Consumer goods	Farming & fishing	Bosaso	1992	Fishing and real estate	P	A
Hargeisa Taxi	Consumer services	Travel & tourism	Hargeisa	2012	Taxi company	P	A
Hormuud Telecom	Telecommunications	Fixed, Voice And Data	Mogadishu	2002	Mobile network	P	A
Horn Cable Television	Consumer services	Broadcasting & entertainment	Hargeisa	2003	Television	P	A
Horyaal	Industrials	Business support services	Bosaso	2008	Design and architecture	P	A
International Bank of Somalia	Financials	Banks	Mogadishu	2014	Commercial bank	P	A
Islamic Insurance Company	Financials	Full line insurance	Mogadishu	2014	Private insurance	P	A
KAAH Electric	Utilities	Conventional electricity	Hargeisa	1997	Private power company	P	A
NationLink Telecom	Telecommunications	Fixed line telecommunications	Mogadishu	1997	Telecommunications, ISP	P	A
Netco	Telecommunications	Fixed line telecommunications	Bosaso	1993	Telecommunications, part of Somali Telecom Group	P	A
Puntland Post	Consumer services	Publishing	Garoowe	2001	News organization	P	A
Puntland TV and Radio (PLTV)	Consumer services	Broadcasting & entertainment	Garowe	2013	Television	S	A
Radio Gaalkacyo	Consumer services	Broadcasting & entertainment	Galkayo	1993	Radio station	P	A
Radio Mogadishu	Consumer services	Broadcasting & entertainment	Mogadishu	1943	State radio	S	A
Salaam Bank	Financials	Banks	Bosaso	2011	Commercial bank	P	A
Salaam Somali Bank	Financials	Banks	Mogadishu	2009	Commercial bank	P	A
Shabelle Media Network	Consumer services	Publishing	Mogadishu	2002	News organization	P	A
Somafone	Telecommunications	Fixed line telecommunications	Mogadishu	2003	Telecommunications	P	A
Somali Airlines	Consumer services	Airlines	Mogadishu	1964	Airline, defunct 1991	P	D
Somali Broadcasting Corporation	Consumer services	Broadcasting & entertainment	Bosaso	2001	Broadcaster	P	A
Somali Energy Company	Utilities	Conventional electricity	Mogadishu	?	Power company	P	A
Somali National Television (SNTV)	Consumer services	Broadcasting & entertainment	Mogadishu	1983	Television	S	A
Somaliland Beverage Industries	Industrials	Beverages	Hargeisa	2010	Fizzy drinks, Mineral water and Dairy	P	A
Somaliland National TV (SLNTV)	Consumer services	Broadcasting & entertainment	Hargeisa	2004	Television	S	A
Somalia Petroleum Corporation	Oil & gas	Exploration & production	Mogadishu	2007	Oil and gas exploration	S	A
Somali Postal Service	Industrials	Delivery services	Mogadishu	1991	Postal services	S	A
SomCable	Telecommunications	Internet Service Provider	Hargeisa	2010	Telecommunications	P	A
Sompower	Utilities	Conventional electricity	Hargeisa	2016	Power company	P	A
Somtel	Telecommunications	Fixed line telecommunications	Hargeisa	1993	Telecommunications	P	A
Telcom	Telecommunications	Fixed line telecommunications	Mogadishu	1997	Telecommunications	P	A
Telesom	Telecommunications	Fixed line telecommunications	Hargeisa	2002	Telecommunications	P	A
Trans-National Industrial Electricity and Gas Company	Utilities	Conventional electricity	Mogadishu	2010	Power company	P	A

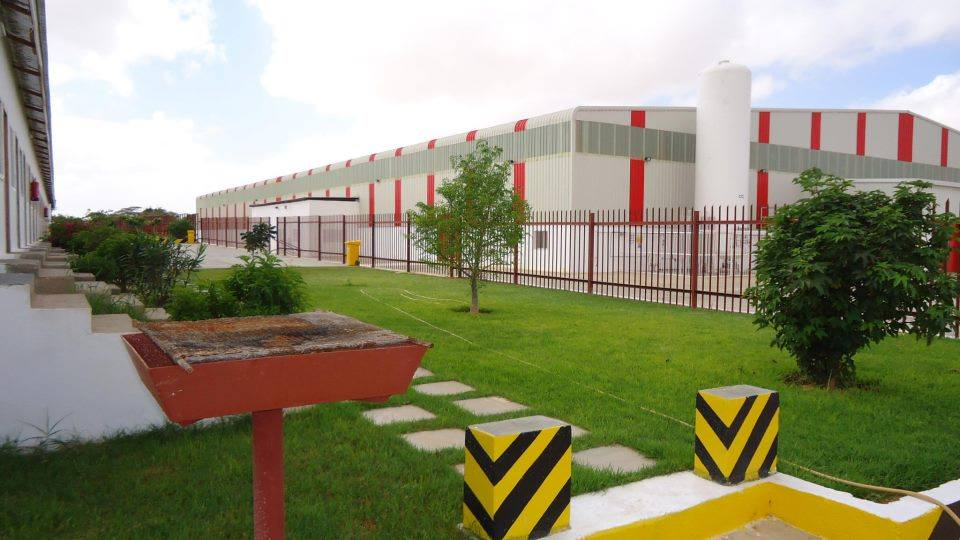

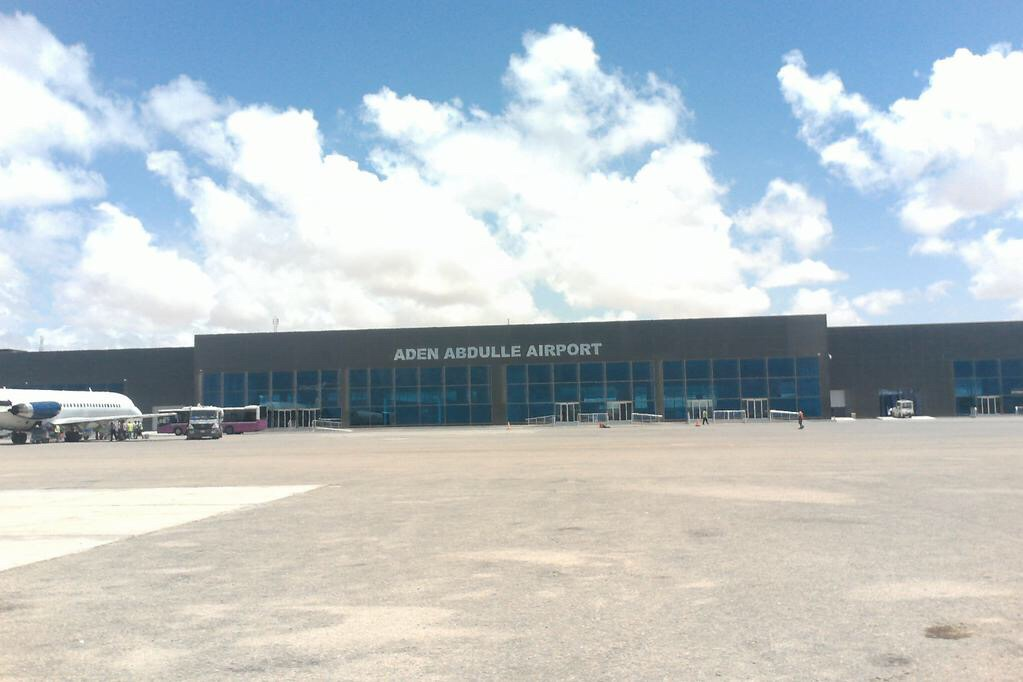

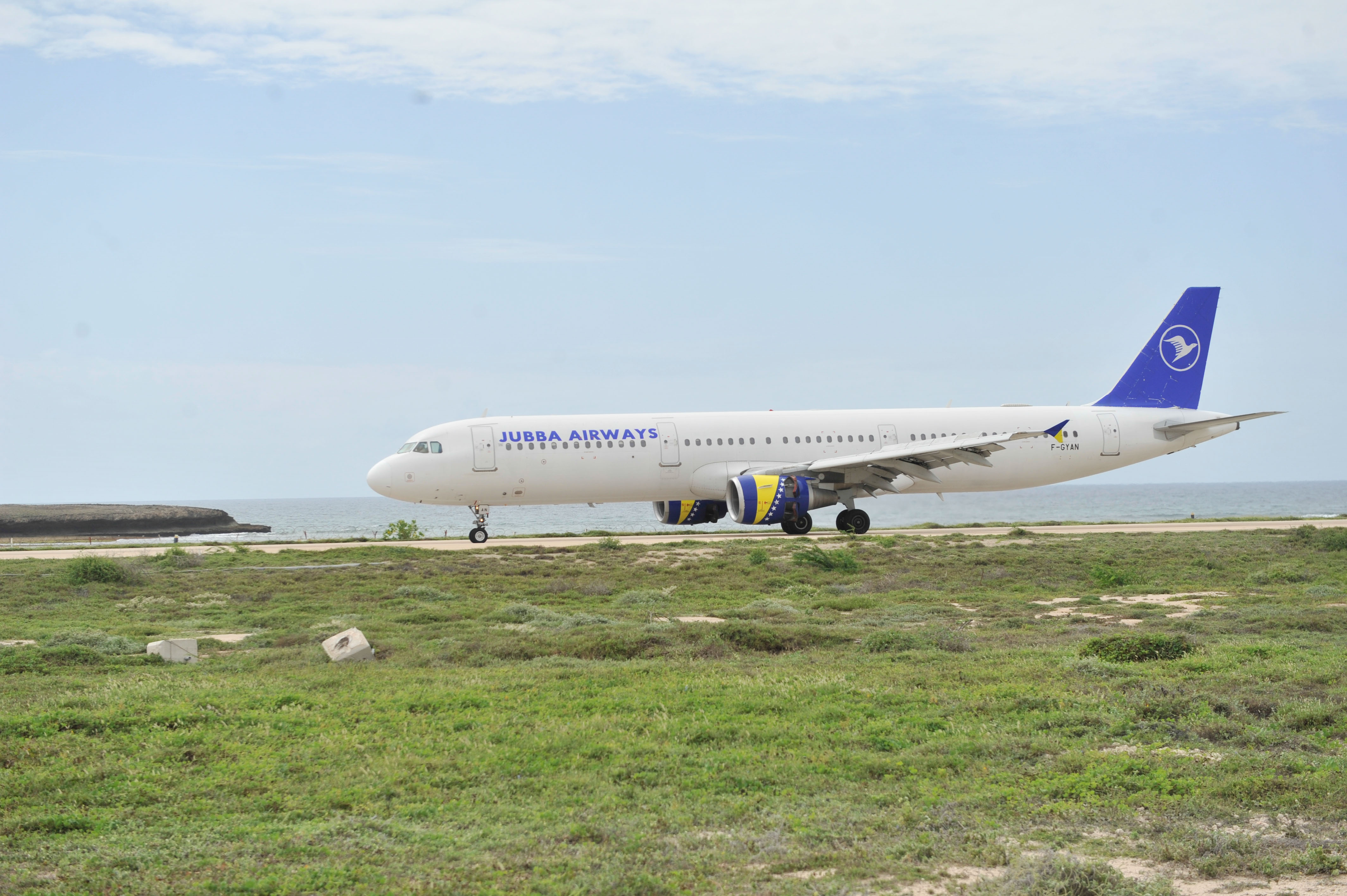
