= Sompower =

Electric utility company in Somaliland

- Company type: Private enterprise
- Industry: Electric utility
- Founded: April 2016; 10 years ago
- Headquarters: Hargeisa, Somaliland
- Area served: Somaliland
- Key people: Ismael Bershiya (Chairman)
- Products: Electrical grid, Electric power transmission
- Number of employees: 1000
- Website: Official Website

The Sompower is a private electric utility company based in Hargeisa, Somaliland. It specialises generating, transmitting and distributing of the electric power. Founded in 2016 by the merger of 39 local utility firms. It is one of the largest utility companies in Somaliland.

== Power stations in Somaliland ==
- Hargeisa Diesel fuel power station 25MW
- Hargeisa solar Power Station 20MW

== See also ==
- List of companies of Somaliland
- KAAH Electric
- Somali Energy Company
