= Hafun Fishing Company =

Somali fishing company

- Company type: Private
- Industry: fishing, real estate
- Founded: 1992
- Headquarters: Bosaso, Puntland
- Key people: Mohamed Abshir Abdi (Chairman)
- Products: lobsters, frozen fish, dried shark meat and shrimp
- Website: hafunfishing

The Hafun Fishing Company (HFC) is a fishing and real estate firm headquartered in Bosaso, the commercial capital of the state of Puntland in northern Somalia

== Holdings ==
=== Fishing ===
The Hafun Fishing Company was established in July 1992 in Bosaso. It was named after the northeastern port town of Hafun, where HFC also has an office.

The firm exported a wide range of fish products to international markets. Among these were lobsters, frozen fish, dried shark meat and shrimp which it mainly sent to Yemen, the United Arab Emirates and Oman in the Persian Gulf, as well as some products to Kenya and Uganda. The company is also exploring additional global markets for its fish goods.

=== Real estate ===
Besides the fishing industry, HFC maintains business activities in Puntland's housing market. These commercial interests are represented by the firm's growing local real estate sales and development division.

== Management ==
The Hafun Fishing Company is chaired by its founder, Mohamed Abshir Abdi. Said Farah Mohamoud served as the firm's Managing Director at its main Bosaso office.

Additionally, Omar K. Yusuf is the Chief Integrity Controller of HFC's London branch.

== See also ==
- Bosaso Tannery
- List of companies of Somalia
