= Hantaara =

Somali bay

Coordinates: 11°26′47.1″N 49°33′11.8″E

Hantaara, Hantara, Gacanka Hantaara, or Hantara Bay (Arabic: خليج هنتارا or هنتارا) is a coastal habitat in the Bari region of Somalia that is believed to be one of the largest natural harbours in the country. Hantaara also belongs to a sizeable bay; there are date farms and a wider range of mountainous grassland including the Hantaara plateau. It lies about 60 kilometres (37 mi) east of Bosaso. It is behind the towns of Bur Gaban and Bacaad. The area has mineral and coal deposits, and is abundant in frankincense trees and myrrh trees.
