= Mount Bahaya =

Mountain in Somalia

- Location within Somalia

Highest point
- Elevation: 2,107 m (6,913 ft)
- Prominence: 1,585 m (5,200 ft)
- Isolation: 281 km (175 mi)
- Listing: only Ultra-prominent peak in Somalia
- Coordinates: 11°19.57′N 49°44.91′E

Naming
- Native name: Buurta Baxaya (Somali)

Geography
- Parent range: Fadhisame Mountains

Mount Bahaya (Somali: Buurta Baxaya, sometimes spelled Mount Bahaja) is the fourth-tallest mountain in Somalia, after the triple-peaked mountains Mount Shimbiris, Mount Surud Cad, and Mount Warraq. It is the only Ultra-prominent peak in the country with a summit of about 2,100 m (6,900 ft). It is located in the northern Bari region, 60 kilometres (37 mi) east of Bosaso, close to the Red Sea. The exact elevation is uncertain, being either 2,065 m (6,775 ft), 2,084 m (6,837 ft), or 2,120 m (6,960 ft). According to a map from the Defense Mapping Agency published in 1974, it could even be 2,135 m (7,005 ft) in height.

With a prominence of 1,543 to 1,613 meters, it is an Ultra-prominent peak, making it the 74th to 58th most prominent peak in Africa, and the only definite one in the country of Somalia. The taller Mount Shimbiris could be an Ultra-prominent peak as well, with a measured prominence of 1,495 m (4,905 ft). The mountain is highly elongated in a northwest-southeast direction, leading some to list the southern and northern ends as Bahaya and Karkoor, respectively.

Mount Bahaya is the tallest peak in the Fadhisame Mountains, which are in northeastern Somalia. The range itself is a small section of the larger Cal Miskaad Mountains, which define the northern Horn of Africa in most of Somalia, and which extend from Karin to further east, their peaks forming the Socotra Archipelago. Bahaya, along with the surrounding range, is mostly made up of the deeply-eroded remnants of an ancient volcanic chain.
