= Habeeno =

Naming
- Native name: Buuraha Habeeno (Somali); هابينو (Arabic)

Geography
- Parent range: Cal Miskaad

Geology
- Mountain type: Subrange

Climbing
- Easiest route: Dabahaya

Buuraha Habeeno (also Habeeno, Habeno) is a mountain in the Cal Miskaad mountain range, Somalia.

== See also ==
- Mount Bahaya
- Fadhisame
