= Gacayte Hotel =

Hotel in Somalia

Coordinates: 11°16′32″N 49°11′16″E

- Interactive map of the Gacayte Hotel area
- Former names: The Grand Hotel

General information
- Architectural style: Baroque
- Location: Hafatul Arab area N, Bosaso, Somalia
- Construction started: 1963
- Completed: 1966
- Inaugurated: 1966
- Renovated: 2014

Height
- Height: 37 m (121 ft)

Other information
- Number of rooms: 413

Website
- http://www.gaaytepeak.com

The Gacayte Hotel is a large seaside hotel in Bosaso, Somalia, overlooking the town's northwest side. At the time of its grand opening in 1966, it was the largest hotel and the largest brick structure in northeastern Somalia. After the collapse of the Somali central government, the hotel doors were gradually closed due to a countrywide economic recession and lack of government operations because hotel clients mostly were state officials and other high/middle income Somali citizens.

== Reopening ==
In 2014, the hotel was renovated, modernized and scheduled to be opened by Puntland president Abdiweli Mohamed Ali. However, in the absence of the president, a bunch of ministers took the president's place and officially reopened the hotel, other guests including businessmen, elders, guests and other prominent individuals witnessed the reopen event. However, the president did manage to return to Bosaso a years later and stayed in the hotel.
