= Somalia Petroleum Corporation =

- Company type: Government-owned firm
- Industry: Oil & gas
- Headquarters: Mogadishu, Somalia
- Key people: Hussein Ali Ahmed (Managing Director); Patrick Mollière, Head of Aldric Global of Singapore (advisor); J. Jay Park, Norton Rose Canada (advisor)
- Products: petroleum
- Owner: Federal Government of Somalia

The Somalia Petroleum Corporation (SPC), also known as the Somalia Petroleum Company, is a hydrocarbon exploration and production firm based in Mogadishu, Somalia. It was established in 2007, following the passing of the Somalia Petroleum Law by the Transitional Federal Government. The Somalia Petroleum Corporation is owned by the Federal Government of Somalia, and falls under the authority of the national Ministry of Natural Resources.

== See also ==
- List of companies of Somalia
