= Hargeisa Taxi =

Taxi company in Somaliland

Hargeisa Taxi is a taxi company based in Hargeisa, the capital of Somaliland. Established in 2012, it has a fleet of four small compact cars and seven passenger minivans, in addition to around 19 other vehicles. GPS devices installed by the Sahal Technology firm allow the cab company's dispatch office to monitor its taxis to ensure that they travel within the speed limit. The office can also disable the vehicles online in the event of theft.

== See also ==
- List of companies of Somaliland
- Transportation in Somaliland
