= Bur Gaban =

Town in Bari, Somalia

- Town
- Location in Somalia.
- Coordinates: 11°21′41″N 49°28′9″E
- Country: Somalia; Puntland
- Region: Bari
- District: Bosaso District
- Time zone: UTC+3 (EAT)

Bur Gaban or Buur Gaaban is a coastal town in the northeastern Bari region of Somalia. The town lies 47 kilometres (29 mi) east of Bosaso, neighboring Bacaad.
