= Bacaad =

- Town
- Location in Somalia.
- Coordinates: 11°21′04″N 49°26′56.3″E
- Country: Somalia: Puntland
- Region: Bari
- Time zone: UTC+3 (EAT)

Bacaad, Bender Ba'ad, Bender Bacaad is a coastal town in the northeastern Bari region of Somalia. It is 45 kilometres (28 mi) east of Bosaso, adjacent to Bur gaban. The two towns are considered twins and have the same harbour, Deketul Rahman. Both Bacaad and Bur Gaban are inhabited by Dishiishe clan.
