= Hassan Abdallah Hassan =

Somali politician

Hassan Abdallah Hassan حسن عبد الله حسن

Mayor of Bosaso
- In office September 2011 – September 2014
- Succeeded by: Yasin Mire Mohamud

Hassan Abdallah Hassan (Somali: Xasan Cabdale Xasan, Arabic: حسن عبد الله حسن) is a Somali politician. He is the former Mayor of Bosaso, the commercial capital of the autonomous Puntland region in northeastern Somalia. In 2011, the city's District Council unanimously voted to elect Hassan to office. He was previously the Deputy Finance Minister of Puntland.

Acting mayor

On September 15, 2022 Hassan was nominated as the acting mayor of Bosaso, marking his second time at the mayoral office. Prior, he was serving as the Puntland Deputy Minister of Planning and International Cooperation.

== Early life ==
He belongs Dishiishe clan of Darod groups.
