= Mareero =

Mareero Beach Xeebta Mareero
- Beach
- Xeebta Mareero
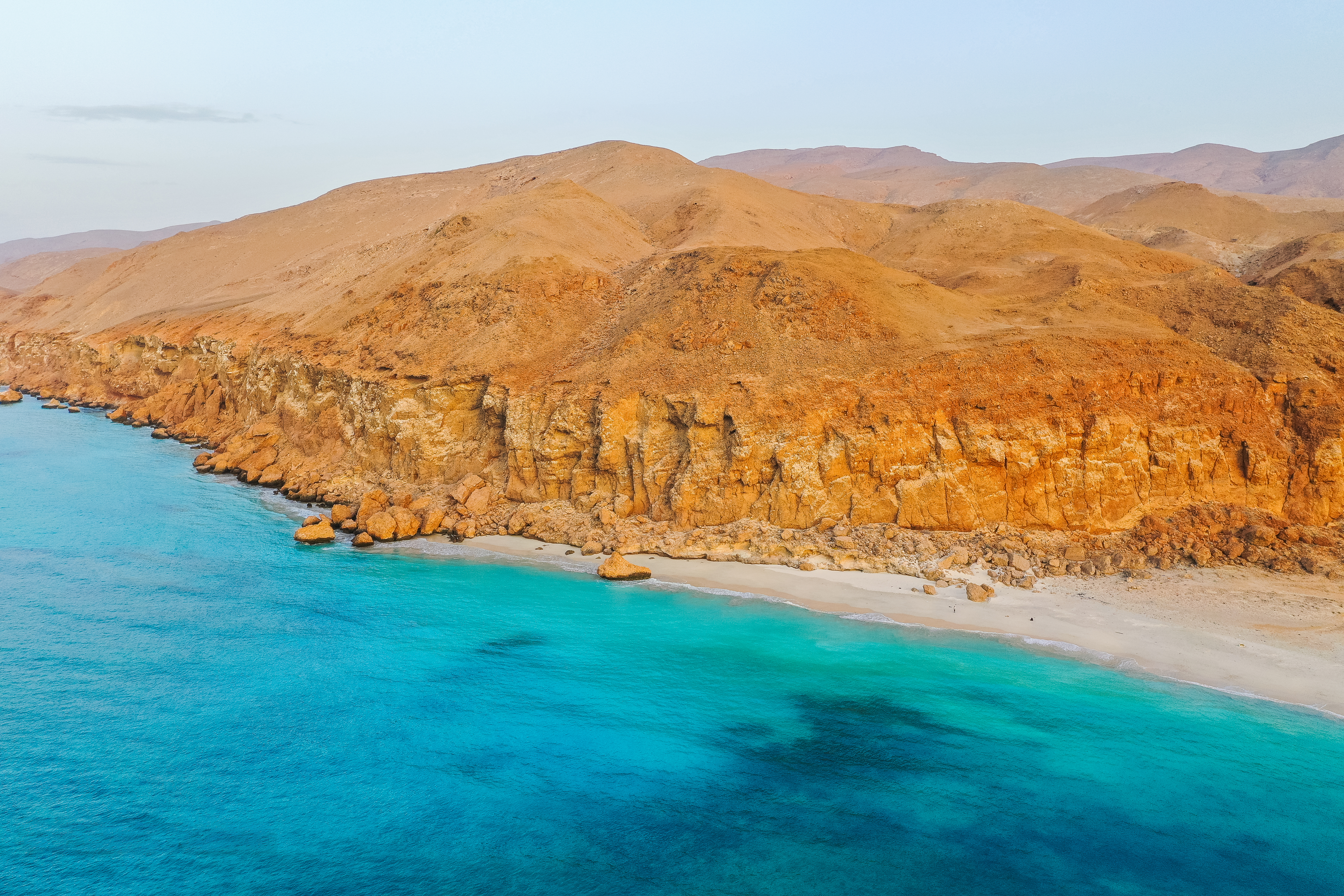

- Location within Somalia
- Coordinates: 11°19′47″N 49°17′48″E
- Somalia: Puntland: Region
- Time zone: UTC+3 (EAT)

Mareero Beach, Xeebta Marero is a beach located (25 kilometres (16 mi) east of Bosaso. It possesses coastal habitat, frankincense and other myrrh groups growing plateau, grazing areas, sizeable beach and most importantly the mareero natural harbour, which is deep enough to provide anchorage. The mareero harbour became an illegal immigration route between Somalia and Yemen and the Arab peninsula generally since the collapse of the Somali central government in early 1991. The harbour was formerly used by Somali business communities for export and import of goods for centuries. According to reports, boats carrying arms smuggled from Yemen have been docked at the Marero harbour.

Mareero beach is popular for its sizeable beach, where visitors and tourists have been flocking in recent years.

== History ==
On January 23, 2025, At least 140 dolphins were stranded on the shores of Mareero near Bosaso, Puntland, reports revealed some dolphins were alive when they washed ashore, but over 60 were confirmed dead. Authorities, including the Puntland Ministries of Environment and Fisheries, managed to return 30 dolphins to the sea. Despite claims of toxic waste dumping in Somali waters, scientific teams have collected fluid, tissue, water, and soil samples for analysis. While no other marine species were found dead along the beach, the investigation continues to uncover the cause. Officials, including the minister of fisheries, visited the site alongside experts from universities and marine institutes.
