= Abdisalam Bashiir Abdisalam =

Somali Swedish politician

Abdisalam Bashir Abdisalam

Mayor of Bosaso
- In office 6 September 2021 – incumbent
- Preceded by: Abdisalam Bashiir Abdisalam
- Succeeded by: Dr Abdiqani

Personal details
- Born: 1989 (age 36–37) Bosaso

Abdisalam Bashiir Abdisalam (Somali: Cabdisalaan Bashiir Cabdisalaan, Arabic: عبدالسلام بشير عبدالسلام) is a Somali Swedish politician. He is the incumbent Mayor of Bosaso, the commercial and cultural capital of the autonomous Puntland region in northeastern Somalia. On September 6, 2018, District local Council unanimously voted in the favour of Abdisalam to lead the city over five years ahead. He previously was Mayor of Waiye District, Puntland. He hails from the Dishiishe sub-clan of the Darod.

Political offices
Preceded by Yasin Mire Mohamud	Mayor of Bosaso; 2018–present	Incumbent
