= Balade (Somalia) =

Wadi in Northern Somalia

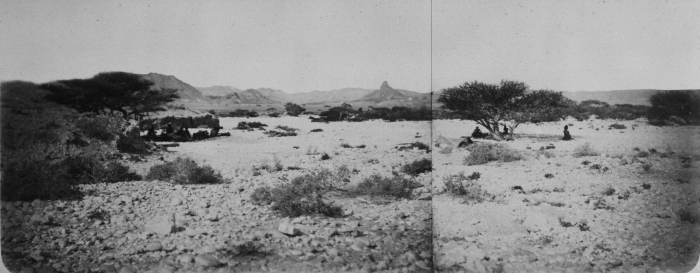
- c. 1881
- Long-axis direction: Roughly East - West

Naming
- Native name: بلدى (Arabic)

Geography
- Coordinates: The mouth of the wadi is here: 11°17′3.88″N 49°9′40.46″E
- Interactive map of Balade

Balade (Somali: Togga Baalade, Arabic: بلدى), also called Balada or Uadi Balade is a wadi (Tog or الوادي) that has carved a long valley through the mountains of the Bari Region in Northern Somalia. Its sources start in the Cal Miskaad mountains and the wadi ends up into the Gulf of Aden near the western outskirts of Bosaso town, capital of the Bari Region. The lower part of the valley supports a variety grazing methods and seasonal vegetable firms.

A number of poems refer to the valley, these poems reflect valley significances in particularly its bulk and perennial supply of water. One the poems reads "Baalade Biyaa laga Helloo lagu barwaaqoowye". That meant "Baalade owns ever flowing water streams".

== Balade's role in the Economy ==
The valley's grass firms host tens of thousands of commercial livestock all summer times each year. At that time, shipping companies suspend exporting and importing of all commodities due to the adverse weather such as severe winds and strong waves that is unfavoring maritime transportations to have their normal work, during that time it is locally known as Bad-xiran, and livestock dealers rush to rent grass firms for grazing and sustaining livestock betterment.

These commercial grass firms play critical role in sustaining animal health and to be fit enough for commercial purposes.
