= Yasin Mire Mohamud =

Somali Politician & Former Mayor of Bosaso

Yasin Mire Mohamud ياسين ميري محمود

Mayor of Bosaso
- In office September 2014 – August 2018
- Preceded by: Hassan Abdallah Hassan
- Succeeded by: Abdisalam Bashiir Abdisalam

Yasin Mire Mohamud (Somali: Yaasiin Mire Maxamuud, Arabic: ياسين ميري محمود) is a Somali politician. He was mayor of Bosaso from 2015 to 2018, the commercial capital and biggest of the autonomous Puntland region in northeastern Somalia, after the city's District Council unanimously voted for him in 2014. He also in charge in other offices.

On August 10, 2016, Mayor Yasin Mire underlined a sisterhood relationship agreement with Mayor Betsy Hodges of Minneapolis USA, the relationship was originally approved by Minneapolis city council and later embraced by Bosaso local council. Minneapolis and Bosaso city officials have formally signed a sister-city relationship agreement that formalizes their respective cities relationship as sister cities. Minneapolis partnered with Bosaso, Somalia, in 2014 to strengthen relationships abroad and with the large Somali population there in Minnesota. A signing made that relationship official. Minneapolis is the first city in the United States with a sister city in Somalia. On August 12, 2016, Bosaso Mayor Yasin Mire Mohamud was in Minneapolis and toured Hennepin County Medical Center, visiting the hospital's Simulation Center, Center for Hyperbaric Medicine, Interpreter Services Department and Medicine Clinic.

The sister-city signing ceremony took place on August 10, 2016, at Minneapolis City Hall.

== Biography ==
Mire was born and raised in Bosaso. He attended university in Malaysia where he earned a degree in social science. He hails from the Dishiishe clan.

Political offices
Preceded by Hassan Abdallah Hassan	Mayor of Bosaso; 2015-2018	Succeeded by Abdisalam Bashiir Abdisalam
