= Horyaal =

Puntland architectural firm

Horyaal Group
- Company type: Private
- Industry: Design
- Founded: 2008
- Founder: Said Sheik-Abdi
- Headquarters: Bosaso, Puntland

Horyaal or Horyaal Group is a Puntland architectural firm that specialises in decoration and renovation of interiors and exterior structures. The term horyaal refers to exemplarity. In 2017 it was nominated for Somali business of the year by International Somali Awards. It is currently engaged in various projects including in Awdal, Puntland and Djibouti and their portfolio includes the construction of petrol stations and hotels. Horyaal also sponsors social events.
