= Biyo Kulule =

Somalia nature area

Biyo Kulule, also known as Bio Culul (Italian: Bio Culul) is a hot spring located southeast of Bosaso in Puntland, Somalia. It is 7 kilometres (4.3 mi) drive away from the city. The settlement contains several areas, including palm tree farms and grassland. It is one of the tourist hubs in Somalia and prioritized tourism spot within Bosaso and its surroundings.

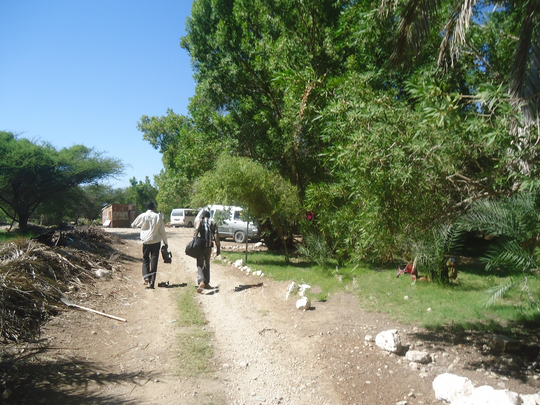
Visitors at Biyo kulule

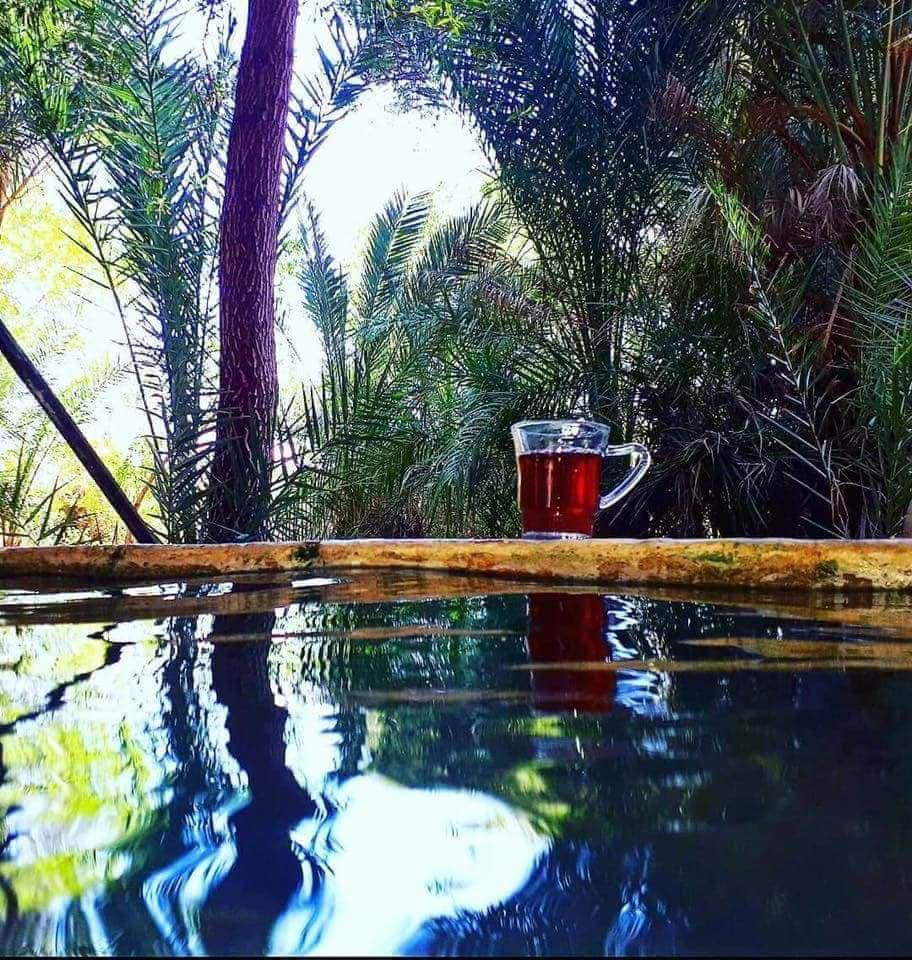
Natural spring
