= List of castles, palaces and fortifications in Somalia =

This a list of castles, palaces and fortifications in Somalia.

Castle or Fortification	Location	Date	Image
Citadel of Gondershe	South West State	15th century	
Eyl	Puntland		
Dhulbahante Garesa	North East State	20th century	
Ancient town of Qandala	Puntland	13th century	
Ras Bar Balla	Jubaland		
Jidali fort	Puntland	20th century	
Siyara	Somaliland		
Villa Somalia	Mogadishu	20th century	

== See also ==
- List of palaces
- List of castles in Africa
- List of castles
- List of forts
