= Bosaso Tannery =

- Type: Private
- Industry: livestock
- Founded: 2000s
- Headquarters: Bosaso, Puntland
- Key people: Mohamed Dirye Hussein
- Products: Wet Blue and Pickle Goat and Sheep skins, and camel hides.
- Number of employees: 250+

Bosaso Tannery is a tannery headquartered in Bosaso, the commercial capital of the autonomous state of Puntland.

== Services and manufacturing ==
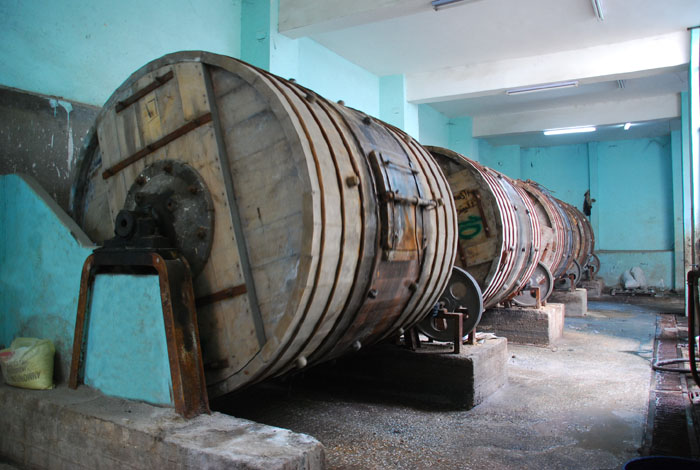
Machines at a Bosaso Tannery workshop.

A ten-year-old manufacturing, distributing, wholesale and import/export company, the Bosaso Tannery processes wet salted, dry salted, wet blue, limed, pickled, and air/frame dried sheep and goat hides and skin. It has some of the highest quality natural skins on the continent.

Bosaso Tannery processes two kinds of hides and skins: wet blue and pickle. Natural chemicals are used in the production of the pickled variety.

The hides and skins are graded on a one to six scale. Lowest quality products are tiered according to a single (R), double (RR) or triple reject system (RRR).

In total, daily turnover is 5,000 individual skins and 300 camel hides.

As of 2012, the company is moving toward ready-made leather production for eventual exportation to consumer markets in the Middle East and other areas.

== Exports and distribution ==
Bosaso Tannery ships its goods from Bosaso to the Middle East, which takes about seven days to arrive in Dubai. From there, manufactured hides and skins are sent to importing countries.

A little over 90,000 tonnes of hides and skins are exported every year to Ethiopia, Turkey, Pakistan, India, China and Italy. Raw camel hides and sheep and goat skin are also dispatched to the United Arab Emirates.

The wet blue type is exported to the Middle East and various parts of Europe. In Spain and Germany, the pickled type is sent to meet the high demand.

== Management and branches ==
The Bosaso Tannery is a joint venture firm, which is owned by local traders. With a staff of upwards of 1,000 workers, it has 106 branches throughout the Puntland region.

The company is managed by Director General Mohamed Dirye Hussein. He is also a majority shareholder in the firm.

== See also ==
- List of companies of Somalia
