= El Dhurre =

Populated place

Coordinates: 11°09′N 49°29′E

El Dhurre is a populated place in Bari Region, Somalia located 36 kilometres (22 mi) southeast of Bosaso.
