= Islamic Insurance Company =

- Company type: Private
- Industry: insurance
- Founded: 2014
- Headquarters: Mogadishu, Somalia
- Key people: Mohamed Abdi Mohamed (General Director)

The Islamic Insurance Company, also known as the FISO-TAKAFUL, is a private insurance firm based in Mogadishu, Somalia.

== Overview ==
The Islamic Insurance Company was founded in December 2014. It is the first full service insurance firm to be established in Somalia in over 20 years.

The company offers life, vehicle and property insurance to local businesses and individuals, in accordance with Islamic insurance tenets (takaful). It also aims to provide Sharia-compliant insurance products throughout the nation and globally.

Additionally, the firm is partnered with a number of international insurance companies.

== See also ==
- Dahabshil Bank International
