= Somali Energy Company =

Private energy firm in Mogadishu Somalia

- Company type: Energy firm
- Industry: electric power
- Founded: 2010
- Headquarters: Mogadishu, Somalia
- Products: electricity generation, transmission and distribution
- Website: www.somenergy.com

Somali Energy Company (SECO) is a private energy firm based in Mogadishu, Somalia. It specializes in the generation, transmission and distribution of electric power to residents and businesses within its service area in the south-central Banaadir region. The largest such energy company in the nation, it also engages in technical innovation of power systems, environmental technology and transmission systems.

== See also ==
- Somali Chamber of Commerce and Industry
