= Karin, Bari =

Karin Deegaanka Karin
- Town
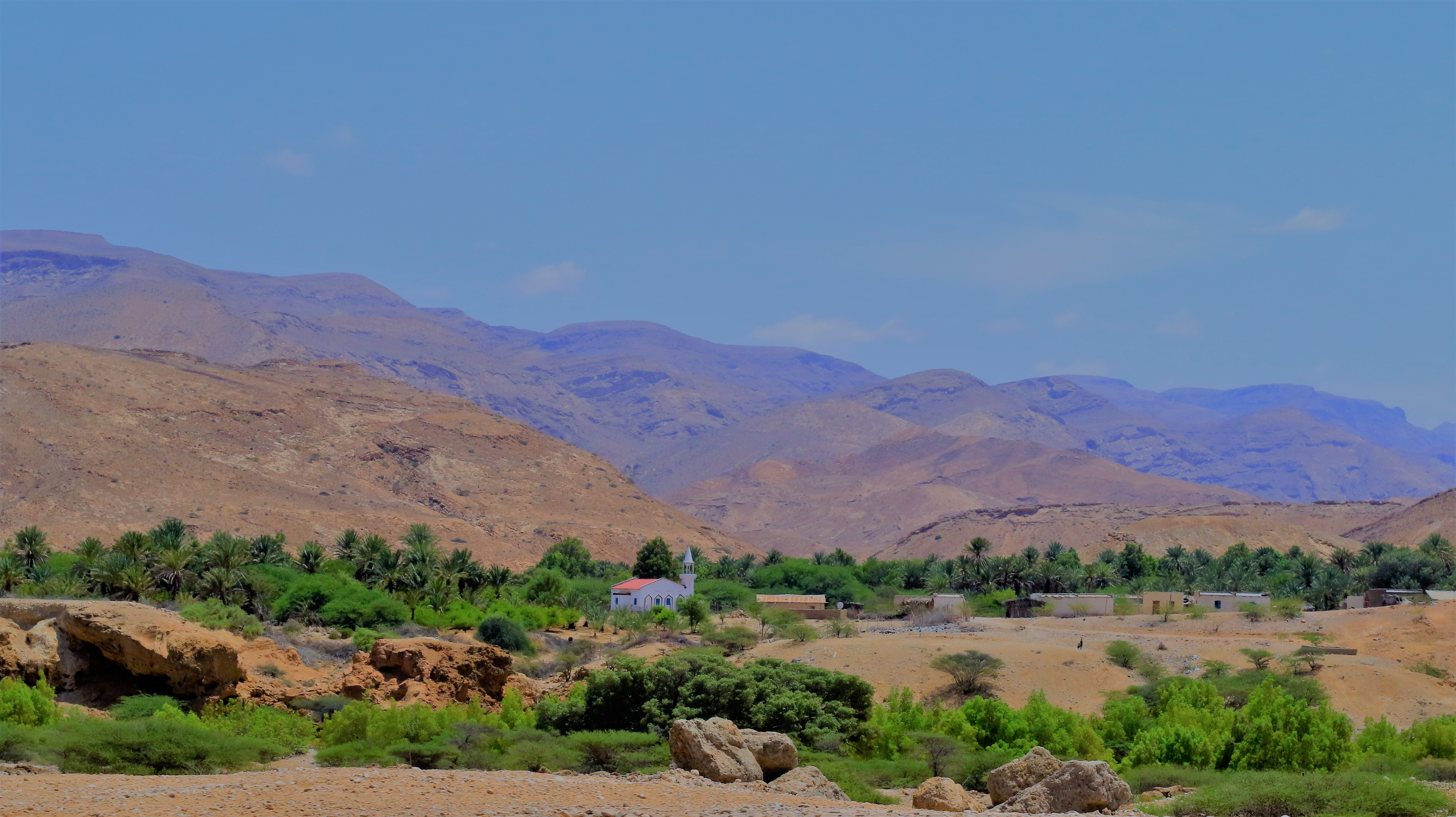
- Karin in 2022

- Location within Somalia
- Coordinates: 11°1′25″N 49°11′52″E
- Country: Somalia
- Regional State: Puntland
- Region: Bari, Somalia
- District: Bosaso District
- Time zone: UTC+3 (EAT)

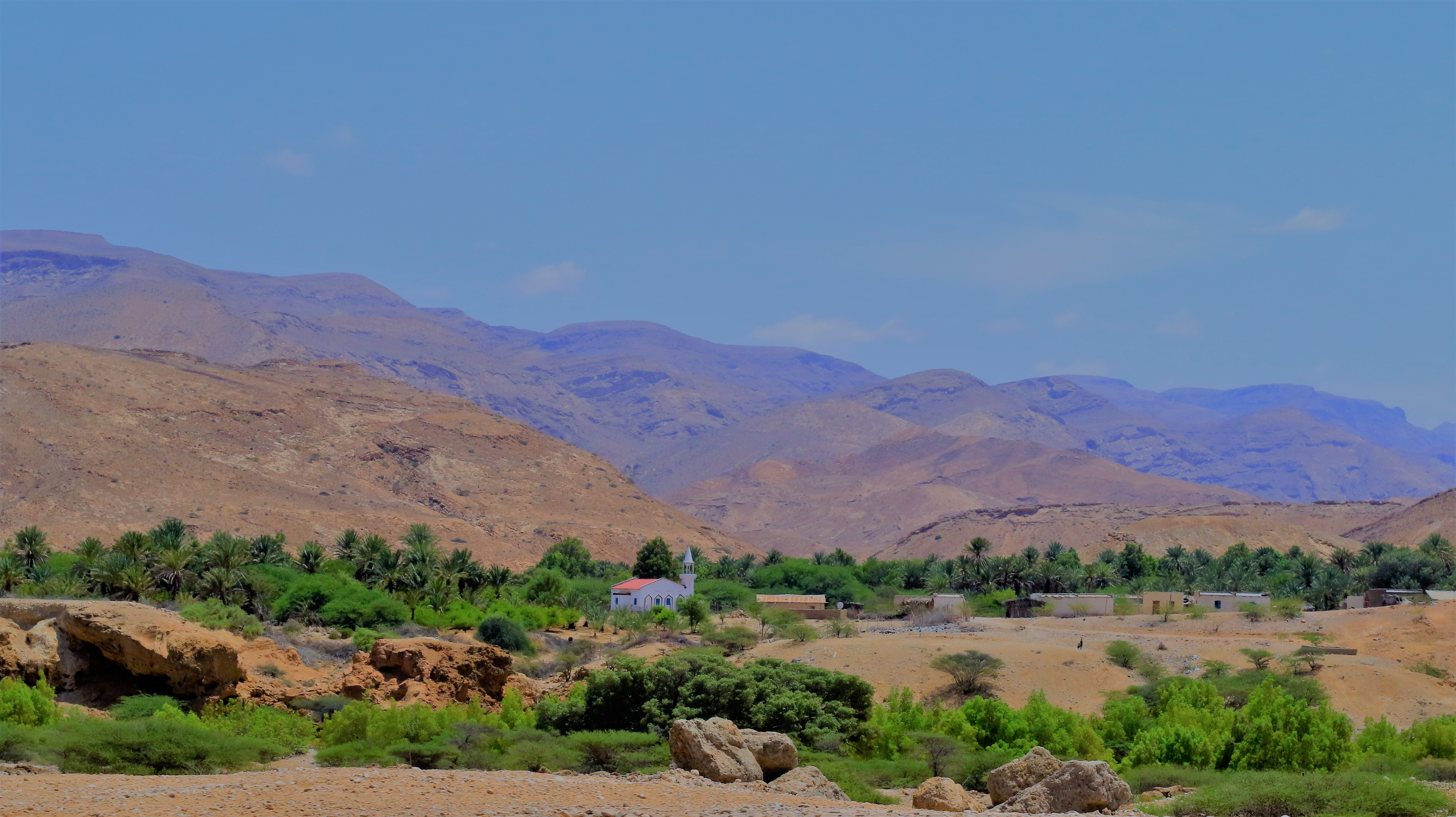

Karin is an ancient town in Bari region in Puntland, Somalia. Situated 40 kilometres (25 mi) south of Bosaso on the Bari highway, the town administratively falls under the Bosaso municipality. It is famous for dates and fruit farms.
