= KAAH Electric =

Company of Somailand

- Type: Private
- Headquarters: Hargeisa, Somaliland
- Website: kaahelectric.com

Kaah Electric Power and Lighting Company (KEPLC) is the largest power company in Somalia. It owns and operates the entire electricity distribution system in most popular cities and towns in the country, and provides electricity to customers.

== Overview ==
KEPLC was established in 1997 in Hargeisa as the City Light Electric Company (CLEC). It changed its name to the Kaah Electric Power and Lighting Company Ltd in 2006. Before major power sector rehabilitation in 2009, KEPLC also managed all pre-existing generating stations, which were owned by private generator suppliers in Somaliland.

The majority shareholders in KEPLC are the pre-existing generator companies in Hargeisa, while the remaining shares in the company are owned by private shareholders.

== Operations ==
The company's key operations include ensuring sufficient distribution capacity to meet demand, planning, design, construction and maintenance of the electricity distribution network and customer service.

== Service area ==
- Hargeisa
- Burao
- Erigavo
