= Bosaso =

City in Bari, Puntland

Bosaso Boosaaso بوصاصو
- City
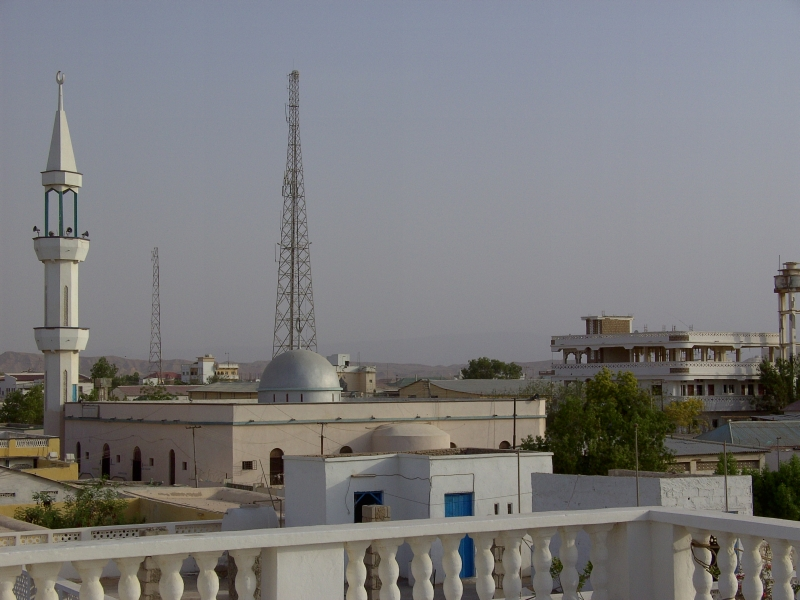
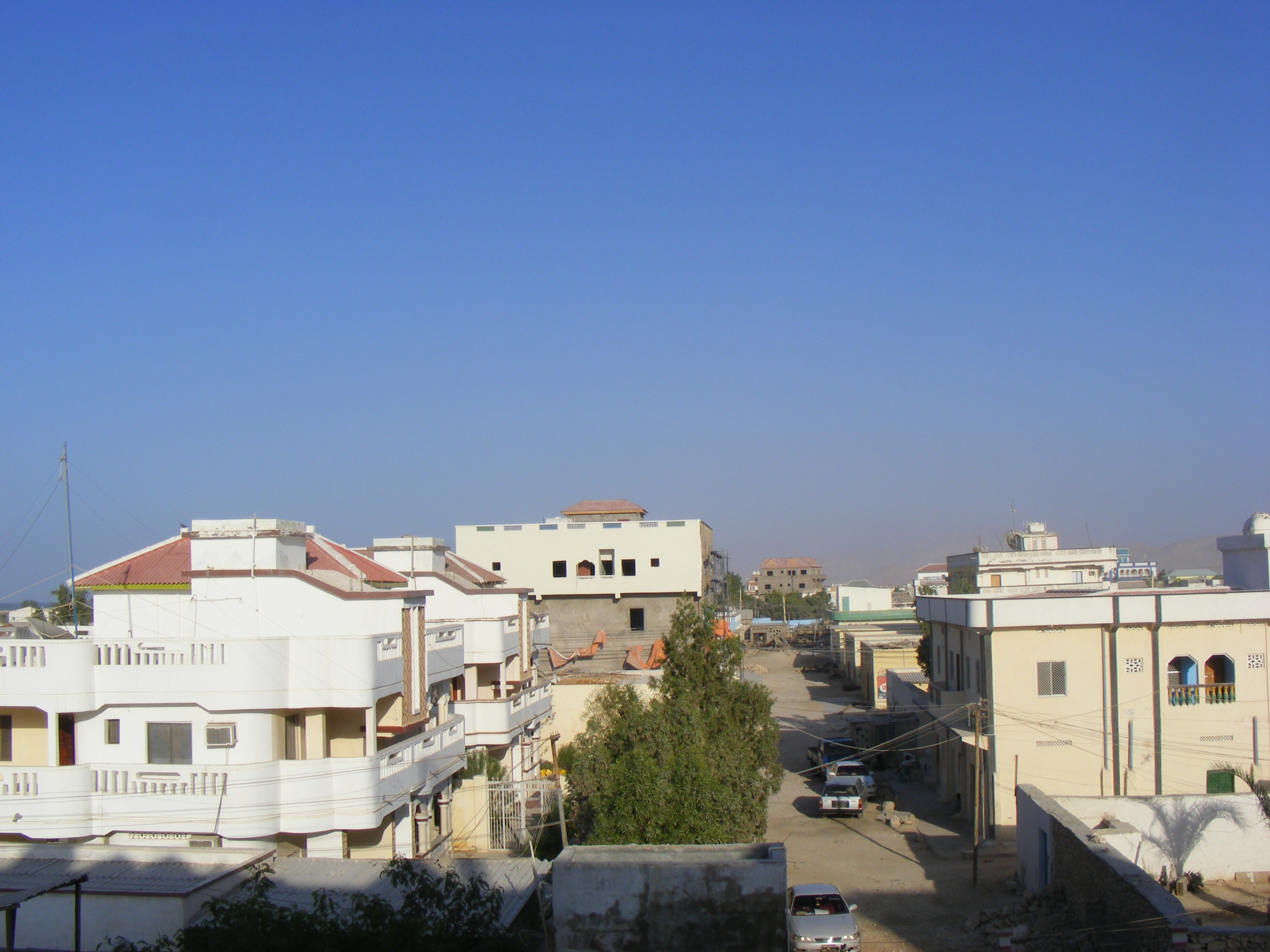
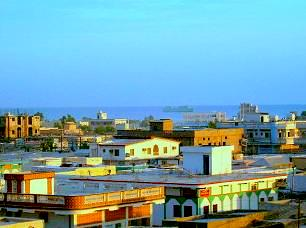
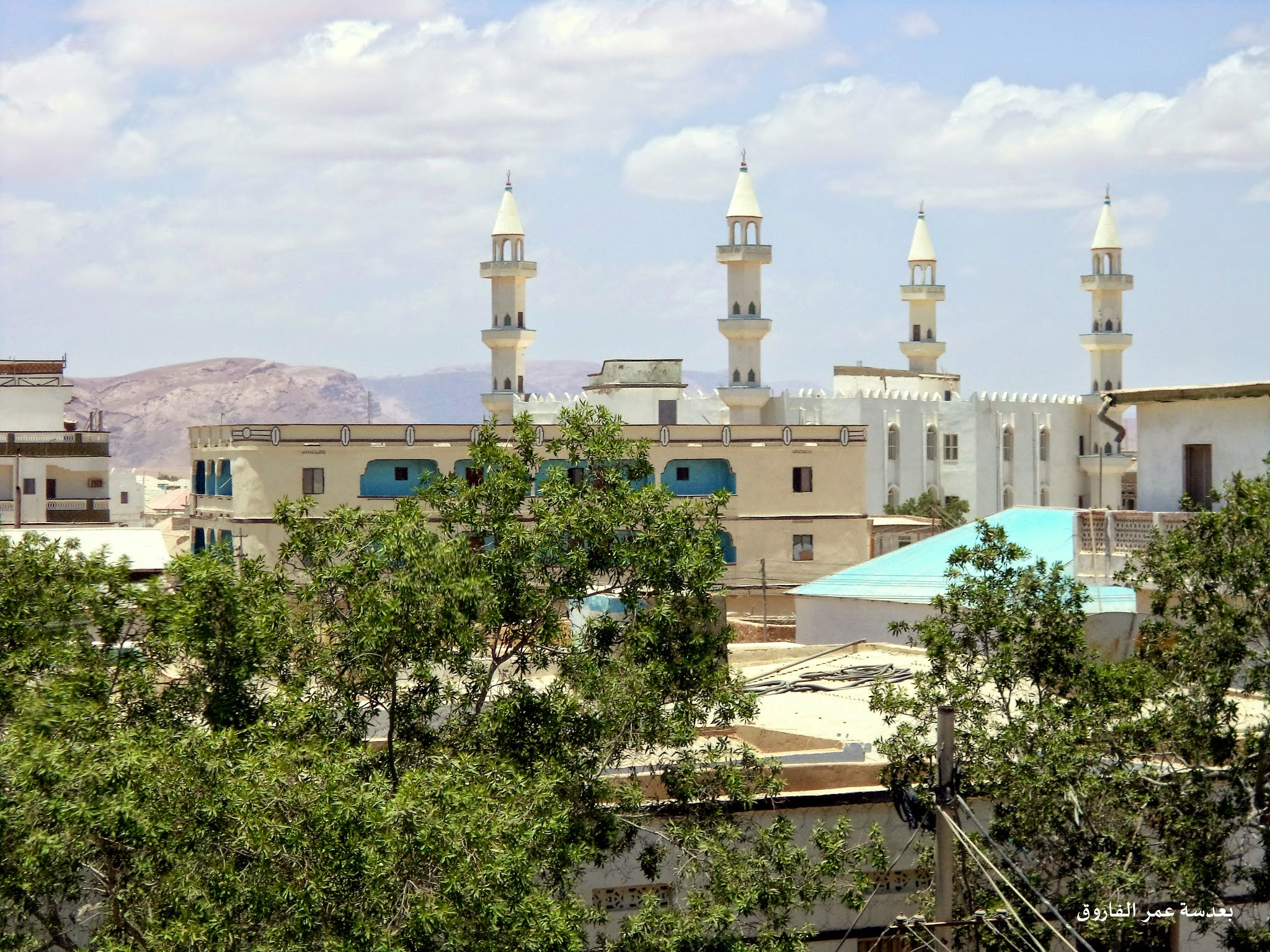
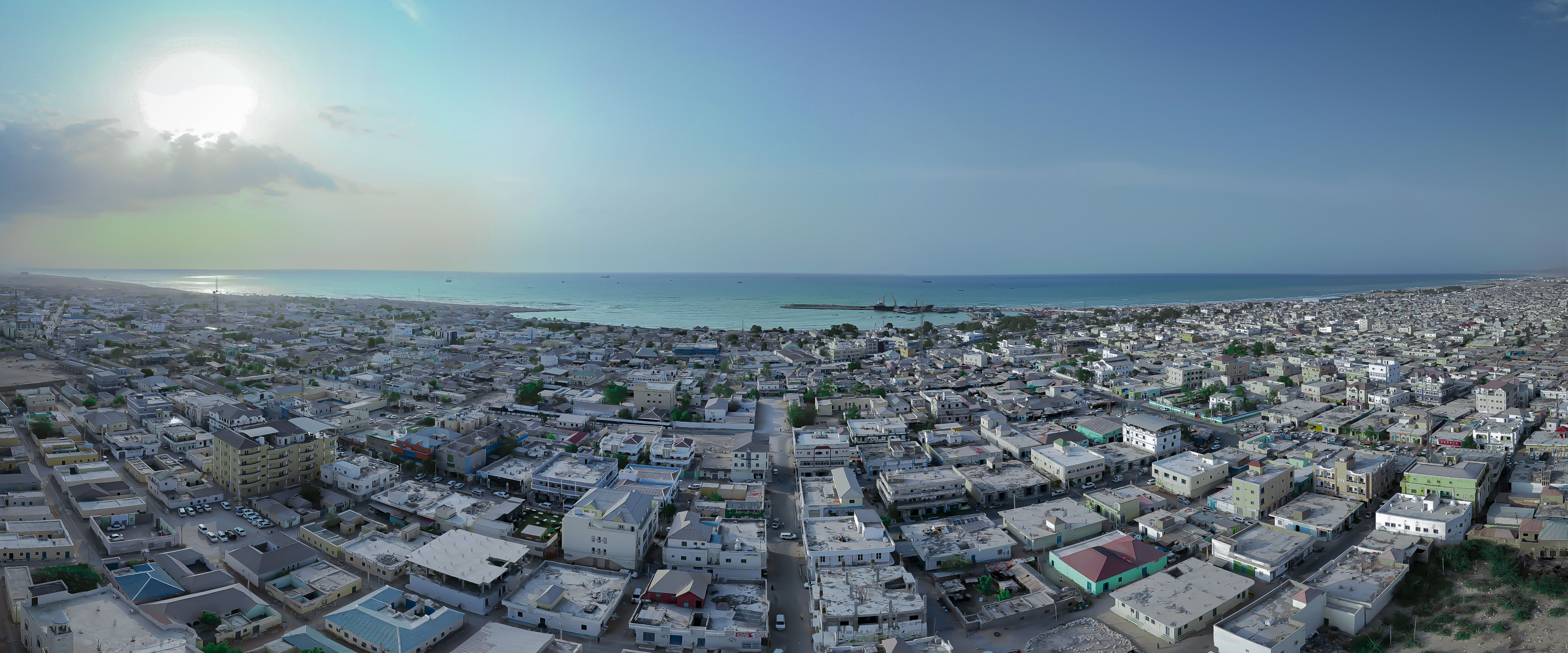

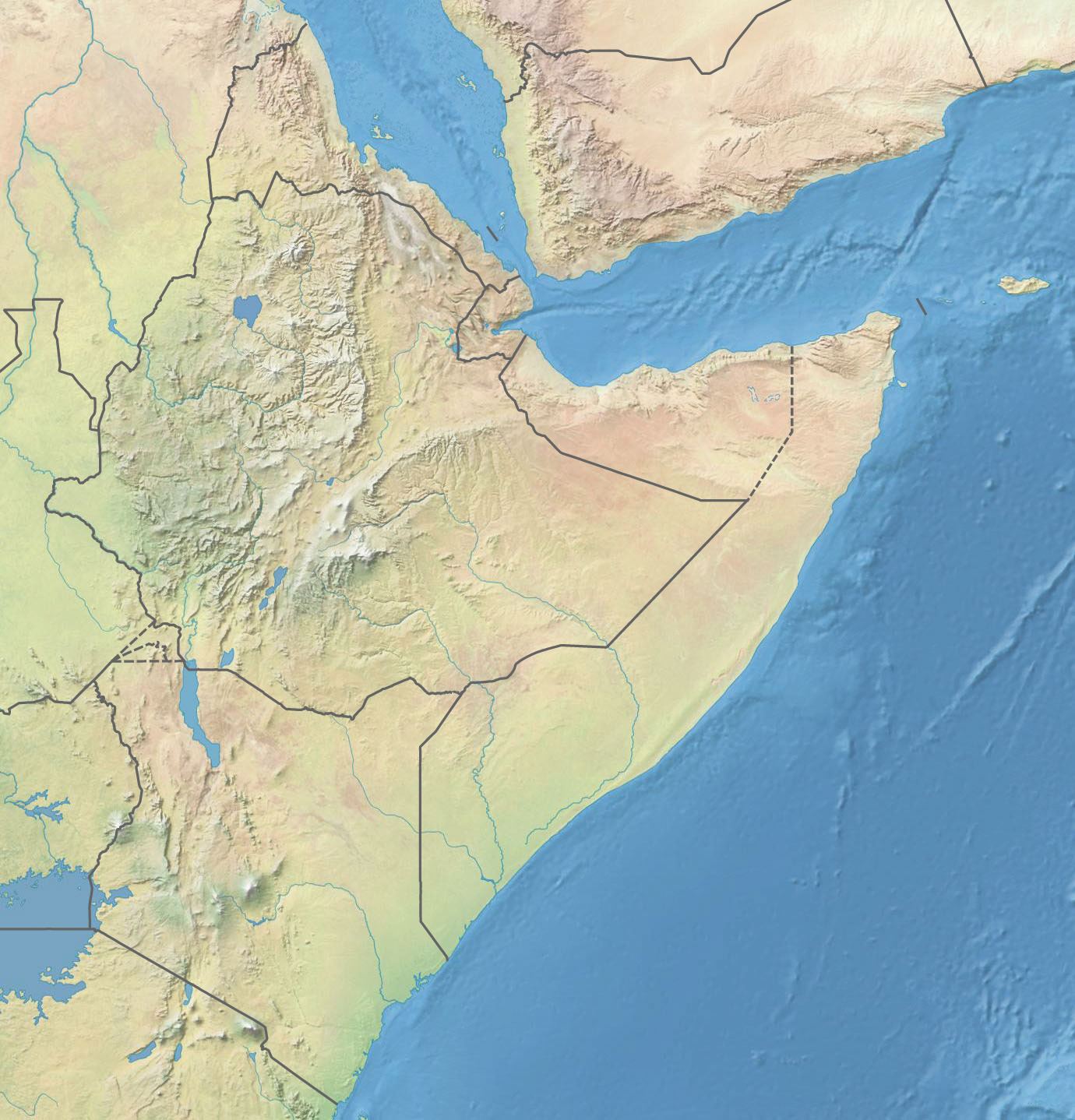
- Location within Somalia Location within the Horn of Africa Location within Africa
- Coordinates: 11°17′19″N 49°10′55″E
- Autonomous state: Puntland
- Region: Bari
- District: Bosaso
- Founded: 18th century

Government
  - Type: Municipality
  - Mayor: Abdirahman Abdillahi jinac

Area
  - Total: 120 km^{2} (46 sq mi)
- Elevation: 15 m (49 ft)

Population (2019)https://www.citypopulation.de/en/somalia/admin/
  - Total: 1,200,000
  - Density: 78.05/km^{2} (202.1/sq mi)
- Time zone: UTC+3 (EAT)
- Climate: BWh
- Website: bosasomunicipality.com

Bosaso (Somali: Boosaaso; Arabic: بوصاصو), historically known as Bender Qassim or Badraan, is a city in the northeastern Bari province of Somalia in Puntland. It is the administrative capital of the Bosaso District and the principal commercial center of the Puntland regional state. Located on the southern coast of the Gulf of Aden, Bosaso serves as a major port facilitating trade between Somalia, the Arabian Peninsula, East Africa, and international markets.

The city is the economic hub of Puntland, with a diversified economy that includes maritime trade, fisheries, livestock exports, mining, and commerce. The Port of Bosaso is the largest in Puntland and among the busiest in Somalia, handling exports such as livestock, fish, frankincense, and gold. Bosaso also hosts regional government offices, educational institutions, and service facilities, connecting the coast to inland areas through its road networks.

Bosaso has experienced rapid urban growth, attracting traders, migrants, and job seekers from across Somalia and neighboring regions. As of 2020, its population was estimated at around 700,000. The city is informally nicknamed “Bosaso Deeqa,” reflecting its perception as a place of opportunity and economic activity. Its strategic location along the Gulf of Aden continues to shape its role as a center of commerce, administration, and social life in northern Somalia.

The city has a diverse economy centered on education, government, banking, tourism, aviation, food, clothes, logistics, steel, energy, health care, hospitality, retail and technology. The area's many colleges and universities make it a regional hub of higher education, including law, medicine, engineering, business and entrepreneurship.

== Etymology ==
Bosaso was previously known as Bandar Qasim, a name derived from a local trader of the same name who is said to have first settled in the area during the 14th century. It is believed that Qasim's favourite camel was called Boosaas, from which derived the current name of the town. The town was thus first called Bandar Qassim after its founder ("Qasim's town"), then later dubbed Bosaso after its founder's trusted camel. Historically, Bosaso has been a Harti stronghold, and evolved as a coastal town.

== History ==
The Periplus of the Erythraean Sea indicates that Ancient Greek merchants sailed to Bosaso, providing notes about the strategic and geographical location of the current Bosaso area, which was known as Mosylon in ancient times.

About 3 1/2 hours' walk from Bet Qasim, we came to Bander Kasin (also called by the Arabs: the native name is Bosaso), which was built about sixty years ago. The Kaptallah was considered as first settlers.

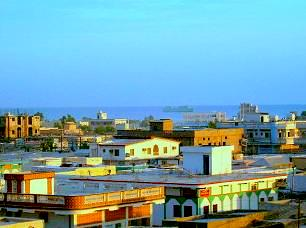
Overview of Bosaso

For centuries the city was among the areas ruled by Dishiishe clan.Over time, Bosaso became predominantly inhabited by Somali clans belonging to the Harti branch of the Darod clan-family, the Dishishe, alongside other Harti groups. Later forming a part of Italian Somaliland. The town would eventually be administered through the official Bari region in the post-independence period. The city has also historically included Somali Arab clans, reflecting its long-standing role as a port city engaged in trade across the Gulf of Aden and the Red Sea. These settlement patterns were shaped by maritime commerce, migration, and regional connectivity rather than fixed political boundaries.

Its position on the northeastern coast of Somalia made it an important center for maritime trade and cultural exchange for centuries. The city’s early economy was based on fishing, livestock trade, and regional and long-distance commerce, attracting merchants from the Arabian Peninsula, Persia, and East Africa. Commodities such as frankincense, dates, livestock, and textiles were traded through the port, linking inland Somali communities with overseas markets.

During the pre-colonial period, Bosaso was governed by local Somali clans who exercised authority over trade routes, port activities, and settlement affairs. The city formed part of a broader network of northern Somali coastal ports, including Berbera and Zeila, which facilitated commerce across the Red Sea and the Gulf of Aden. Interactions between Somali, Arab, and Persian traders contributed to Bosaso’s diverse cultural and social character, introducing new commercial practices, linguistic influences, and social customs.

In the late nineteenth and early twentieth centuries, Bosaso’s strategic location attracted the attention of European colonial powers. Although the city remained largely under the control of local authorities, Italian colonial administrators recognized its commercial importance during their rule over southern Somalia. However, colonial investment focused primarily on southern ports, allowing Bosaso to continue developing organically as a regional trading center. Its port remained active, handling goods from inland Somalia and maintaining maritime links with the Middle East and East Africa.

Following Somalia’s independence in 1960, Bosaso’s role as a commercial and administrative center in northeastern Somalia expanded. The city’s port facilitated increased imports and exports, while its markets and growing urban infrastructure attracted traders, workers, and entrepreneurs from across the country. Over time, Bosaso evolved from a small coastal town into a major urban center, increasingly defined by commerce and regional connectivity.

In the late twentieth and early twenty-first centuries, Bosaso played a central role in the formation and consolidation of the Puntland State of Somalia. As the administrative capital of the Bari region and Puntland’s principal seaport, the city experienced rapid population growth and urban expansion. Investments in infrastructure, including port facilities, roads, telecommunications, and public services, strengthened its position as the region’s economic hub. Bosaso also developed as a center for education, administration, and social activity, serving both urban residents and surrounding districts.

Today, Bosaso is recognized for both its historical role in maritime trade and its contemporary significance as a major economic center in northeastern Somalia. Its history reflects continuity in trade, adaptation to political change, and sustained regional importance as a gateway between Somalia and the wider Gulf of Aden region.

Near Bosaso, at the end of the Baalade valley, lies a 2-to-3-kilometre-long (1.2-to-1.9-mile) earthwork. Local tradition recounts that the massive embankment marks the grave of a community matriarch. It is the largest such structure in the wider Horn region.

== Geography ==
=== Location and habitat ===
Bosaso is situated in northeastern Somalia, on the Gulf of Aden coast. Nearby settlements include to the east Rehiss (3.5 km or 2.5 miles), to the northeast Marero (14 km or 8.5 miles), to the west Baalade (3.5 km or 2 miles), to the southwest Laas Geel (16.5 km or 10 miles), to the south Lasgoriga (20.5 km or 13 miles), and to the southeast El Dhurre (36 km or 22.5 miles). The largest cities in the country most proximate to Bosaso are Erigavo (212 km or 132 miles), Burao (442 km or 275 miles), and Berbera (465 km or 289 miles). Shimbiris, the highest peak in Somalia, is located some 220 km (140 miles) to the southwest in the Cal Madow mountain range.

In June 2014, the Puntland government launched a new tree-planting campaign in the state, with the regional Ministry of Environment, Wildlife and Tourism slated to plant 25,000 trees by the end of the year. Bosaso is among the seven cities and towns earmarked for the reforestation initiative, which also include Garowe, Qardho, Dhahar, Buuhoodle, Baran and Galkayo. The campaign is part of a broader partnership between the Puntland authorities and EU to set up various environmental protection measures in the region, with the aim of promoting reforestation and afforestation.

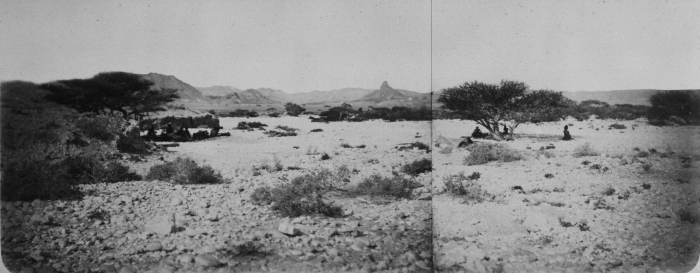
COLLECTIE TROPENMUSEUM Bedding van de rivier Balada in de omgeving van Bender Gasem TMnr 60027146 (Eng; Baalade Valley near Bendergazim) photographed by Georges Revoil c. 1881

=== Climate ===
Bosaso has a hot desert climate (Köppen climate classification BWh). It has a mean annual relative humidity of around 60%. The average daily mean temperature year-round is 30 °C (86 °F), with an average annual high of 35 °C (95 °F) and an average annual low of 25 °C (77 °F). Average low temperatures are coolest during the winter months of December to February, when thermometer readings typically level out at 20 °C (68 °F). The weather slowly heats up in the spring, as the April rainy season begins. Average high temperatures later peak during the summer months of June to August, when they consistently exceed 40 °C (104 °F). Come September, cooler weather starts to set in again. Rainfall reaches a high over this period, with an average precipitation of 7 mm (0.28 inches) in November. Total rainfall year-round is around 19 mm (0.75 inches).

Climate data for Bosaso
Month	Jan	Feb	Mar	Apr	May	Jun	Jul	Aug	Sep	Oct	Nov	Dec	Year
Record high °C (°F)	38.5 (101.3)	37.0 (98.6)	38.5 (101.3)	42.1 (107.8)	45.0 (113.0)	45.0 (113.0)	45.2 (113.4)	45.3 (113.5)	44.7 (112.5)	45.0 (113.0)	36.0 (96.8)	36.0 (96.8)	45.3 (113.5)
Mean daily maximum °C (°F)	29.0 (84.2)	30.0 (86.0)	31.0 (87.8)	34.0 (93.2)	37.0 (98.6)	41.0 (105.8)	41.0 (105.8)	40.0 (104.0)	39.0 (102.2)	33.0 (91.4)	30.0 (86.0)	29.0 (84.2)	35.0 (95.0)
Daily mean °C (°F)	25.0 (77.0)	25.0 (77.0)	26.7 (80.1)	28.8 (83.8)	31.1 (88.0)	35.6 (96.1)	36.1 (97.0)	35.6 (96.1)	33.3 (91.9)	27.8 (82.0)	25.6 (78.1)	25.6 (78.1)	30.0 (86.0)
Mean daily minimum °C (°F)	20.6 (69.1)	20.6 (69.1)	21.6 (70.9)	24.4 (75.9)	26.1 (79.0)	30.6 (87.1)	31.7 (89.1)	30.0 (86.0)	28.3 (82.9)	22.2 (72.0)	21.1 (70.0)	20.0 (68.0)	25.0 (77.0)
Record low °C (°F)	12.5 (54.5)	14.0 (57.2)	15.0 (59.0)	16.8 (62.2)	19.0 (66.2)	21.3 (70.3)	23.0 (73.4)	24.5 (76.1)	21.3 (70.3)	14.0 (57.2)	11.5 (52.7)	11.5 (52.7)	11.5 (52.7)
Average rainfall mm (inches)	0 (0)	0 (0)	1 (0.0)	3 (0.1)	3 (0.1)	0 (0)	0 (0)	0 (0)	0 (0)	2 (0.1)	7 (0.3)	3 (0.1)	19 (0.7)
Average relative humidity (%)	66	68	64	64	62	48	40	48	56	70	74	71	61
Percentage possible sunshine	80	80	87	80	80	80	80	80	80	80	80	80	81
Source 1: Arab Meteorology Book
Source 2: Deutscher Wetterdienst (extremes), Food and Agriculture Organization: Somalia Water and Land Management (percent sunshine)

== Demographics ==
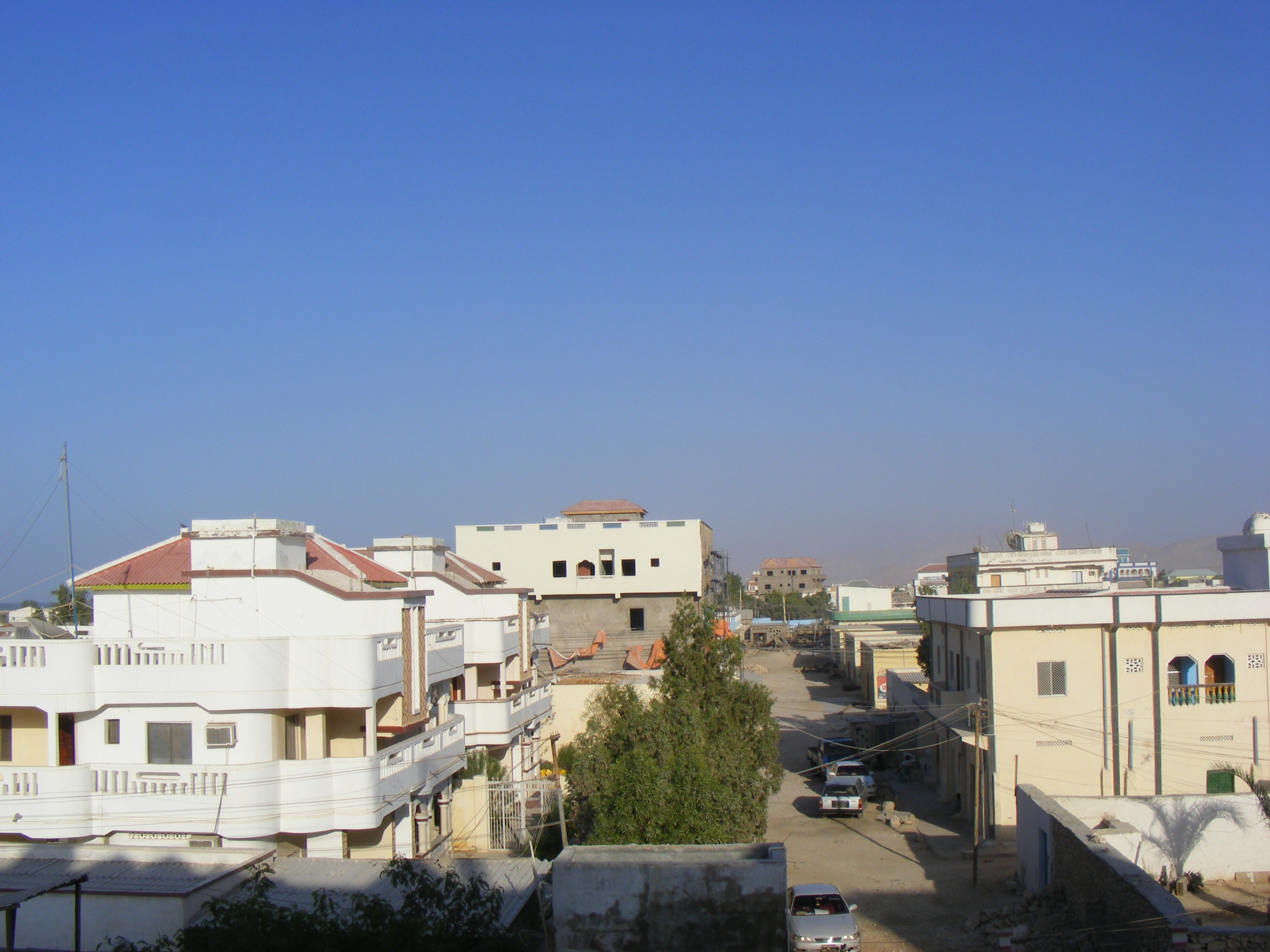
A residential area in Bosaso

Bosaso's population is estimated at 700,000 residents. It is the third largest city in Somalia after Mogadishu and Hargeisa. While Bosaso is a melting pot, with residents hailing from all the major clans of Somalia, most of its population is from the Harti confederation of Darod sub-clans. Reliable census and survey data on Bosaso are limited, but estimates from United Nations agencies and humanitarian assessments can be used to trace population changes in both the Bosaso District (administrative area) and the city of Bosaso (urban core).

The Bosaso District has experienced significant growth. According to a 2005 breakdown by UNDP/UN OCHA, Bosaso’s total population was 164,906—divided into 107,181 urban and 57,725 non-urban residents. The UNDP estimate thus indicates the urban share was roughly 65% of district population at that time. Later, the Population Estimation Survey of Somalia conducted by UNFPA and the Somali National Bureau of Statistics estimated Bosaso District’s population in 2013–2014 at 469,566. Subsequent projections and compiled estimates placed the district’s population at about 615,000 by 2019. During the 2021–2022 drought crisis, the International Organization for Migration projected an influx of 52,471 internally displaced or drought-affected people entering Bosaso District.

The city of Bosaso has also seen considerable growth. In 2005, of the total 164,906 district residents, 107,181 were recorded as urban (i.e. residing in Bosaso town), giving an early estimate for the city core population. A 2009 UN-Habitat urban planning document estimated the city’s population at about 250,000, including approximately 45,000 internally displaced persons; these figures are referred to in the UNDP Bosaso City Strategy (2024). By 2015, secondary statistical compilations listed the urban population at approximately 235,000. Humanitarian assessments during the 2020s recorded a large displaced population. In April 2024, a UNHCR/CCCM site verification confirmed 116,740 internally displaced persons living in 22 sites across Bosaso.

In short that the district’s urban core had about 107,181 residents in 2005, that district population growth later took it to the 400–600 thousand range by the 2010s, and that estimates for the city’s population (excluding or including IDPs) range between ~235,000 and ~250,000 in the 2010s, though some unverified claims assert 700,000 or more.

Furthermore, Bosaso is a major port for boats carrying emigrants from within the country as well as adjacent territories across the Gulf of Aden to settle (sometimes illegally) in the Persian Gulf states.

While Bosaso today is a melting pot, with residents hailing from many different parts of Somalia, most of the city's population is from Dishiishe, Majeerteen, Warsangeli and other Harti groups of Darod. The city is also home to newly arrived IDPs.

== Government and administration ==
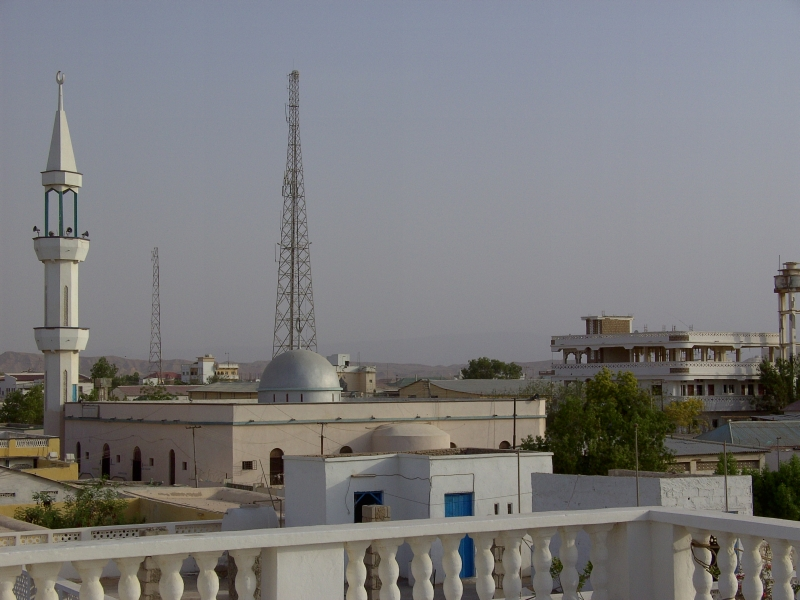
The Bosaso horizon

Bosaso serves as the administrative capital of the Bari region and is the seat of the Bosaso District. The city operates under the administrative framework of the Puntland State of Somalia, within the federal system of Somalia.

Municipal governance is led by an elected mayor, supported by an elected city council and local administrative departments responsible for urban planning, public services, taxation, sanitation, and local security coordination.The municipal government works alongside regional authorities to manage infrastructure development, economic regulation, and social services. As a regional administrative center, Bosaso hosts government offices, courts, and public institutions that serve both urban residents and surrounding districts. The city’s administrative importance is reinforced by its economic role and population size, making it one of the most influential cities in Puntland.

=== Current mayor of Bosaso ===
Abdirahman Abdullahi Ali

Bosaso city affairs are managed by the Bosaso Municipality, its leadership is appointed by members of the area's 29 District Councilors. The municipal authority was previously led by Abdisalam Bashiir Abdisalam who succeeded Yasin Mire Mohamud who himself succeeded Hassan Abdallah Hassan in office.

Each of the city's various districts also has its own municipal sub-authorities, complete with a mayor and civil servants.

== Economy ==
Bosaso is a major commercial and economic center of the Puntland State of Somalia and an important city in northeastern Somalia. The city has a diversified economy that includes maritime trade, livestock exports, fisheries, mining, agriculture, traditional markets, and a concentration of business enterprises. Its location on the southern coast of the Gulf of Aden, together with its port facilities and transport connections, has supported its development as a center for regional and international commerce.

Port and trade

The Port of Bosaso is the largest port in Puntland and one of the busiest ports in Somalia. It serves as the main entry and exit point for imports and exports in northeastern Somalia and connects the region with markets in the Middle East, East Africa, and other destinations. Goods handled at the port include livestock, fish, frankincense, gold, construction materials, and general merchandise.

Bosaso plays an important role in Somalia’s livestock trade. Camels, goats, sheep, and cattle are exported from the city, mainly to Gulf countries such as Saudi Arabia, Yemen, and Oman. Livestock exports form a central part of the local and regional economy.

The city also functions as a major import and distribution center. Goods arriving in Bosaso are supplied to Puntland, central Somalia, Somaliland, and Somali-inhabited areas of Ethiopia. Local markets provide foodstuffs, consumer goods, fuel, and construction materials, supporting Bosaso’s role as a commercial center for a wide hinterland. The city’s commercial districts accommodate both small traders and larger business enterprises.

Fisheries

The Bari region, in which Bosaso is located, has long been an important fishing area in Somalia. Coastal communities have relied on fishing for centuries, with the Gulf of Aden and surrounding waters providing marine resources. Bosaso accounts for a large share of Somalia’s exported fish, supplying both domestic markets and international buyers. The fisheries sector provides employment and income for residents of the city and nearby coastal communities and contributes to food supply and export earnings.

Frankincense trade

Bosaso and the surrounding Puntland region are known for the production of Somali frankincense, particularly from Boswellia sacra and Boswellia frereana. These trees grow in arid and rocky environments, and resin is collected using traditional harvesting methods. Frankincense produced in the region is used in incense, perfumes, and traditional medicine.

The historical importance of frankincense production in the area is reflected in the name Punt, from which Puntland takes its name. Ancient sources describe trade connections between this region and Egypt, Arabia, and other parts of the ancient world. Frankincense continues to be an important source of income for local communities, with exports reaching markets in the Middle East, Asia, and Europe.

Bosaso serves as the main commercial center for the frankincense trade, particularly for products sourced from the Cal-Miskaat region. The city hosts markets where different grades of frankincense are traded and prepared for export, mainly to Middle Eastern markets.

Bosaso acts as a commercial center for gold mining activities in the Bari region. Gold extracted from areas such as Galgala, including the mining town of Milxo and nearby sites, is traded in the city. This trade supports employment and economic activity through the involvement of miners, traders, and exporters.The Bari region, is an important area for date cultivation in Somalia. Its arid climate, seasonal riverbeds, and irrigation practices support extensive date plantations. The region contains a large concentration of date farms, producing fresh and dried dates for domestic use and export to neighboring countries.Many date plantations continue to operate using traditional farming methods rather than modern commercial systems. Date cultivation remains an economic activity that supports rural livelihoods and reflects long-standing agricultural practices in the region.

Bosaso is a city that is experiencing rapid growth. Prior to the Somali civil war, it had a population of under 50,000 inhabitants. Since the conflict, Somalis belonging to the Harti Darod sub-clans began migrating back to their ancestral areas of Puntland. As a consequence of these migrations, Bosaso's population and the local housing industry have grown tremendously.

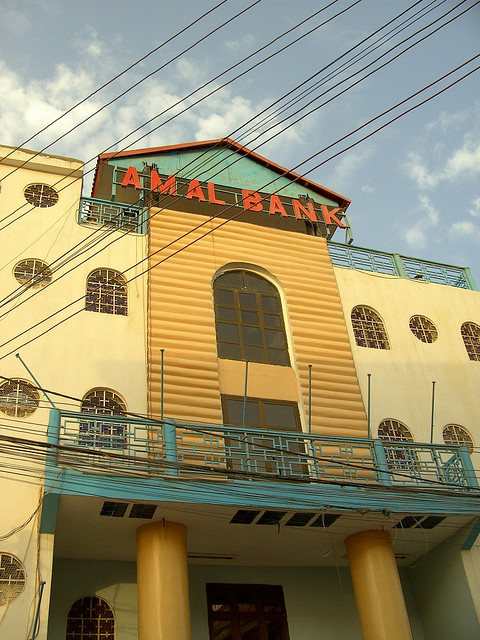
An Amal Bank branch in Bosaso

In December 2011, a new commercial market opened in Bosaso's northern Dayaha ("Star") neighborhood, near the port. Approximately one-half kilometre (550 yd) in size, it was designed to ensure easy vehicle access. The market is the result of careful planning between Puntland government officials and civil society representatives. In September 2013, Puntland Minister of Fisheries Mohamed Farah Adan also announced that the Ministry in conjunction with the FAO would open a new fish market in the city, complete with modern refrigerators.

Bosaso is home to Golis Telecom Somalia, the largest telecommunications operator in northeastern Somalia. Founded in 2002 with the objective of supplying the country with GSM mobile services, fixed line and internet services, it has an extensive network that covers all of the nation's major cities and more than 40 districts in both Puntland and Somaliland. According to The Economist, Golis offers one of the cheapest international calling rates on the planet, at US$0.2 less than anywhere else in the world. In addition, Netco has its headquarters in the city. Other telecommunication firms serving the region include Telcom and NationLink.

In September 2013, Puntland Deputy Minister of Environment Burhan Elmi Hirsi also announced a plan by the Puntland government to establish a gas manufacturing plant in Bosaso. The new project is part of a broader campaign by the Puntland environmental authorities to avert deforestation and promote alternative sources of fuel.

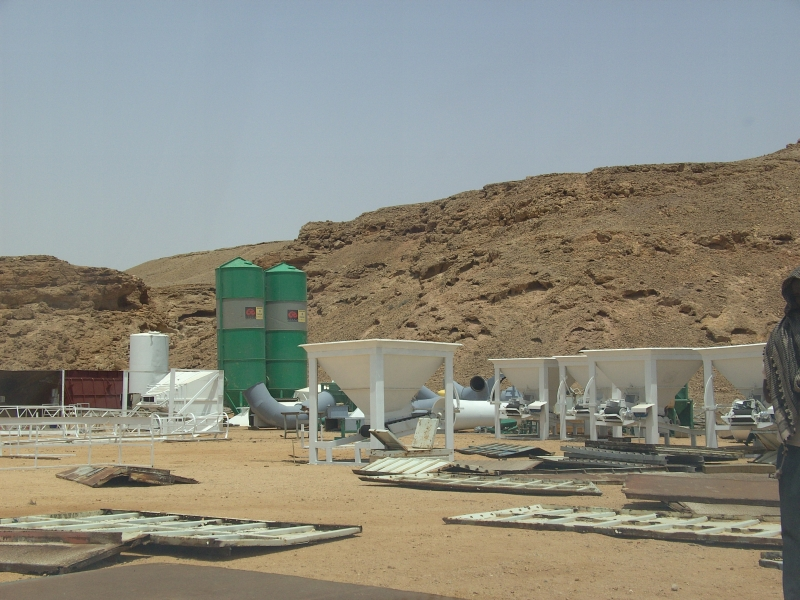
Cement making machines on the outskirts of Bosaso

The Hafun Fishing Company was established in 1992 in Bosaso. It was named after the northeastern port town of Hafun, where HFC also has an office. The firm exports a wide range of fish products, which it mainly sends to partners in the Middle East. The company is exploring additional global markets for its fish goods. It also maintains commercial interests in Puntland's housing market, which are represented by the firm's growing local real estate sales and development division.

Additionally, the Bosaso Tannery is based in the city. A ten-year-old manufacturing, distributing, wholesale and import/export company, it processes wet salted, dry salted, wet blue, limed, pickled, and air/frame dried sheep and goat hides and skin. Principle wet blue exports are to Turkey, Pakistan, India and China. Raw camel hides and sheep and goat skin are also exported to the United Arab Emirates.

== Transportation ==
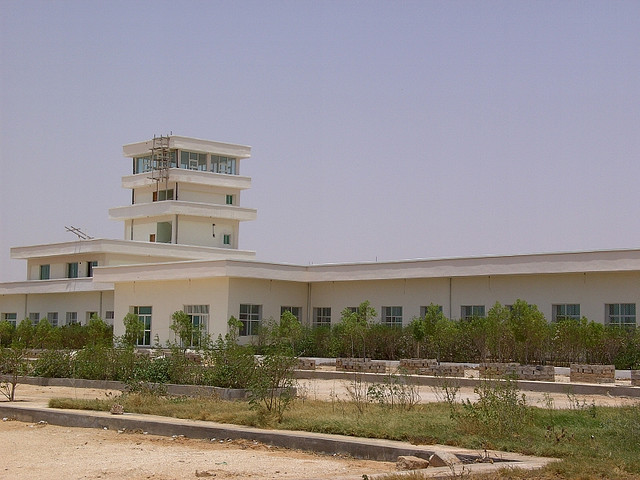
The Bender Qassim International Airport in 2007, prior to renovations

Bosaso is traversed by a 750-kilometre (470 mi) north–south highway. It connects major cities in the northern part of the country, such as Galkayo and Garowe, with towns in the south. In June 2012, the Puntland Highway Authority (PHA) launched an upgrade and repair project on the large thoroughfare between Bosaso and Garowe. The transportation body also began rehabilitation work in October 2012 on the central artery linking the city with Qardho. Additionally, plans are in the works to construct new roads connecting littoral towns in the region to the main highway. In June 2014, Puntland President Abdiweli Mohamed Ali along with Bosaso Mayor Hassan Abdallah Hassan and other state officials also inaugurated a new 5.9-kilometre (3.7 mi) paved road in the city. The construction project leads to the Bosaso seaport, and was completed in conjunction with UNHABITAT. According to Ali, his administration plans to invest at least 23 million Euros in contributions from international partners in similar road infrastructure development initiatives.

The city has a major seaport, the Port of Bosaso. It was constructed during the mid-1980s by the Siad Barre administration for annual livestock shipments to the Middle East. In January 2012, a renovation project was launched, with KMC contracted to upgrade the Bosaso Port's harbor. The initiative's first phase saw the clean-up of unwanted materials from the dockyard and was completed within the month. The second phase involves the reconstruction of the port's adjoining seabed, with the objective of accommodating larger ships.

Besides its busy seaport, Bosaso has a major airport, the Bender Qassim International Airport. In 2008, the Puntland government signed a multimillion-dollar deal with Dubai's Lootah Group, a regional industrial group operating in the Middle East and Africa. According to the agreement, the first phase of the investment is worth Dhs170m ($46.28m) and will see a set of new companies established to operate, manage and build Bosaso's free trade zone and sea and airport facilities. The Bosaso Airport Company is slated to develop the airport complex to meet international standards, including a new 3.4-kilometre (2.1 mi) runway, main and auxiliary buildings, taxi and apron areas, and security perimeters. In December 2014, the foundation stone for a new runway was also laid at the airport. The China Civil Engineering Construction Corporation is now slated to upgrade the airport's existing gravel runway, pave it with asphalt, and convert it from 1.8 to 2.65 km (1.12 to 1.65 miles) in accordance with the code 4C operations clause.

== Education ==
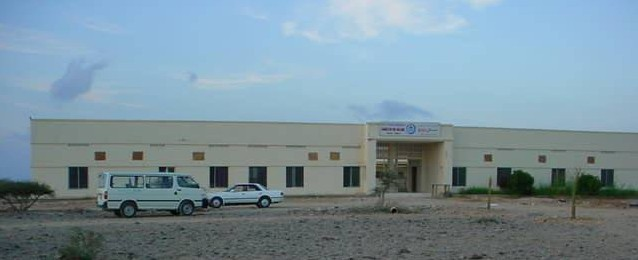
Entrance to East Africa University's Bosaso campus

Bosaso has a number of academic institutions. According to the Puntland Ministry of Education, there are 74 primary schools in the Bosaso District. Among these are the Iftin School, Alfurqan, Umul-Qura and Garisa. Secondary schools in the area include Hamdan, Shafi'i, Ughaz Yasin, Najah, Bosaso and Haji Yasin.

Tertiary education is provided by Bosaso College (BC), as well as the Puntland Nursing Institute (PNI). East Africa University (EAU) also has a Bosaso branch, one of its seven campuses in Puntland. Additionally, the Sam Greathouse School of Modern Technology (SG-SMT) has been working with the local government to construct a large scale dial-up network linking Bosaso to other northern Somali cities, including Berbera and Las Anod.

== Panorama ==
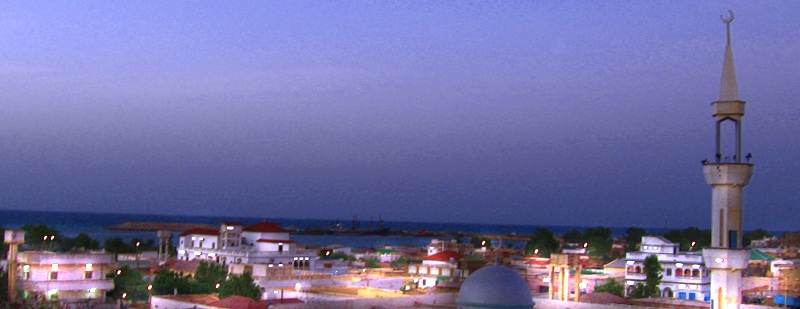
Bosaso panorama at dusk
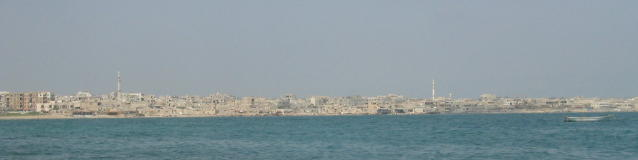
Bosaso cityscape

== Tourist attractions ==
Biyo Kulule is a hot spring located southeast of the city, 7 kilometres (4.3 mi) outside the city.

Mareero located (25 kilometres (16 mi) eastern direction of Bosaso, it is known for its white sand beach.

Ga'a, Laag, Karin, Yalho are considered as places to visit.

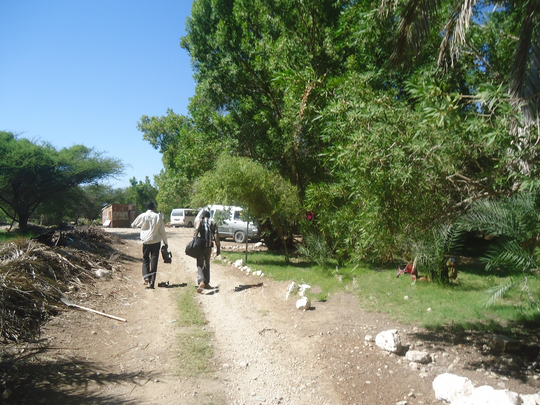
Biyo Kulule

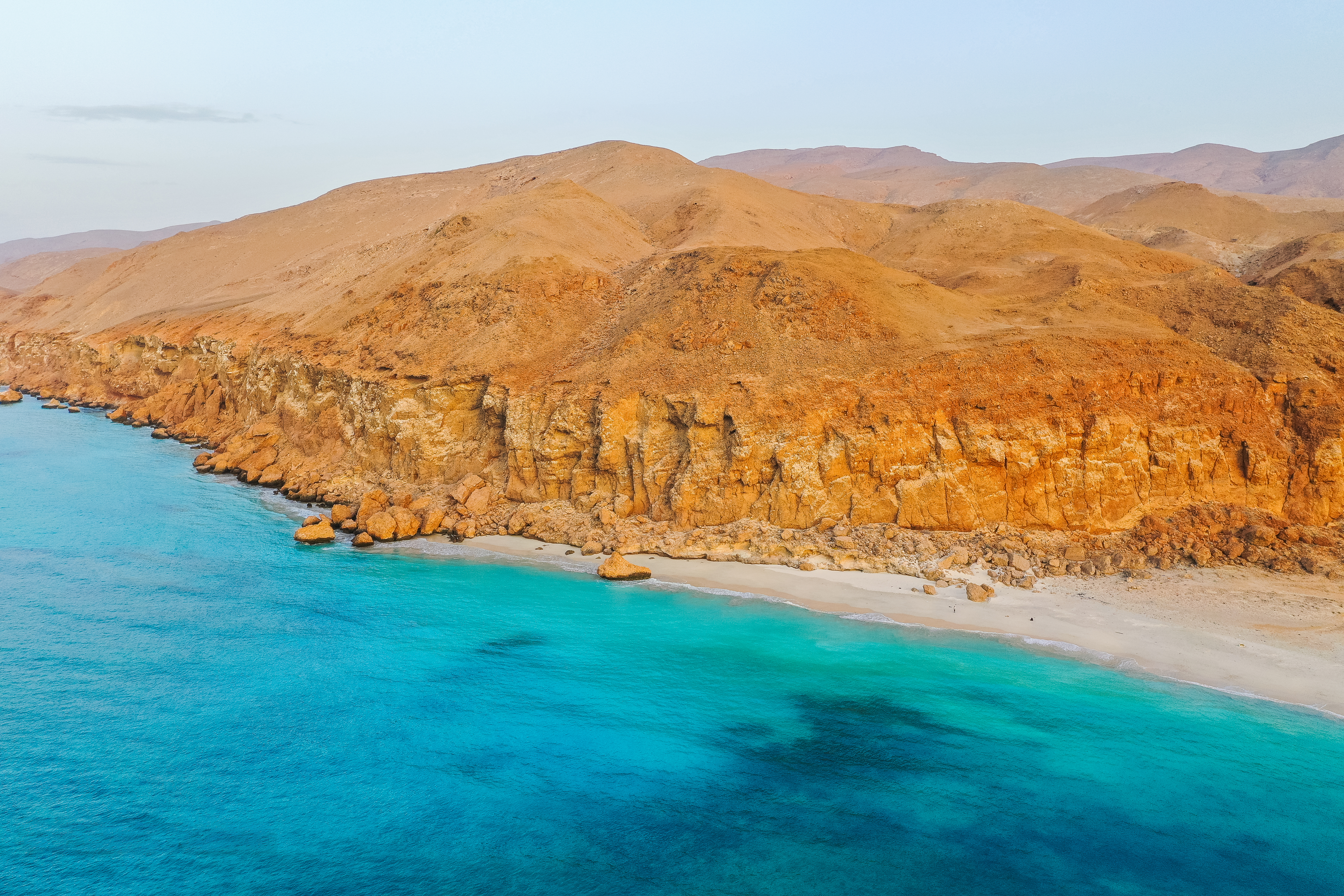
Mareero Beach

== Media ==
Bosaso is home to a number of private media outlets. Radio Daljir, Puntland's largest radio station, has its main headquarters in the city. The broadcaster's network of seven FM transmitters reaches most of Puntland as well as part of the neighboring Galmudug region to the south. Also centered in Bosaso with its studios in Garowe is the Somali Broadcasting Corporation (SBC), Puntland's oldest and second largest private radio station. Additionally, Horseed Radio, Al Xigma, and One Nation Radio have headquarters in the city. In May 2013, Radio Garowe likewise launched a new FM station in Bosaso.

The city also has its own private television channels and studios, the Eastern Television Network (ETN TV) and SBC TV.

== Districts ==
Bosaso is subdivided into 16 administrative villages.

== Sister cities ==
On 12 August 2016 Mayor Yasin Mire Mohamud of Bosaso and Mayor Betsy Hodges of Minneapolis jointly signed the memorandum of understanding that formalizes the Sister City relationship, the agreement was previously approved by Minneapolis council later embraced by Bosaso local council.

Country	City
United States	Minneapolis

== See also ==
- Garowe-Bosaso Highway
- Somali Architecture

== Sources ==
- "The Weekly Review". The Weekly Review. Stellascope Ltd. 1993.
- Bosaso - Coordinates
