= Islamic State insurgency in Puntland =

Insurgency in Somalia

- Part of American military intervention in Puntland, War against the Islamic State, and war on terror
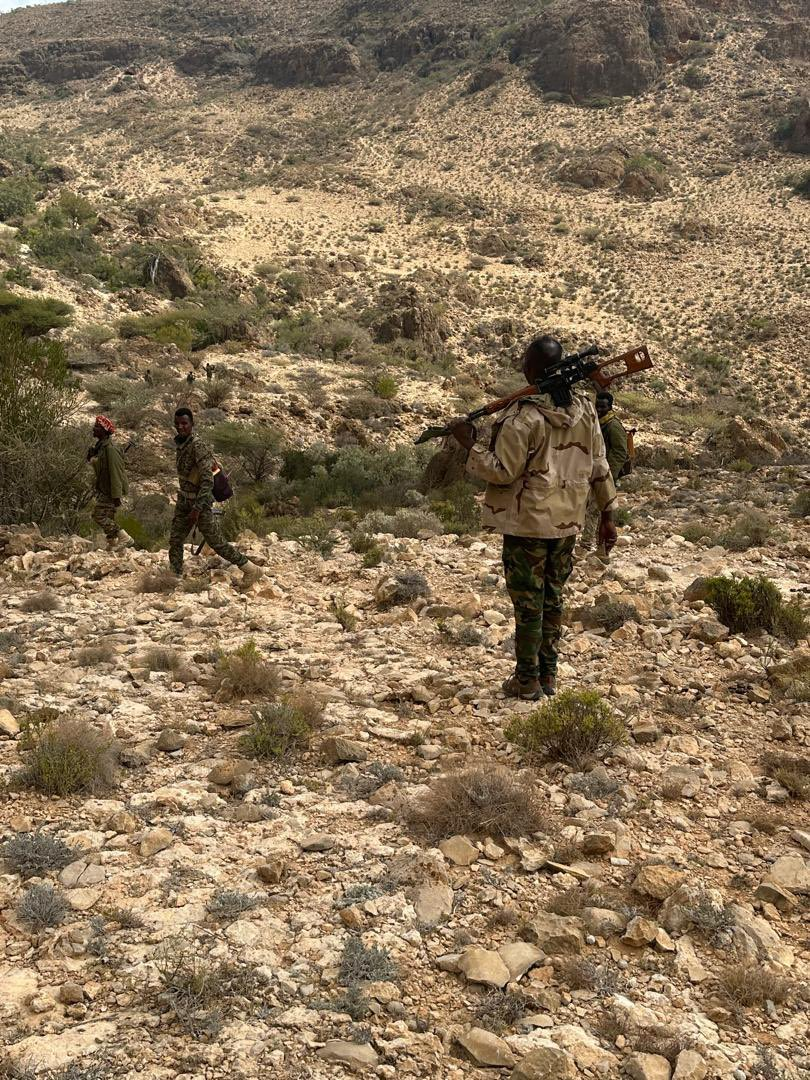
- Sniper during security operations against ISIS forces in the Almiskaad mountains (March 2025)
Date	22 October 2015 – present (11 years, 1 week and 2 days)
Location	Bari Region
Status	Ongoing: Qandala campaign, 26 October – 18 December 2016 (1 month, 3 weeks and 1 day)

Belligerents
Puntland; United States; United Arab Emirates	Islamic State; Somalia Wilayah

Commanders and leaders
(Puntland) Said Abdullahi Deni; (Puntland) Ilyas Osman Lugator; Former: (Puntland) Abdiweli Gaas; (Puntland) Abdihakim Amey; (Puntland) Ahmed Elmi Osman; (United States) Donald Trump; (United States) Pete Hegseth; Former: (United States) Joe Biden; (United States) Robert Gates; (United States) Leon Panetta; (United States) Chuck Hagel; (United States) Ash Carter; (United States) Jim Mattis; (United States) Mark Esper; (United States) Lloyd Austin; (United States) Barack Obama	(Islamic State) Abdirahman Fahiye Isse Mohamud (Emir of ISS); (Islamic State) Abdul Qadir Mumin (leader of ISS al-Karrar office); (Islamic State) Abdirahman Shirwac Aw-Said (surrendered); Casualties: (Islamic State) Abdirahman Fahiye Isse Mohamud † (Deputy of Abdul Qadir Mumin); (Islamic State) Mahad Maalin †; (Islamic State) Abdihakim Mohamed Ibrahim ("Dhoqob") †; (Islamic State) Bilal al-Sudani 23 January 2023 †

Units involved
Puntland armed forces; Puntland Security Force; Puntland Dervish Force; Puntland Maritime Police Force; Puntland Police Force; (United States) US Armed Forces; US Army; US Navy; DEVGRU; US Air Force; AFRICOM; UAE Armed Forces; UAE Air Force	Military of the Islamic State; (Islamic State) Assassination Squad

Strength
(Puntland) ~15,800; ~ 100	(Islamic State) 600–700 (UN est.); 1,000-strong (Puntland government est.)

Casualties and losses
Unknown	Operation Hilaac: 820+ militants killed (UN est.) 900+ Killed in Action
- Qandala campaign 25,700+ displaced Hillaac campaign 19,640+ families displaced, (December–ongoing 2024)

The Islamic State insurgency in Puntland started on 22 October 2015 after former al-Shabaab jihadist Abdul Qadir Mumin pledged allegiance to Abu Bakr al-Baghdadi and the Islamic State, creating the "Islamic State in Somalia" (Abnaa ul-Calipha) and settling in the Galgala region, in Puntland.

Since the onset of the Islamic State in Puntland, it has engaged in numerous clashes with al-Shabab, Puntland forces, and the United States' military. In 2016, the Islamic State took control of Qandala for nearly two weeks. In 2018, heavy fighting broke out between the Islamic State and al-Shabab. In 2019, the Islamic State carried out IED attacks. Puntland Forces also executed several Al-Shaabab and Islamic State militants. In 2020, Puntland began a campaign against the Islamic State with the help of the US military. The Islamic State claimed to have killed US troops. In 2021, the Islamic State continued hit and run attacks. In 2023, the Islamic State increased its activity and engaged in a few skirmishes with Al-Shabaab in 2023. On January 25, Bilal al-Sudani was killed in a raid by DEVGRU.

In November 2024, the semi-autonomous state of Puntland declared a major military offensive, led by the Puntland Security Forces, Puntland Dervish Forces,Puntland Maritime Police Forces, with support from the United States Africa Command, and the United Arab Emirate Airforce against the Islamic State in the Bari region. The operation was codenamed Hilaac Operation. This marked the first time that Puntland forces had launched a major military offensive on this scale since the Qandala campaign in 2016.

== Background ==
=== Qandala taken over by Islamic State ===
On October 26, 2016, fighters aligned with the Islamic State captured the small port town of Qandala in Puntland's Bari region. This was the first town Islamic State had taken control of in Somalia, the first notable expansion of their influence beyond their usual mountainous hideouts.

The takeover led to the displacement of over 25,700 civilians and the humanitarian impact of the conflict.

=== Counter-Offensive ===
Puntland Security Forces (PSF) launched a counter-offensive on December 3, 2016, which took aim at retaking Qandala. This operation involved both land and sea movements and faced resistance from Islamic State fighters, who had set up defenses around the town.

On December 7, 2016, Puntland forces successfully retook Qandala, with no resistance encountered as Islamic State had retreated to the mountainous areas south of the town.

After retaking Qandala, Puntland forces continued their operations into the nearby mountains, where they attacked and destroyed an Islamic State base at El Ladid on December 18, 2016. This was part of efforts to prevent Islamic State from regrouping.

Qandala's capture was both strategically and symbolically important for Islamic State. It provided them with a port for potential supply lines from Yemen and was a symbol of resistance due to historical significance in Somali culture.

The conflict exacerbated humanitarian issues, with schools closed, and the local population facing increased hardships amidst an ongoing drought. Humanitarian aid was provided to some of the displaced in nearby areas that included Buruc village.

=== Puntland police arrested Islamic State members ===
On 26 June 2023, the Puntland Police Force arrested nine foreign individuals from Ethiopia, Sudan and Syria in Amaamo, Balidhidin of the Bari region and released their names.

== Escalation in clashes during 2024 ==
=== Dharjaale battle ===
On the early morning of 31 December 2024, 12 Inghimāsīyyūn from the Islamic State attacked an amassing Dervish force prepped for the Hilaac campaign. The assault began with a suicide vehicle-borne improvised explosive device (SVBIED) targeting the supply camp, causing both casualties and material damage. This was shortly followed by another SVBIED, which included two suicide bombers, targeting the main camp. After the initial explosions, the remaining Inghimāsīyyūn began engaging Puntland forces for several hours until they were eliminated. Puntland forces said they had killed 8 fighters and had "foiled" the attack. Following the attack, multiple videos and images were released by reporters showing a collapsed building resulting from the SVBIED blasts, several burned-out vehicles, and the bodies of the Islamic State fighters. Amaq later released a report stating to have killed 20+ Puntland forces and wounded over 10, and inflicted significant material damage, which aligned with what had been reported. Puntland's claim of foiling the attack was questioned by some security analysts, as the role of an Inghimāsīy is to inflict as much damage as possible, expecting to be killed. Given that the Islamic State successfully achieved this objective, it could be seen that the Dharjaale assault was a victory for the Islamic State. This attack was the first of its kind in terms of scale and sophistication for the Islamic State in Somalia, occurring just after Puntland announced a major offensive against both the Islamic State and al-Shabaab. President Said Abdullahi Deni has been actively involved, meeting with security officials in Bosaso to prepare for this campaign. The offensive is seen as part of a broader strategy to eliminate the Islamic State presence in the region, with some implications for Islamic State operations in Western & Central Africa.

After the Islamic State attack, high-ranking officials, including members of the Task Force, Puntland lawmakers, the Director of the Puntland Maritime Police Force, and presidential aides, were at the airport to manage the evacuation of the injured soldiers. The soldiers were flown out of Bosaso Airport to Ethiopia for medical care due to the complication of injuries resulting from the explosions.

=== Islamic State mining gold in the Cal Miskaad mountains ===
Puntland officials said they are investigating how Islamic State uses gold mining in Cal-Miskaad of the Bari region to fund its activities. The group is mining gold and other resources in the mountains and taking advantage of the area's rich mineral deposits. Islamic State hires local workers for the mining operations. At the same time, people living in areas controlled by Islamic State are forced to pay money to avoid interference with their lives and work.

=== 2025 Puntland Military Offensive against the Islamic State militants in the Bari Mountains ===
Map of the 2025 Puntland offensive against the Islamic State

On 8 January 2025, the Puntland armed forces greatly increased their fight against Islamic State militants in the Al Miskat mountain range, located in the Bari region. These forces said they are working to block all escape routes and are closing in on areas where the militants are hiding. Puntland's Counter-Terrorism Operation said their troops are surrounding the Al Miskat mountains and moving into the suspected hideouts. Security operations are also happening in nearby areas like Hamure. The security force is also talked to local people and asked them to not collaborate with the militants. They warned residents to stay away from the group before it was too late.

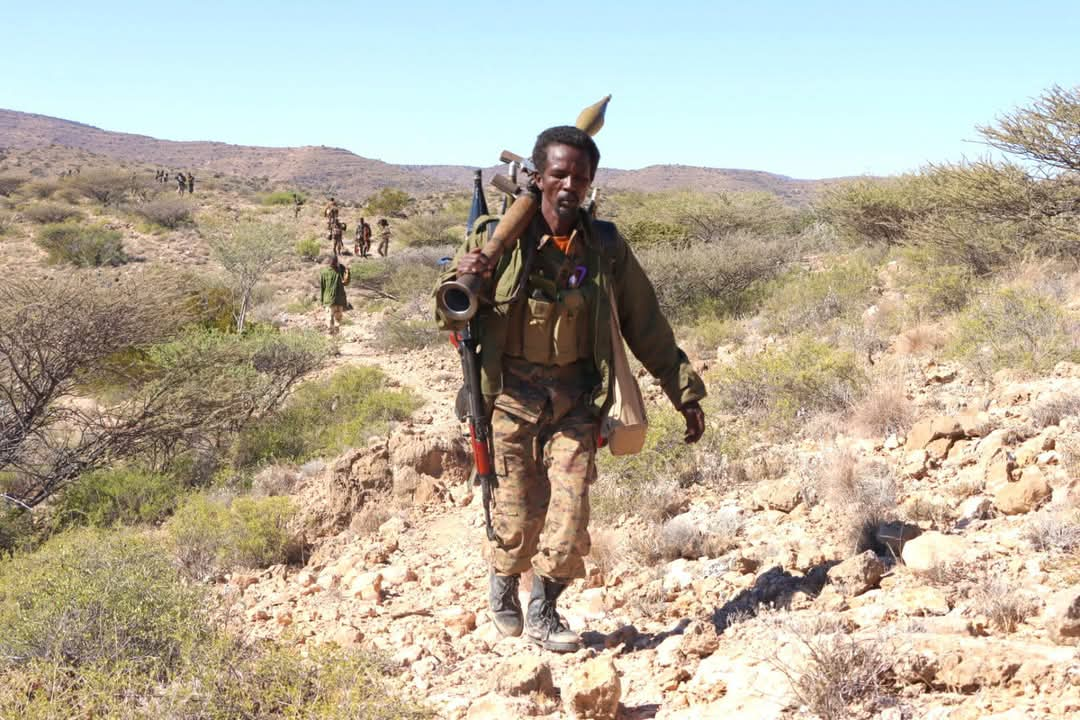
Puntland Security Force soldier with an RPG-7 during the campaign against ISS in the Calmiskaad Mountains of Bari region (Feb 2025)

On 9 January 2025, Puntland forces carry out drone strikes on Islamic State targets in the Cal Miskaad mountains near Balidhidhin District of Bari, The counterterrorism claimed that they killed of several militants.

After the aerial assaults, Puntland's counterterrorism forces captured four foreign Islamic State fighters from Ethiopia, Yemen, and Tanzania, while intercepting and destroying multiple explosive-carrying drones in Bari region.

=== Battle of Laba-Afle ===
On January 20, 2025, At least twenty people were killed, and over 10 others injured in two days of Laba-Afle battle between Islamic State militia members and Puntland armed forces near the Cal Miskat mountains of Bari region.

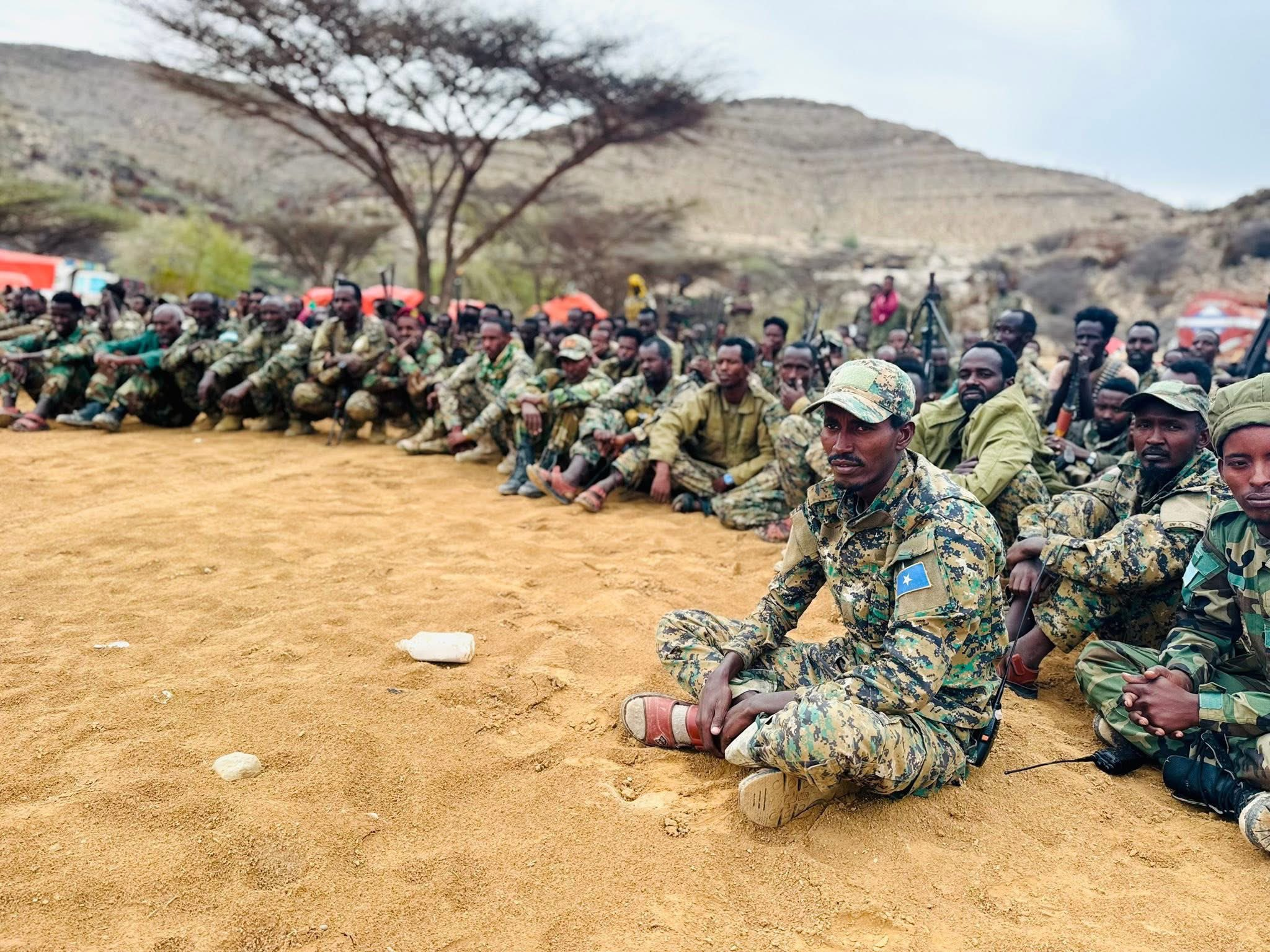
Puntland forces undergoing final preparations for phase three of the operations to eliminate Islamic States forces in the Almiskat mountains (April 2025)

Puntland counterterrorism unit operation's spokesperson, Brigadier General Mohamud Mohamed Ahmed, reported that fifteen IS militants and six Puntland soldiers died during the Sunday and Monday fighting. He added that IS fighters used improvised explosive devices (IEDs) to defend their hideouts near Balidhidin. A landmine explosion killed six soldiers and injured three others while they were clearing the area.

Ahmed also mentioned that Puntland forces killed eight IS militants during the operation, which extended into Monday.

== Reactions ==
On 23 January 2025, Puntland Vice President Ilyas Osman Lugatoor has accused Somali President Hassan Sheikh Mohamud’s administration of obstructing the evacuation of war casualties in the fight against ISIS. Speaking on Thursday, Ilyas criticized the federal government for hindering humanitarian operations instead of assisting Puntland’s counterterrorism efforts.

"We do not seek support from the federal government, as it has failed to assist us in combating ISIS. The most recent evacuation of injured personnel was blocked due to their refusal of consent," he alleged.

Ilyas further claimed that Puntland had received no share of international counterterrorism aid allocated to Somalia, despite its frontline role against ISIS. Highlighting Puntland's successes, he stated, "Over 65% of the territory previously controlled by ISIS has been reclaimed. Puntland does not and will not require external troops, whether from the federal government or elsewhere."

== Timeline ==
Approximate map of the current phase of the Somali Civil War (Updated June 2025) Somalia: Under control of the Federal Government of Somalia, the African Union Support and Stabilization Mission in Somalia, and the United States Under control of the Government of Puntland Under control of the Jubaland Dervish Force and the Raskamboni Movement Jihadist insurgent groups: Under presence/control of al-Qaeda-backed al-Shabaab and allies Under control of Islamic State-backed Somalia Wilayah Somaliland: Under control of the self-declared state of Somaliland (For a more detailed map of the current military situation, see here.)

=== January 2025 ===
- 1 January – Islamic State has publicly shared pictures of a suicide assault against Puntland, revealing that none of the attackers were Somali. The militants reported 12 perpetrators with nationalities and 7 country names. Included two Tanzanians, two natives of the Arabian peninsula, two Moroccans, and individuals from Libya, Tunisia, Yemen, and Ethiopia.
- 2 January – The Puntland armed forces claims to have conducted airstrikes on Islamic State hideouts in parts of the Cal Miskaad mountains of the Bari region.
- 9 January – Puntland armed forces carried out airstrikes on Islamic State positions in mountain regions of the Balidhidhin District. They also carried out an operation in which they arrested four foreign fighters who originated from Ethiopia, Yemen, and Tanzania, and destroyed several explosives-laden drones.
- 10 January – Puntland forces fight against ISIS in the IL-Ameira mountains, stopping seven drones loaded with bombs and removing ten landmines. The forces also destroy five ISIS bases. They capture military bases, including a water well in Jeceel Valley near Cal Miskaad mountains of Balidhidhin District, Bari, Puntland.
- 11 January – The Counterterrorism Forces of Puntland's disclosed a cave that was being used to store food by ISIS was captured by Puntland forces in Al-Miskad mountains, killed ISIS fighters and captured including foreigners and destroyed improvised explosive devices and hideouts, and downed three explosives-laden drones as the troops continued their thunder offensive against ISIS militants hiding in the remote areas of the Bari region, Puntland.
- 13 January – Twenty-six ISIS militants are reported killed, including a female combatant and two soldiers, and several others are injured when Puntland forces capture eight ISIS bases during ongoing offensive military operations in Bari.
- 15 January – Thousands of families are displaced as the military campaign intensifies, forcing locals to flee their homes in Bari region.
- 16 January – the Puntland Security Force (PSF) claimed to have captured a training facility used by ISIS militants, with over forty ISIS fighters allegedly killed following heavy fighting.
- 16 January – for the first time since the start of the campaign, the Islamic State dedicated a section to the conflict in Puntland in its weekly newspaper, al-Naba. Part of the article denied the Islamic State lost 20 men, and mocked the Puntland government by accusing it of fabricating 'Imaginary victories'.
- 22 January – Puntland mobilized a helicopter to support its current campaign against the Islamic State, aiding in supply transport and medical evacuations in the state's rugged terrain. The aircraft will deliver essential supplies, including medicine, to frontline soldiers in naturally impassable areas. Officials have not disclosed the helicopter's origin.
- 23 January:
  - Puntland authorities ban illegal foreign entries and direct telecom firms to deactivate SIM cards linked to undocumented individuals and Islamic State operatives, aiming to disrupt the group's financial networks amidst ongoing anti-IS offensives by Puntland forces.
  - Puntland's highest military court sentences two influencers to prison terms in absentia for promoting Islamic State propaganda and spreading disinformation intended at discrediting Puntland forces' ongoing operations.
  - At least four civilians are killed in an airstrike by an unknown combat drone in the Sihan area of Qandala district in Puntland's Bari region.
- 24 January – at least thirteen Islamic State militants were killed in heavy fighting as Puntland forces claimed that they successfully took over the towns of Turmasaale and Janno-Jiifta in the Bari region.
- 29 January – Puntland deports around a thousand undocumented Ethiopians from Bosaso, Galkayo, Qardho and the state's capital, Garoowe, as part of an ongoing crackdown on foreigners without legal status, following the discovery of foreign fighters acting as Islamic State recruiters in the Cal Miskaad mountains.

=== February 2025 ===
- 1 February:
  - U.S. President Donald Trump orders the military to carry out airstrikes against Islamic State positions in Somalia. Ten strikes targeted a series of cave systems used by the militant group.
  - This airstrike was later Puntland spokesperson confirmed to have killed ISIS leader, the deputy of Abdul Qadir Mumin, Abdirahman Fahiye Isse Mohamud, the head of the group's training and Ahmed Maeleminine, a key recruiter and financier for the militant group.
- 2 February – Puntland military officials claimed that the U.S. airstrikes against the Islamic State have killed 46 fighters in the Al-Miskad mountains, a remote area in the Bari Region.
- 3 February:
  - Puntland police spokesperson confirms that a senior commander of the Islamic State, Abdirahman Shirwac Aw-Said, the head of the group's assassination squad, surrendered to Puntland forces.
  - Puntland Maritime Police Force seize a boat carrying illegal military supplies, uniforms and equipment. The vessel was taken captive off the coast of the Qaw district in the Bari Region.
- 5 February – A deadly battle between the Puntland Security Force and Islamic State results in the killing of 57 foreign militants in Dharin area of Bari Region.
- 10 February – Puntland forces announce that, over the past 24 hours, airstrikes targeting Islamic State hideouts have killed more than 13 foreign militants in the Dhasaq area of Bari Region.
- 11 February – In fighting around the Togga Jacel area of the Cal Miskaad mountains in Puntland's Bari Region, at least 27 Puntland soldiers and more than 70 Islamic State militants mainly foreign fighters were killed and many more wounded. This is the deadliest attack since Puntland launched an offensive in December 2024 against Islamic State-Somalia hideouts in the Golis Mountains.
- 13 February – Two Airstrikes conducted by The U.S. Africa Command (AFRICOM) killed 30 ISIS militants in Al-Miskad mountain ranges in Bari region.
- 16 February – Two ISIS militants were killed in an US airstrike in Al-Miskad mountain range in Bari region.
- 17 February:
  - In a coordinated operation in Puntland, the United States and the United Arab Emirates launch airstrikes targeting ISIS militants in the Bari Region killing 16 militants. This marks the second United States strike since February 1, following the United Arab Emirates's earlier attack which resulted in the deaths of dozens of militants.
  - 17 February – A spokesperson for security operations in the Puntland region, Brigadier General Mohamud Mohamed Ahmed confirmed that the UAE and United States had targeted Godka Kunle and Xankookin, two villages with known IS-SP activity.
- 23 February – At least three ISIS fighters were killed in a joint Puntland armed forces and USAFRICOM airstrike targeting ISIS militants hiding in the Cal Miskaad mountains of the Bari Region of Puntland.
- 24 February – Puntland forces capture key locations, including Dararmadobe, Uraar and the Four Corners of Mountains in Gaatir Oodan, which have served as command and defense bases for the Islamic State militias. Troops uncover mass graves, including the bodies of senior Middle East ISIS members killed in UAE and US airstrikes. Vehicles and motorbikes rigged with explosives were found in the Cal Miskaad mountains of Puntland's Bari Region.

=== March 2025 ===
- 1 March – The Puntland Dervish Force captures an ISIS base in Buqa Caleed, in the Cal Miskaad mountain range of Bari Region, Puntland.
- 7 March – The United States Army stationed in Puntland's Bari region continues to maintain its operations and will not pull out of the region in response to double ongoing Puntland anti-ISIS campaign.
- 10 March – United Arab Emirates carried out deadly airstrikes, leaving an unknown number of fleeing ISIS militants regrouping their positions in the Miiraale Valley in Puntland's Cal Miskaad mountain ranges of Bari region.
- 13 March – Puntland forces kill a senior foreign ISIS commander responsible for orchestrating drone attacks using explosive-laden unmanned aerial vehicles in the Lugta-Huraanhur and Togga Raq-Raq valleys of the Cal Miskaad Mountains in the Bari region of Puntland.

=== May 2025 ===
- 31 May: Puntland Security forces captured the Mirale valley and many bases killing 15 ISIS militants in Bari region.

=== June 2025 ===
- June 4: Puntland's elite security forces killed over 35 ISIS militants, including several foreign fighters, in a major military operation conducted in the mountainous rural areas between Miraale and Balade in the Bari region of Puntland. The troops also destroyed weapons caches and military equipment used by the group.
- June 14: Puntland Security Forces have captured a Foreign ISIS militant for the first time since the start of the new offensive, the man captured is of Turkish identity. The Armed forces also announced the capture the settlements of Sadow, Cadalle and Raa-raha valley in the Caal Miskaad Mountain range.
- June 16: Puntland Security Forces announced the capture of 98% of Cakmiskaad mountain range back from ISIS militants. They also announced the start of the Fourth Phase of Operation Hilaac.
- June 18: Puntland Security Forces have captured the remaining positions of ISIS militants in Baallade valley. Most of the Militants were killed in the attack but some managed to flee.

=== August 2025 ===
- August 1: Two foreign ISIS militants were arrested by Puntland Forces in Kalabayr in Bari region.
- August 4: A commander of Puntland Security Forces was killed in an roadside bomb planted by suspected ISIS militants.
- August 20: Puntland security forces have they have killed more 700 foreign fighters from eight months of battle.
- August 22: Puntland security forces have successfully captured areas of Yucrin and Maraagade following a planned operation in Togga Baallade mountainous part of Cal Miskaad.
- August 25 – Heavy fighting ensued in Baallade valley which is an ISIS stronghold, clashes resulted in 20 Puntland soldiers killed and 30 injured and dozens of ISIS militants were also killed.
- August 27 – Puntland Forces captured the Ceelka Idakacab settlement in the Baallade Valley from ISIS militants.
- August 30 – Puntland forces thwarts multiple suicide attacks against its troops and bases killing 6 ISIS militants but a successful attack resulted in death of 23 Puntland soldiers.

=== November 2025 ===
- 12 November – Puntland Security forces killed in an ISIS bomb expert while he was trying to plant landmines in Baalade valley, Puntland.
- 17 November – ISIS suicide bombers tried to attack a Security camp in Miraale valley, Puntland forces killed four ISIS militants but lost three security personnel in the attack.
- 20 November – Puntland Forces have besieged the last ISIS stronghold in Puntland, the area located is a mountainous terrain located in Baalade valley.
- 27 November – US special forces and Puntland forces performed joint operations and a US airstrike in a cave hideout in Balade valley killed a Senior ISIS leader along with 15 other militants.
