= List of wars involving Somalia =

This is a list of military conflicts in which Somali armed forces participated in after independence.

Somalia defeat
Somalia victory
Another result (e.g. a treaty or peace without a clear result, result unknown or indecisive)
Ongoing conflict

Date	Conflict	Allies	Enemies	Result
1285-1286	Ifat invasion of Shewa Sultanate	Sultanate of Ifat	Sultanate of shewa	Victory: Gidaya, Dawaro, Sawans, Bali, and Fatagar incorporated into the Ifat Sultanate.
1507-1542	Somali–Portuguese conflicts	Ajuran Sultanate	Portuguese Empire	Victory
1529-1543	Ethiopian–Adal War	Adal Sultanate	Ethiopian Empire	Victory
1874–1885	Egyptian invasion of Hararghe	Emirate of Harar: Oromos; Sultanate of Aussa: Afar people	Khedivate of Egypt	Defeat: Emirate of Harar occupied by Egypt.
1886-1908	Lafoole Masscre	Somalis	Italian Empire	Victory
1900–1920	Somaliland Campaign	Dervish State; Supported by: Ottoman Empire; German Empire (1915-1916)	British Empire; Ethiopian Empire (1900-1904); Italian Empire	Defeat: Collapse of Dervish movement; Consolidation of British Somaliland; Consolidation of Italian Somaliland
1922	1922 Burao tax revolt	Somalia	British Empire	Victory
1963–1967	Shifta War	Northern Frontier District Liberation Movement; Supported by: (Somalia) Somali Republic	Kenya; Supported by: United Kingdom	Cease-fire: Protectorate Tax Policy abandoned
1964	1964 Ethiopian–Somali Border War	(Somalia) Somalia; Supported by: (United Arab Republic) Egypt	(Ethiopian Empire) Ethiopia; Supported by: United States	Cease-fire: Return to status quo ante bellum
1977–1978	Ogaden War	Somalia; WSLF; Supported by: Egypt; Saudi Arabia; Iraq	Ethiopia; Cuba; Soviet Union; South Yemen; Supported by: Israel; East Germany; North Korea	Defeat: Somalia breaks all ties with the Soviet Bloc (except China and Romania).; Beginning of the Somali Rebellion
1982	1982 Ethiopian–Somali Border War	Somalia; Supported by: United States	Ethiopia	Somalia victory: Ethiopian invasion halted; Ethiopia occupies the border towns of Galdogob and Balanbale until 1988; The United States delivers emergency military and economic aid to Somalia
1993	Operation Gothic Serpent	Somalia	United States; United Nations	Victory: UNOSOM II Tactical Victory; Somali National AllianceStrategic Victory
2009–present	Somali Civil War (2009–present)	Somalia; Somali Armed Forces; Regional forces: Galmudug; Galmudug Security Force; Ahlu Sunna Waljama'a (until 2018); (Somalia) Ma'awisley; Hirshabelle; Khatumo; Southwestern Somalia; Himan and Heeb (until 2015); United States: U.S. Army; U.S. Marine Corps; U.S. Air Force; U.S. Navy; CIA; AFRICOM; China: People's Armed Police; Turkey: Turkish Land Forces; AUSSOM (2025–present): Burundi (under discussion); Djibouti; Egypt (under discussion); Ethiopia; Kenya; Uganda; ATMIS (2022–2024): Burundi; Djibouti; Ethiopia; Kenya; Uganda; AMISOM (2007–2022): Burundi; Djibouti; Ethiopia; Ghana; Kenya; Nigeria; Sierra Leone; Uganda; Supported by: France; Italy; Russia; UAE; United Kingdom Non-combat support: European Union; EUTM Somalia; (United Nations) UNPOS (1995–2013) (United Nations) UNSOM (2013–2024): Brazil; Finland; Germany; Ghana; India; Indonesia; Nepal; Sierra Leone; Sweden; Thailand; Turkey; Uganda; United Kingdom; Zimbabwe; (United Nations) UNTMIS (2025–present) (United Nations) UNSOA (2009–2016) (United Nations) UNSOS (2016–present) Independent regional forces Puntland: Puntland Security Force; Puntland Dervish Force; Puntland Maritime Police Force; Jubaland: Jubaland Dervish Force; Raskamboni Movement	Al-Qaeda and allies; Al-Shabaab; AQAP; AQIM; Hizbul Islam (until 2010; 2012–2013) Alleged state allies: Eritrea; Iran; Quds Force; Qatar; Alleged non-state allies: Houthis; Somali pirates: Islamic State (since 2015); Somalia Wilayah; Allies; IS-YP; Somali pirates: Somaliland; Somaliland Armed Forces; SSB; Alleged support: Ethiopia; United Arab Emirates	Ongoing: Merger and split between/of Hizbul Islam and al-Shabaab forces; Kenyan military intervention in October 2011; Al-Shabaab becomes an official al-Qaeda affiliate in February 2012; Federal Government formed in August 2012; Formation of the Islamic State in Somalia in October 2015; Somali government launches a major offensive in August 2022, and takes at least a third of al-Shabaab territory; Las Anod conflict between Somaliland and SSC-Khatumo begins in 2023; Ongoing constitutional crisis in Somalia since 2023, Puntland withdrew its recognition of the Federal Government and declared itself a de facto independent state. Jubaland crisis ongoing since 11 December 2024
