= Puntland counter-terrorism operations =

Current military operation in Puntland

- Part of the War against the Islamic State and Islamic State insurgency in Puntland
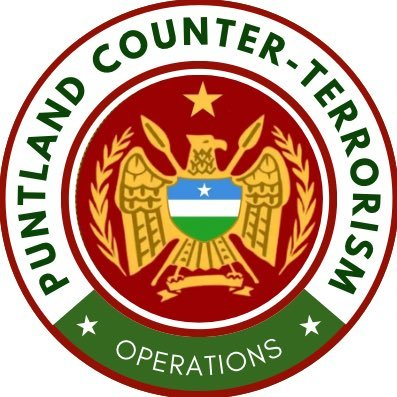
- Operational scope: Military offensives
- Type: Ground force
- Location: Cal Miskaad, Bari region, Puntland; 10°47′05.1″N 49°46′05″E
- Planned by: Government of Puntland
- Commanded by: Said Abdullahi Deni
- Objective: Anti-terrorism
- Date: Began 26 November 2024 –
- Executed by: Puntland armed forces: Puntland Security Force; Puntland Dervish Force; Puntland Maritime Police Force; Unit of Counter-Terrorism; Puntland Police Force; United States Armed Forces; United States Army; United States Navy; DEVGRU; United States Air Force; AFRICOM; United Arab Emirates Armed Forces; United Arab Emirates Air Force
- Location of Cal Miskaad, Bari region

The Puntland counter-terrorism operations (Somali: Hawlgalka Ciribtirka Argagixisada ee Puntland), codenamed Operation Hilaac, is a large-scale military offensive launched by the Puntland regional forces in November 2024 against both ISIS and al-Shabaab militants. This semi-autonomous state of Puntland declared the major offensive, which is being led by Puntland Security Force, Puntland Dervish Force, and Puntland Maritime Police Force, with support from the United States Africa Command. The operation targets the Islamic State–Somalia in Cal Miskaad of Bari region. It marks the first military offensive by Puntland forces since the Qandala campaign in 2016.

== Background ==
Islamic State Somalia is a militant group linked to the larger Islamic State network. It operates mainly in Somalia but has also expanded to other parts of the world.

IS–Somalia raises money to support its operations in the Horn of Africa. The International Crisis Group (ICG) reported in September 2024 that IS–Somalia is successfully gathering and distributing funds across its network.

According to ICG IS–Somalia has become more powerful in recent years. Some reports suggest that its leader might now be the global head of the Islamic State, but this has not been confirmed. The militant has increased its recruitment worldwide and is involved in funding terrorist activities in different countries.

In May 2024, IS–Somalia was linked to an attack on the Israeli embassy in Sweden. Authorities in the United States also arrested a Somali American for inciting terrorism in New York.

Although smaller than al-Shabaab in southern Somalia, IS–Somalia has doubled in size within Somalia in 2024. The commander of the U.S. Africa Command, General Michael Langley, has warned that IS–Somalia is increasing its numbers, especially in northern Somalia.

For months, clashes between al-Shabaab and ISIS have intensified, including the use of IEDs and direct combat. While Puntland has been closely monitored, ISIS has managed to reduce al-Shabaab's influence in the mountains. Puntland has historically shown strong defenses against insurgents, such as when its forces defeated an al-Shabaab coastal attack in 2016, inflicting heavy casualties within a week.

== Puntland preparations ==
Puntland had mobilized ten thousand troops for a major operation targeting ISIS strongholds in the Cal Miskaad part of the Golis mountain ranges. These areas have long been a refuge for ISIS in Somalia, where they can regroup and recruit fighters.

Puntland is taking a different approach to fighting terrorism than the national Somali government.

Puntland had broken off ties with the national government since last March. Ever since starting its full-scale "hilaac" (or "lightning") offensive in December 2024, Puntland claims its forces have captured 48 caves and Islamic State outposts, and have destroyed dozens of drones and explosive devices.

=== Women's role ===
Puntland's armed forces have been successfully conducting operations against the Islamic State in Somalia, which has taken refuge in the Cal Miskaad mountains of the Bari region. Various sections of society are actively supporting the armed forces in their efforts.

Women are among the community groups providing assistance. Kaafi Ali Jirde, the chairperson of the Bari Regional Women's Association, told VOA;

Women are preparing and supplying dry food and cooked meals for soldiers on the frontlines. Some women have joined the frontlines wearing armored vests, while others have participated as nurses, providing medical assistance to wounded troops

— VOA Somali

== First phase ==
On 31 December 2024, Puntland forces successfully repelled an Islamic State attack on a military base in Dharjaale. This marked the first large-scale and sophisticated assault by ISIS in Somalia. The attack involved several foreign suicide bombers and Puntland forces killed at least twelve militants. President Said Abdullahi Deni played an active role in the preparation for the operation, meeting with security officials in Bossaso.

== Second phase ==
Map of the 2025 Puntland offensive against the Islamic State

Puntland deployed 500 elite soldiers from its defense forces and have graduated after months of intensive training, specifically for mountain and asymmetric warfare fully equipped with advanced technology to counter ISIS tactics, including anti-drone and IED jammers.

After a month of fighting in the first phase, Puntland launched the second phase of its operations against ISIS in Cal Miskaad Mountains of the Bari region. The second phase began with intense ground combat, and the U.S. military conducted an airstrike in the mountains.

On 1 February 2025, U.S. President Donald Trump ordered the military to carry out airstrikes against Islamic State positions in Golis Mountains in northern Somalia, targeting a series of cave systems used by the group.

On 2 February, Puntland military spokesperson claimed that U.S. airstrikes against ISIL had killed 46 fighters in the Cal Miskaad Mountains's remote area. On 3 February, Puntland police spokesperson confirmed that a senior commander of the Islamic State, Abdirahman Shirwac Aw-Said, the head of the group's assassination squad, surrendered to Puntland forces.

On 10 February, Puntland forces announced that, over the past 24 hours, airstrikes targeting Islamic State hideouts had killed more than 13 foreign militants in the Dhasaq area of Bari region.

== Third phase ==
=== Puntland Launches Final Phase of Anti-ISIS Campaign ===
Puntland President Said Abdullahi Deni has announced the third and final phase of the Hillaac Campaign, aiming to eliminate ISIS militants hiding in remote mountain areas. The operation will focus on clearing out remaining fighters using air and ground forces.

President Deni has also announced a limited-time amnesty for individuals who previously supported or collaborated with ISIS, as part of the third phase of the Hillaac Campaign. Those who surrender and seek pardon within seven days will be granted forgiveness and a chance to reintegrate into society.

Approximate map of the current phase of the Somali Civil War (Updated June 2025) Somalia: Under control of the Federal Government of Somalia, the African Union Support and Stabilization Mission in Somalia, and the United States Under control of the Government of Puntland Under control of the Jubaland Dervish Force and the Raskamboni Movement Jihadist insurgent groups: Under presence/control of al-Qaeda-backed al-Shabaab and allies Under control of Islamic State-backed Somalia Wilayah Somaliland: Under control of the self-declared state of Somaliland (For a more detailed map of the current military situation, see here.)

== Fourth Phase ==
=== Operation Onkod: Removing the Final Pockets of ISIS Cells ===
On 15 June 2025, Puntland president announced he is starting the Fourth phase of the operation in which they aim to kill and capture the remaining pockets of ISIS cells presumably hiding in the mountain terrain as most of the territory has been recaptured the Puntland Forces. He also announced that 98% of Cal Miskaad mountain range which once was the headquarters and stronghold of the Militants was recaptured.

Around July 2025, the offensive had slowed following the withdrawal of government forces from the Miraale Valley, which enabled ISIS militants to plant landmines and disrupt supply routes.

On 9 August 2025, the Puntland administration deployed troops to the Habley area, advancing toward suspected militant hideouts. Puntland forces also targeted ISIS positions in the mountains with sustained artillery fire. According to security sources, the group is now concentrated in two remote and difficult-to-access areas: the Habley Mountains and the Baallade Valley, both lacking adequate roads for logistics and resupply. Analysts estimate that more than 100 fighters, including senior leaders, remain entrenched in these mountainous areas. Security officials have indicated that the operation could continue until September.

== Military units involved ==
=== Puntland armed forces ===
- Puntland Defense Forces
- Puntland Security Force
- Puntland Maritime Police Force
- Puntland Dervish Force

=== Intelligence ===
- Puntland Intelligence Security Agency

=== Police forces ===
- Puntland Police Force
- Counter-Terrorist Unit
  - Special Anti-Terrorist Unit (Puntland)

=== United States ===
- United States Armed Forces
- United States Africa Command

=== United Arab Emirates ===
- United Arab Emirates Air Force

== See also ==
- Islamic State insurgency in Puntland (2024–)
- Qandala campaign (2016)
- Galgala campaign (2014)
