= Qandala campaign =

2016 battle in northern Somalia

- Part of the War against the Islamic State, Islamic State insurgency in Puntland and the Somali Civil War
- An ISS fighter hoists his group's flag over Qandala on the same building where Somali folk hero Ali Fahiye Gedi was imprisoned during the colonial era.
Date	26 October – 18 December 2016 (1 month, 3 weeks and 1 day)
Location	Qandala, Bari, Somalia
Result	Tactical Puntland victory; major ISS propaganda success

Belligerents
Islamic State; Islamic State – Somalia Province	Puntland

Commanders and leaders
Sheikh Abdul Qadir Mumin (leader of ISS); Mahad Maoallim (ISS senior commander)	Shire Haji Farah (Minister of Planning and International Relations); Yusuf Mohamed Dhedo (Bari region governor); Admiral Abdirizak Dirie Farah (Puntland Maritime Police commander)

Units involved
Military of the Islamic State	Puntland Security Force; Puntland Dervish Force; Puntland Police Force; Puntland Maritime Police Force; Clan militias

Strength
Unknown (Note: Qandala was initially captured by around 60 ISS fighters, but the number of militants who defended the town during the government counter-offensive is completely unknown. Overall, ISS is estimated to have 100 to 300 fighters.)	(Puntland) "Hundreds" of fighters, several gunboats

Casualties and losses
30 killed, 35 wounded, several captured (government claim)	3+ wounded
- 25,700+ displaced

The Qandala campaign began when the Islamic State in Somalia (ISS) attacked and captured the town of Qandala in Bari, Puntland, Somalia on 26 October 2016. This takeover resulted in the displacement of over 25,700 civilians and an eventual counter-offensive by the Puntland Security Force, which succeeded in driving ISS from Qandala on 7 December, and thereafter government units continued to attack the militants' hideouts in the nearby mountains until 18 December. The fall of Qandala was the second time that an Islamic State of Iraq and the Levant (ISIL)-affiliated group had captured a town in Somalia, but whereas the first takeover had lasted only for a very short time, ISS had managed to hold Qandala, a town of both major strategic as well as symbolic importance, for over a month.

== Background ==
When Abdul Qadir Mumin broke away from al-Shabaab and declared allegiance to ISIL in 2015, only about 20 of the 300 Islamist fighters based in Puntland joined him. Over the following year he and his followers evaded attacks by al-Shabaab militants and recruited new members; by October 2016, it was assumed that Abdul Qadir Mumin's group had significantly grown to about 300 fighters. Thus, as the first anniversary of the ISS' foundation grew near, they sought a target for their first major attack. In this regard, Qandala would be a convenient target, as Mumin's clan lived near the town, and the conquest of a significant settlement as well as the proclamation of an Islamic region in the whole of Africa could gain him more local support and sympathizers.

Furthermore, Qandala is a town of both strategic as well as symbolic significance: It is generally known that the ISS receives experts, trainers, money, weapons and other materials from its allies in Yemen. ISS is active in areas, however, that are very mountainous and difficult to reach by land, so that they are generally supplied by sea; in this regard, the possession of a port town like Qandala would allow them to receive more shipments of supplies. Conversely, Qandala is "a traditional symbol of staunch resistance to foreign occupation", as it was the site where the Somali rebel and folk hero Ali Fahiye Gedi burned the Italian flag and was subsequently imprisoned by Italian soldiers in 1914.

== Campaign ==
=== ISS capture of Qandala ===
On early 26 October, ISS militants began their surprise attack against Qandala, cutting the town's phone lines while encountering little resistance. As Qandala was defended only by a very small number of soldiers, who were unable to stop the Islamic State fighters, all government officials and soldiers soon fled Qandala. Thereupon 60 ISS militants entered the town and captured it without further fighting, hoisting their flag on top of the police station and the building where Ali Fahiye Gedi had been imprisoned. Even though the jihadists tried to reassure the local population by telling them "don't panic, we will rule you according to the Islamic sharia (law)", Qandala's elders asked them to leave, to which the militants insisted that "they are not going anywhere".

On the next day, Qandala's schools closed, and for the first time in the town's history, thousands of its residents fled by boat and on foot to Bosaso, while the Puntland Maritime Police Force deployed several gunboats to intercept any shipments by militant groups from Yemen. Puntland officials also claimed that ISS began to retreat from the town, though these reports were later disproven by locals. By 23 November, all civilian residents of Qandala had fled; overall 25,700 locals had been displaced due to the ISS takeover. Meanwhile, the town's ISS garrison began to erect defences around the town to prepare for the inevitable government counter-offensive.

=== Puntland's counter-offensive ===
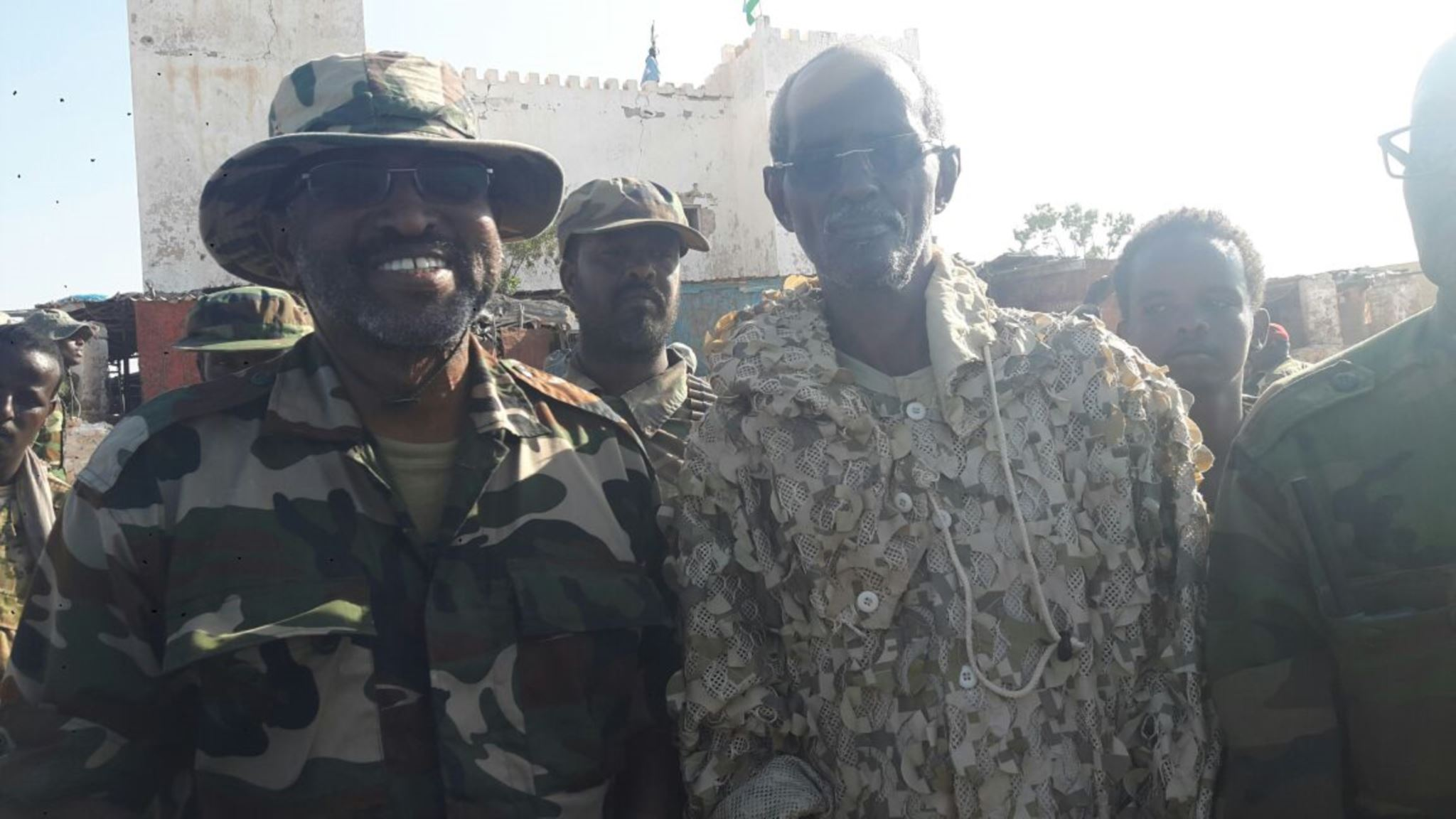
The two leaders of the government counter-offensive, Shire Haji Farah and Yusuf Mohamed Dhedo, at Qandala after the town's recapture from ISS on 7 December 2016.

The Puntland Security Force began their counter-offensive on 3 December, though their forces were hindered by the difficult terrain around Qandala and narrow roads that led to the town. Government soldiers encountered first resistance at the village of Bashashin, when they were forced to stop in order to dismantle landmines that had been placed on the road that ran through the village. At that moment, ISS militants launched a surprise attack, though the Puntland forces eventually repelled the assault. Another major skirmish happened on 5 December; besides these two battles, the fighting was mostly sporadic, though it lasted until 7 December. On that day, the Puntland forces entered Qandala by land and sea, encountering no resistance; ISS had evacuated its forces from the town beforehand and subsequently retreated to Gurur in the mountainous areas to the south.

On 18 December, Puntland police forces reportedly attacked and destroyed an ISS base at El Ladid, a village 30 kilometers south of Qandala, where the rebels were regrouping after their retreat.

== Aftermath ==
Though ISS had ultimately lost all captured territory and if government sources are to be believed, suffered heavy casualties, the fact that the small local ISIL branch had captured a major town and held it for over a month "could be viewed as an important symbolic victory for the group".

== Bibliography ==
- Warner, Jason (2017). "Sub-Saharan Africa's Three "New" Islamic State Affiliates" (PDF). CTC Sentinel. 10 (1). West Point, New York: Combating Terrorism Center: 28–32. Archived from the original (PDF) on 2017-04-30.
