= Al-Qaeda in the Lands of the Two Niles =

Islamist militant organization in Sudan

Al-Qaeda in the Land of Two Niles
- Founder: Osama bin Laden
- Dates active: 1990s-2013
- Country: Sudan
- Ideology: Salafi jihadism
- Part of: Al-Qaeda

Al-Qaeda in the Lands of the Two Niles (Arabic: تنظيم القاعدة في بلاد النيلين), abbreviated as AQTN, was a lesser-known regional offshoot of the broader al-Qaeda network, operating primarily in Sudan and neighbouring areas. Its origins can be traced back to the early 1990s when Osama bin Laden, the founder of al-Qaeda, resided in Sudan. During his stay, bin Laden formed alliances with local Islamist factions and established training camps, laying the groundwork for a lasting militant presence in the region. Although bin Laden left Sudan in 1996, these early ties helped foster the development of AQTN.

AQTN's activities are characterised by their connection to both local and international jihadist movements. The group has sought to exploit Sudan's ongoing conflicts, particularly in Darfur and the Nuba Mountains, to recruit fighters and establish safe havens. Sudan's political instability and porous borders have provided AQTN with opportunities to sustain its operations and align itself with other militant factions, such as al-Qaeda in the Arabian Peninsula (AQAP) and al-Shabaab in Somalia. However, AQTN has remained a relatively low-profile organisation compared to other al-Qaeda affiliates, with fewer high-profile attacks attributed to it.

Despite its lower visibility, AQTN plays a strategic role in al-Qaeda's regional ambitions, particularly by acting as a logistical hub and providing ideological support for jihadist movements in East Africa. The group's presence in Sudan is also significant in light of the country's historical ties to Islamist militancy, though the current Sudanese government has sought to distance itself from these networks in recent years. AQTN's future remains uncertain, particularly as the dynamics of regional conflicts continue to shift.

Al-Salamah Group, part of the AQTN broader network, group attempted to carry out bombings in Khartoum in August 2007, targeting sites in the city's southern suburb. While the group succeeded in detonating at least one bomb, Sudanese authorities quickly dismantled the network. Mohamed Makkawi Ibrahim, on of the preparator. managed to evade capture during the crackdown and fled to the Darfur region, where he continued his involvement in jihadist activities. In January 2008, Makkawi and three associates carried out the assassination of John Granville, an American USAID official, and his Sudanese driver, Abdelrahman Abbas Rahama, in Khartoum.

Other known leaders include Abu Hudhayfah al Sudani, and Abu Talha al-Sudani.

In 2013, and after the killing of Osama bin Laden, he was mourned in Sudan by AQTN and al-Qaeda sympathisers.

== See also ==
- Al-Bara' ibn Malik Battalion – Sudanese Islamist militia
- Ibrahim al Qosi – Sudanese al-Qaeda member
- Jamal al-Fadl – Sudanese former Al-Qaeda member (born 1963)
