= Abshir Abdi Jama =

Former chief of Puntland Dervish Force

Major General Gen. Abshir Abdi Jama (London)
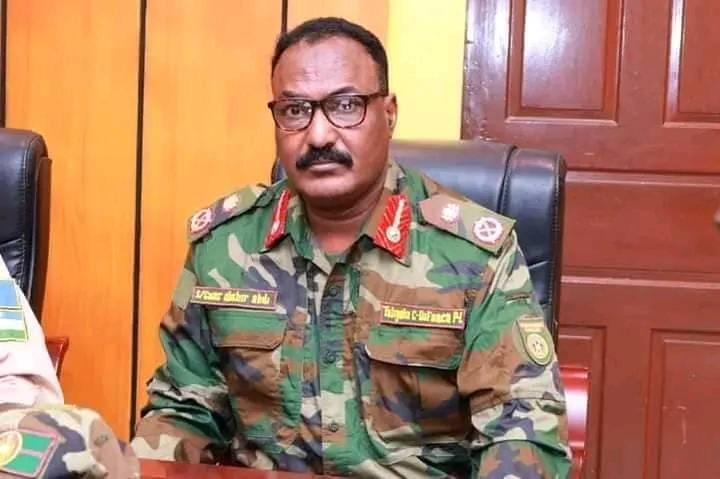
- London in 2022

Chief of Puntland Dervish Force
- In office September 2022 – October 2023
- Appointed by: Said Abdullahi Deni
- Preceded by: General Yasin Omar (Dhere)
- Succeeded by: General Adan Abdi Hashi

Personal details
- Party: Independent

Military service
- Rank: Major General

Abshir Abdi Jama Mohamed (Somali: Abshir Cabdi Jaamac Maxamed, Arabic:أبشر عبدي جامع محمد), also known as Abshir London, is a Somali military officer who served as the commander in chief of Puntland Dervish Force from 2022 to 2023.

== Chief Commander of Puntland Dervish Force ==
General Abshir London was named the Commander of the Puntland Dervish Force by Puntland President Said Abdulaahi Deni in August 2022. The move was as a result of a security leadership change aimed at filling the position of the outgoing commander, General Yasin Umar Dhere. His mandate was to command and manage operations of the Puntland Dervish Force. The Puntland Dervish Force is considered to be the major security force of the regional administration in the administrative division of Puntland.

General London, in his first term, reported to the president, Deni, on the upgrading of the headquarters command and the improvement of training and equipment of military forces. His leadership emphasized the continuation of the current reforms and capacity building of Puntland's forces within the larger policy of the Puntland administration.

Abshir London used strong rhetoric against the Republic of Somaliland and declared that the government there was a 'haven and supporter of terrorism' and that there was evidence of hostile activities inimical to the security of Somalia. In speeches with soldiers near the disputed zones, he mentioned fighting under the common Somali national flag and resisting policies that he perceived as supporting secession or against the unity of Somalis. These were expressions of a politically assertive policy concerning territory and unity questions in the Horn, though in fact, it was also depicted by very inflammatory language that irritated relations with Somaliland.

In mid-2023, there were reports suggesting that the relationship between Abshir London and the Puntland presidency had soured. There was government action placing him on leave/suspension as he was outside of the country and his salary had been stopped prior to the suspension. There were further allegations that weapons and materials had been removed from his residence by security forces, reflecting a conflict within himself regarding command and control. All this suggests that his term was marked by turbulence with civil authorities, perhaps in connection with command methods or administrative matters, though specific government reports remained scant.

== See also ==
- Puntland counter-terrorism operations – Current military operation in Puntland
