= Bandar Siyada =

Qaw Bandar Siyada
- Populated place
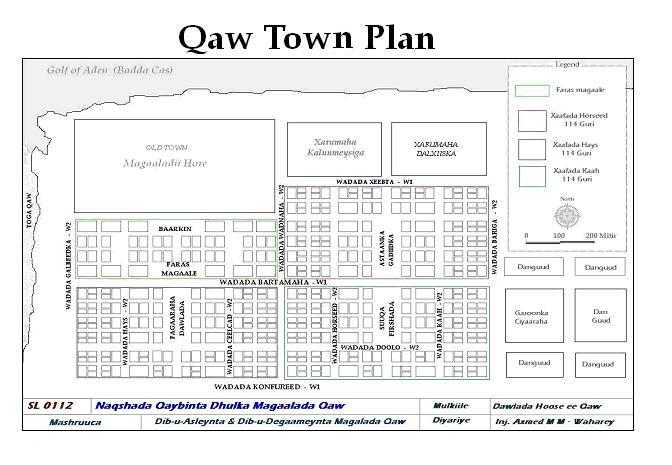
- Town plan for Qaw (Bandar Siyada)

- Location in Somalia
- Coordinates: 11°14′34″N 48°58′33″E
- Country: Somalia
- Region: Bari
- Elevation: 8 m (26 ft)
- Time zone: UTC+3 (EAT)

Qaw (Somali: Qaw), also known as Bandar Siyada, is a populated place in the northeastern Bari region of Somalia.

Qaw is situated in the Bosaso District of the autonomous Puntland region. The town was founded by the subclan of the Majeerteen. Wabeeneeye It hosts the main base of the Puntland Maritime Police Force.

For a while after the Somali civil war, it became a hub for smuggling, but since the establishment of the Puntland base in 2010, it has been relatively stable.

== History ==
=== Before Somalian independence ===
The main inhabitants of Bandar Siyada are the Somali Majeerteen clan. Prior to Somalia's independence, the Majeerteen. The Wabeeneeye clan lives this city.

The book La Migiurtinia Ed Il Territorio Del Nugál says the following about Qaw in early 1925: "The population is made up of majerteen specifically Wabeeneeye clan. The Wabeneya are divided into 2 reer Ahmed and reer Cali. The population of Bandar Siyada amounts to approximately 11,000 people.

In 1948, the British government proposed to the Italian government that Bandar Siyada should be included in British Somaliland, which was supported by the United States and France. But the Soviet Union government rejected the proposal, claiming that the Italian government had already relinquished its rights to the land.

=== After the Somali Civil War ===
In 1991, when the Barre regime collapsed, the Islamic militant group Al-Itihaad al-Islamiya(AIAI) rose up in the southern Somali port city of Kismayo, Hawiye and Jibraahiil war but was defeated by the Aidid warlords who had overthrown the Barre regime and moved their base to Bandar Siyada. From there, AIAI expanded its power throughout Somalia, especially in southern Somalia.

In June 1992, AIAI attacked the largest force in northeastern Somalia, the Somali Salvation Democratic Front (the predecessor of Puntland), and at one point captured the port of Bosaso, but was quickly repulsed and withdrew to Las Khorey, west of Bandar Siyada.

In 1999, Bosaso police stepped up their crackdown on the illegal transportation of migrants, drugs, and ammunition between Bandar Siyada and Mareero and Yemen, and seized two boats carrying ammunition and other cargo.

According to a 2006 report, Bandar Siyada was considered an export center for human trafficking to Yemen. As such, Puntland police have stepped up their crackdown.

In March 2008, a map produced by the United Nations High Commissioner for Refugees (UNHCR) lists Bandar Siyada as a smuggling hub along with Bosaso, El Ayo, Mareero and Shimbiro.

In May 2010, Puntland built a new naval base in Bandar Siyada. The person in charge was Puntland's Minister of Ports Said Mohamed Rage.

According to a July 2012 report issued by the United Nations Somalia Eritrea Monitoring Group (SEMG), many countries are sending military supplies to Somalia despite the arms embargo, especially U.S. Central Intelligence Agency (CIA), which is training Puntland soldiers in Bandar Siyada.

In September 2013, Puntland Minister of Fisheries Mohamed Farah Adan announced that the Puntland government plans to open two new maritime training schools in Qaw and Eyl, another northeastern coastal town. The institutes are intended to buttress the regional fisheries industry and enhance the skill set of the Ministry's personnel and local fishermen.

In February 2014, Puntland's Minister of Women, Anisa Hajimumin, said of Bandar Siyada that despite being less than an hour from Bosaso, it lacks primary and secondary schools, hospitals, roads, and employment opportunities.

In May 2014, a Puntland military court sentenced 14 navy soldiers belonging to the Bandar Siyada district to five years in prison for burning down a truck in a village south of Bosaso.

In February 2015, Ciise Maxamad Ciise was appointed chief of the Wabeeneeye clan in Bandar Siyada.

In March 2016, Bosaso police arrested 156 people suspected of collaborating with al-Shabaab. A number were also arrested between Bosaso and Bandar Siyada.

In April 2017, a soil-filled wadi was restored in Bandar Siyada.

In a 2017 press release, it was announced that the International Committee of the Red Cross has been helping to improve catches in fishing villages in northern Somalia, including Eyl, Bandar Siyada and Hobyo.

In May 2018, the agricultural area of Bandar Siyada was severely damaged by torrential rains. At the time, Bandar Siyada was the source of vegetable supplies to Bosaso.

In July 2019, The New York Times reported that the United Arab Emirates and Qatar are helping Somali towns with arms and mercenaries in order to gain natural resource concessions. Hiiraan Online states that one of the recipients of its assistance is Bandar Siyada.

In November 2019, a whale carcass made headlines when it washed up on the shores of Bandar Siyada.

In February 2021, the Puntland military cracked down on illegal fishing on the north coast of Puntland, including Bandar Siyada, and arrested fishermen from Yemen. In March, 10 trawlers of Yemeni nationality were seized for illegal fishing in Qaw, El Ayo, Durduri, Las Khorey and other areas.
