= Islamic State – Somalia Province =

Branch of the Islamic State in Somalia

- ولاية الصومال
- Seal of the Islamic State in Somalia
- Founding leader: Abdul Qadir Mumin
- Emir: Abdul Qadir Mumin (2015–2023); Abdirahman Fahiye Isse Mohamud (2023–present)
- Deputy: Abdihakim Mohamed Ibrahim ("Dhoqob") †; Mahad Maalin †
- Dates active: October 2015–present
- Split from: al-Shabaab (2015)
- Headquarters: Galgala mountains
- Active regions: Somalia and Ethiopia
- Ideology: Ideology of the Islamic State
- Size: 100–200 (mid 2025)
- Part of: Islamic State
- Wars: Somali Civil War (2009–present); Islamic State insurgency in Puntland; Operation Hilaac
- Flag

Islamic State – Somalia Province (Note: Arabic: الدولة الإسلامية – ولاية الصومال, romanized: al-Dawlah al-Islāmīyah – Wilāyat al-Ṣūmāl, Somali: Dawladda Islaamiga ah - Gobolka Soomaaliya, Italian: Stato islamico – Provincia della Somalia) (IS–SP or ISS), Abnaa ul-Calipha (Note: Arabic: أبناء الخليفة) or Islamic State of Somalia is an affiliate of the Islamic State that primarily operates in the mountainous regions of Puntland, northern Somalia, and has claimed responsibility for multiple attacks across the country. The group first appeared in the latter half of 2015 when pro-Islamic State fighters within al-Shabaab defected and pledged allegiance to IS caliph Abu Bakr al-Baghdadi. The group has an estimated 500–700 fighters.

ISS remained dormant for a year after its founding but gained attention in 2016 by briefly capturing the port of Qandala. It controls a small, sparsely populated area in northern Somalia's mountains and was officially recognized by IS leadership as Somalia Province ("Wilayat al Somal") in December 2017. While cells have periodically appeared in southern Somalia and Kenya, the primary area of operations for ISS is the Al-Madow and Golis Mountains in Puntland, where the presence of both al-Shabaab and state authorities is weak.

ISS is mainly based on a single clan, namely the Majeerteen subclan Ali Saleebaan, which inhabits the districts of Qandala and Iskushuban in Puntland, and which is the subclan that Mumin belongs to. As of September 2024, foreign fighters possibly outnumber the groups Somali members, with Ethiopians reportedly being the single largest demographic represented within the organization. Notably ISS is also the declared enemy of al-Shabaab, which considers the Islamic State a significant threat to its own predominance among Jihadist factions in Somalia.

Since December 2024, Islamic State in Somalia (ISS) has escalated its operations, shifting from sporadic low-level activity to launching sustained offensives against Puntland security forces. This strategic shift has marked a new phase in the group's insurgency, with an increasing number of attacks being executed in quick succession. Many of these operations have been claimed by the Islamic State's central media apparatus, indicating a closer alignment between ISS and IS Central. These attacks have included ambushes, targeted killings, and coordinated assaults on military outposts, signaling both a rise in operational capacity and a renewed effort to undermine Puntland's control in contested regions.

== History ==
=== Origins and insurgency (2012–2015) ===
The origins of the Islamic State in Somalia trace back to 2012, when Abdul Qadir Mumin was sent by the al-Shabaab leadership to its remote outpost in Puntland, far from the insurgent group's primary areas of operation in southern Somalia. As a cleric with little military experience, Mumin's role in Puntland was originally to attract recruits for the numerically small and militarily weak local al-Shabaab group, which was led by Mohamed Said Atom at the time. During the course of the Galgala campaign in 2014, however, Atom defected to the government, and Mumin was forced to take control of the Puntland group. Isolated in the remote north and feeling increasingly distanced from al-Shabaab, Mumin began to consider himself more ideologically and operationally independent.

Meanwhile, the Islamic State had launched a propaganda campaign to convince al-Shabaab to join to them, which was "angrily refused" by al-Shabaab's central leadership. Despite this, several cells of al-Shabaab members found IS's ideology attractive or saw this new Jihadist organization as a way to challenge al-Shabaab's leadership at the time. Thus, several small pro-IS groups emerged in southern Somalia. This was however not tolerated by the Somali organization, which released statements condemning dissenters (Note: Al-Shabaab radio stations for example declared in November 2015: "If anyone says he belongs to another Islamic movement [other than that of al-Qa'ida], kill him on the spot ... we will cut the throat of anyone ... if they undermine unity." Al-Shabaab spokesman Ali Mahmud Rage similarly claimed that dissenters in the organization were "infidels" who would be "burnt in hell".) and ordered its internal security service Amniyat to arrest or kill pro-IS elements such as Hussein Abdi Gedi's faction in Middle Juba.

Mumin, however, long dissatisfied with his situation, pledged bay'ah to Abu Bakr al-Baghdadi and the Islamic State in October 2015. This caused a violent split within Puntland's al-Shabaab, as only 20 of the 300 local Islamist fighters joined Mumin, while the al-Shabaab loyalists attempted to kill these defectors. Mumin's small group proceeded to form Abnaa ul-Calipha, better known as Islamic State in Somalia, and to evade their erstwhile comrades, while recruiting new members for their cause. Al-Baghdadi and the IS leadership did not acknowledge Mumin's bay'ah, but IS central media continued to promote them in the following years While Mumin's group in the north thus managed to survive, the situation of pro-IS forces in southern Somalia consequently became even more precarious. In two notable incidents in November and December 2015, al-Shabaab attacked and destroyed two of the most important southern IS cells, namely the ones of Bashir Abu Numan and Mohamed Makkawi Ibrahim. Pro-government forces such as the Somali Armed Forces and Ahlu Sunna Waljama'a also claimed to have targeted southern IS groups. As result, IS forces in southern Somalia remained very weak, and those that survived appear to have accepted Mumin's authority over time, formally becoming part of ISS. As result, the "disparate clump of pro-Islamic State cells" in Somalia transformed into an "organized group". Most of the IS cells remaining in southern Somalia are concentrated in Mogadishu.

=== Rise in power and Qandala campaign (2016) ===
A variant of the Islamic State in Somalia's usual black flag, which is also sometimes used by the group

In March 2016, an ISS cell in southern Puntland was pursued by al-Shabaab fighters into Mudug; the pursuers were however attacked and completely defeated by the Puntland Dervish Force and Galmudug soldiers, thus unintentionally allowing the Islamic State militants to escape into safety. From this point onwards, ISS and al-Shabaab temporarily ceased fighting each other with the exception of some isolated incidents. Over the following months Mumin's followers built up their strength, and by April 2016 they had set up a temporary training camp named after Bashir Abu Numan, an early pro-IS dissident who had been killed by al-Shabaab in November 2015. In one of the group's propaganda videos, Mumin blessed the makeshift base as the "first camp of the Caliphate in Somalia". On 25 April, ISS also carried out its first attack on government forces, when one of its fighters detonated an IED against an AMISOM vehicle in Mogadishu. By August 2016, Mumin's cell still remained very small, probably under 100 militants, and was not yet very active. According to the United States Department of State, however, ISS began to expand in size by abducting and indoctrinating boys between 10 and 15 and employing them as child soldiers.

By October 2016, ISS had claimed less than one dozen attacks overall since its foundation, showing that the group was still relatively weak. Nevertheless, the fact that many of these strikes had taken place in Mogadishu, indicated that ISS had become able to operate throughout wider Somalia, not just in its core regions in Puntland. Experts also estimated that Mumin's cell had significantly grown to up to 300 fighters. On 26 October, the group eventually launched their first major operation by targeting the major port town of Qandala. The town had both symbolic as well as strategic significance, as it could allow ISS to bolster their local support and receive more supplies from Yemen. The Islamic State fighters managed to overrun the town, meeting little resistance, and thereafter controlled it largely unchallenged until 3 December. On that day, the Puntland Security Force launched a counter-offensive, and after sporadic fighting for four days, retook Qandala on 7 December 2016. Mumin's men were forced to retreat to El Ladid, a village 30 kilometers south of Qandala, where government forces once again attacked and scattered them on 18 December. Overall, ISS suffered numerous casualties during the Qandala campaign, but had scored a symbolic victory nonetheless, having captured and held a major town for more than a month. Having established a new headquarters in the al-Mishkat Mountains, ISS subsequently managed to attract new recruits, mostly children and orphans, though also some new defectors from al-Shabaab. It also became generally more active.

=== Expanded terrorist attacks and announcement of Wilayat al Somal ===
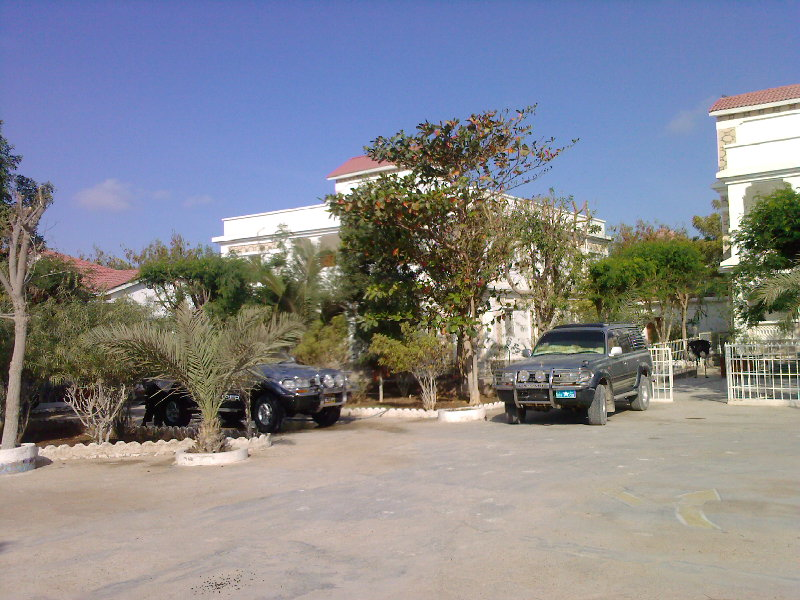
ISS launched an unsuccessful attack on the Village Hotel in Bosaso in February 2017.

The Qandala campaign resulted in the Puntland government as well as the African Union taking ISS more seriously, with both taking more steps to counter ISS' growing strength. In addition, ISS began to cooperate with al-Shabaab to a limited degree during the subsequent months. On 8 February 2017, ISS launched its next major attack in Puntland, with several militants of the group attacking the Village Hotel in Bosaso. A fierce shootout ensued, with the hotel's guards eventually repelling the attackers. At least four guards and two ISS fighters died during the fighting. On 28 March 2017, ISS ambushed a convoy of Puntland soldiers near Qandala. The attackers retreated into the hills after inflicting two casualties on the government forces. On 16 April, the group occupied Dasan village near Qandala, though abandoned it again after a few hours. ISS was also blamed for a roadside bomb in Galgala on 23 April that killed 8 soldiers and injured 3 others. On 23 May 2017, ISS carried out a suicide bombing, which was possibly the group's very first suicide attack. When the ISS suicide bomber tried to close in on the Juba Hotel in Bosaso, he was stopped at a military checkpoint, causing him to detonate his explosives, killing five and wounding twelve.

In June 2017, a Puntland military official claimed that ISS had been reduced to around 70 active fighters, and sustained itself by stealing food and livestock from local communities. Regional expert Matthew Bryden, on the other side, said that ISS still had up to 300 fighters and had become entrenched in the eastern Galgala mountains, where it had gained the support of some local communities which felt ignored by the government. Observers also noted that ISS had significantly increased their output of propaganda material in an attempt to sway disenfranchised locals and international jihadists to their side. By late 2017, the United Nations estimated that Mumin's group was about 200 fighters strong.

In November 2017, the United States launched their first airstrikes on ISS, reportedly killing several members of the group in Buqo Valley, east of Bosaso. They failed to kill Mumin, however, who had been the main target of the bombings. Observers noted that these airstrikes indicated that the US military had come to see ISS as considerable threat to the stability of the region. On 25 December, IS released an anti-Christian propaganda video under the name "Hunt Them Down, O Monotheists", in which the Islamic State in Somalia was called Wilayat al Somal (Somalia Province), thus seemingly elevating the group to an official province of the proclaimed worldwide caliphate of IS. Since then, however, the new name has not been consistently applied to the group by pro-IS media.

=== Reignited rivalry with al-Shabaab ===
March 2018 Voice of America report about the activities of ISS and al-Shabaab near Bosaso

Meanwhile, ISS started to launch assassination attempts in the region around Mogadishu from November 2017, with the town Afgooye most affected. From then on, the group greatly increased its rate of attacks on government targets. By May 2018, ISS had reportedly carried out eleven attacks and killed 23 people who had allegedly worked for the government, such as intelligence agents, soldiers, officials, and policemen. In response to these assaults, the National Intelligence and Security Agency started to arrest suspected ISS members in and around Mogadishu. ISS also abducted nine people in the region around Qandala in January 2018, including some off-duty soldiers. The militia later tortured and decapitated at least three of them, leaving them along a road to be found by passersby. At the end of 2018, ISS claimed to have carried out 66 attacks, more than in 2016 and 2017 combined.

As we record these crimes, we do not do so as a complaint or out of weakness, but to teach people, especially our people in Somalia, what the al Qaeda branch in Somalia has done, because the response from the Islamic State is coming.

— Islamic State in Somalia warning to al-Shabaab (Al Naba newsletter, 15 November 2018)

The group also grew more sophisticated and further expanded its presence throughout Somalia. It had begun to collect taxes (essentially protection money) on businesses in Bosaso by August 2018, greatly increasing its revenue. At some point in 2018, ISS managed to convince a significant number of al-Shabaab militants to defect, resulting in the formation of an Islamic State cell in Beledweyne. As result of its increasing activity in central and southern Somalia, the rivalry between ISS and al-Shabaab reignited in full, with several clashes occurring between the groups. In October 2018, al-Shabaab executed ISS deputy, Mahad Maalin in Mogadishu, while Islamic State forces ambushed an al-Shabaab group near B'ir Mirali, southwest of Qandala, reportedly killing 14 rival militants. The growing violence between the two jihadist rebel factions resulted in al-Shabaab central command releasing a speech as well as an 18-page treatise on 20 December 2018. In these works, the Islamic State was sharply rebuked as corrupt, apostate, and seditionist force, while al-Shabaab authorized its loyalists to destroy ISS elements as "disease in the Jihad". This amounted to an official declaration of war.

In the next months, the two factions greatly increased their attacks against each other: They clashed near El Adde in December 2018, and at numerous locations in Puntland between January and March 2019. ISS reportedly suffered one major setback during these clashes when it lost one of its main bases in the Dasaan area to al-Shabaab. Regardless, neither organizations appears to have suffered to a tangible degree from this inter-rebel fighting, and both have continued to strike government targets. The United States Air Force carried out an airstrike against ISS on 14 April 2019, killing its deputy Abdihakim Mohamed Ibrahim at Xiriiro, Bari region. On 12 July 2019, ISS militants clashed with security forces near the Safa hotel in Puntland's capital, Bosaso, the same day as an al-Shabaab attack on a hotel in Kismayo. The United States Air Force bombed an ISS base in the Golis Mountains on 8 May 2019, reportedly killing 13 militants.

On 27 October 2019, IS Caliph Abu Bakr al-Baghdadi was killed in the Barisha raid, whereupon the organisation's central command elected Abu Ibrahim al-Hashimi al-Qurashi as new leader. On 4 November, the Islamic State in Somalia officially pledged allegiance to al-Qurashi. By this time, ISS was regarded as important element in IS's international network, but still suffered from an inability to expand due to pressure by al-Shabaab, the Somali Armed Forces, and the United States Armed Forces. From late 2019, the group consequently attempted to become more active beyond Somalia's borders, as its forces tried to infiltrate Ethiopia and recruit new forces there. Its operations in Ethiopia were repeatedly crushed by local security forces, and several militants were arrested. ISS had also set up a new training camp, codenamed "Dawoud al Somali", probably in northern Puntland.

=== 2020s ===
In course of 2020's first half, ISS gradually increased the number of its attacks, while its troops evicted al-Shabaab from the contested area around Dasaan, Mudug region. At the same time, it suffered several setbacks. The Puntland Security Forces destroyed several ISS cells in and around Bosaso, hampering the group's ability to operate in the north. ISS' uptick in activity was consequently focused on southern Somalia, mostly Mogadishu. In July, the Puntland Security Forces launched an offensive against ISS south of Bosaso. Supported by the United States Armed Forces, the Puntland troops reportedly inflicted heavy casualties on the Islamic State militants, although the insurgents claimed to have eventually repelled the attack.

==== The killing of Bilal al-Sudani ====
On January 25, 2023, Senior IS leader Bilal al-Sudani was killed in a US military operation, alongside another 10 members of the Islamic State in Somalia, according to two senior Biden administration officials. Secretary of Defense Lloyd Austin confirmed that event in a statement later:

On January 25, on orders from the president, the US military conducted an assault operation in northern Somalia resulting in the deaths of several of ISIS members, including Bilal al-Sudani, an ISIS leader in Somalia and a key facilitator for the group's global network. Bilal al-Sudani was responsible for fostering the growing presence of ISIS in Africa and funding the group's operations worldwide, including in Afghanistan. No civilians were harmed as a result of this operation.

==== ISS expansion and Puntland counterinsurgency operation ====
Map of the 2025 Puntland offensive against the Islamic State

During 2024, ISS began gaining ground. The base of operations for ISS for several years has been Qandala, 70 km away from the port of Bosaso, and expansion from this pocket previously proved to be elusive for the group. In mid-2024, ISS struck al-Shabaab forces operating east of Bosaso and further expanded their presence west over roughly 100 km to the coastal town of Alula. Uncharacteristically, ISS has so far not imposed strict rules on the local populations it has come into contact with, though have recently began carrying assassinations, bombings and kidnappings in Bosaso. Africa Confidential observed that in general, "There is no interference in daily life, no taxation, and no rigid prohibitions". AFRICOM commander US Gen. Michael Langley claimed in an October 2024 interview with Voice of America that ISS had grown "twofold" over the previous year.

By January 2025, Puntland state was conducting a major offensive against ISS positions in the mountains of Bari Region. By 11 January numerous ISS bases had been captured in "Operation Hillaac".

== Organisation ==
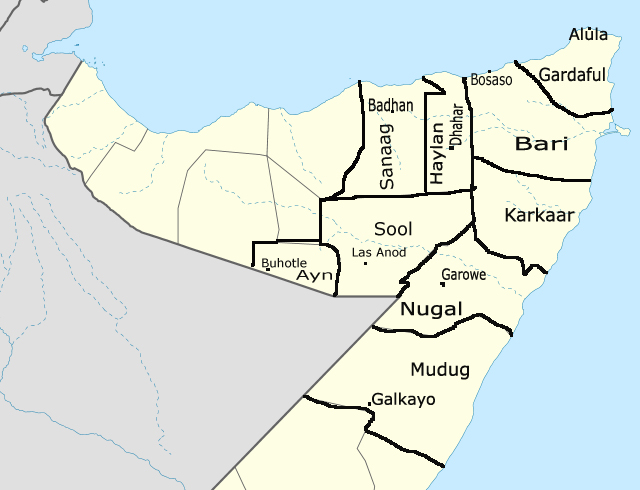
ISS is primarily active in the eastern Galgala Mountains, which mostly lie in the Bari region of Puntland.

The Islamic State in Somalia is led by Abdul Qadir Mumin, whose role in the continued existence of the group has been judged to be extremely important. Described as "eloquent and persuasive, [...] very savvy and sophisticated", Mumin is deeply involved in international jihadism and considered to be an extremely dangerous terrorist leader. After reports circulated in June/July 2017 that Abu Bakr al-Baghdadi had been killed, terror expert Candyce Kelshall even speculated that Mumin might be tempted to declare himself the new caliph of IS. Mumin's direct control is however limited to ISS forces in northern Somalia. Though pro-IS cells in the southern parts of the country have probably accepted Mumin as their official leader, the exact relationship between the northern and southern groups of ISS remains unclear. It is possible that the latter only have nominal links to the northern branch or no actual contact at all. In any case, the southern cells remain mostly weak and exist in a precarious state, constantly threatened by al-Shabaab.

Besides Mumin, two other ISS commanders were known: Mahad Maalin served as field commander and deputy of the group until his death in October 2018. He was succeeded as deputy by Abdihakim Mohamed Ibrahim, alias "Dhoqob", who was believed to be Mumin's "right-hand man". Dhoqob was killed on 14 April 2019, and his death was portrayed by the United States Africa Command as major blow to ISS.

=== Territorial control ===
Though it is probable that ISS controls a relatively small territory in Puntland's mountainous hinterland. ISS' current areas are only very sparsely settled or not populated at all, while Qandala's civilian population completely fled during its occupation by the militants. It has occasionally highlighted its "healthcare services" in the remote villages in Puntland in its propaganda videos, showing a Somali-Canadian doctor named "Yusuf al-Majerteeni", who died in 2018. By November 2019, ISS controlled the villages of Dasaan and Shebaab in Bari region. The group is known to use caves as hiding places.

In 2025, Puntland removed ISS from Bosaso, but the militant group still controlled villages and small towns in the nearby mountains.

=== Military strength ===
The strength of the Islamic State in Somalia fluctuated over time, and is not known with certainty. Mumin's initial cell was estimated at 20 members, growing to less than 100 by August 2016. At the time of the Qandala campaign, a former Puntland Intelligence Agency official argued that ISS counted 200 to 300 militants. Following its defeat at Qandala, local observers judged that the group declined to just 70–150 members by June 2017. The Islamic State in Somalia subsequently recruited new fighters to alleviate its manpower shortage, though Somali journalists gave widely different accounts on the success of this recruitment drive. Accordingly, ISS was believed to be between 100 and 300 militants strong by mid-2018. The vast majority of ISS members are Somalis, with only a few foreign mujahideen fighting for the group, including Sudanese, Yemenis, Ethiopians, Egyptians, Djiboutis, and at least one Canadian. However, by 2024, the group's membership makeup had been significantly altered with approximately half of ISS being composed of foreigners, predominantly from East Africa and Yemen. This influx of foreign fighters significantly bolstered ISS's strength, with the groups members being numbered at 600 to 700 according to a United Nations Security Council report from 2024.

=== Propaganda ===
The propaganda of ISS is generally extremely inferior compared to its direct rival al-Shabaab. The Islamic State in Somalia initially had no media wing of its own and also has not organized a "robust informal media presence". Instead, it previously relied on the existing propaganda channels of IS, such as the Amaq News Agency, the Al Naba newsletter, al-Furat Media Center, the Global Front to Support the Islamic State, and the media arms of other IS branches in Iraq, Syria, Yemen, Egypt, and Libya. The propaganda video of December 2017 that declared ISS a province, however, also claimed to have been produced by the "Media Office of Wilayat al Somal". In late 2019, ISS began releasing propaganda in Amharic, a language widely spoken in Ethiopia, in an attempt to attract new recruits there. Besides eulogizing dead fighters and emphasizing ISS' military capabilities, the group's propaganda also employs other common tropes of Islamic State propaganda such as portraying the rebel-held areas as "paradise".

== Supply, support and allies ==
In its endeavor to build up its military strength, the Islamic State in Somalia is aided by the fact that Puntland's government has only limited control over its hinterland while its military is overstretched. Peripheral areas are thus mostly ignored by the security forces and instead run by rebellious and infighting tribal militias. As result, local clans (including Mumin's own, the Majeerteen Ali Saleban) are aggrieved by their perceived marginalisation by the government and in some cases ready to support ISS. Such dissatisfied elements are the ones from which ISS receives supplies and recruits new members. There have also been accounts, however, that ISS raids those communities which do not supply it with food and other necessities, and to kidnap children in order to indoctrinate and train them as child soldiers. The group is also known to collect taxes in areas which it controls or at least influences.

The group is also directly supported by the Islamic State – Yemen Province, which is known to have sent experts, trainers, money, weapons and other materials to ISS. The United Nations also claimed in November 2017 that ISS receives direct assistance from IS officials in Syria and Iraq. In smuggling fighters and supplies across the Gulf of Aden, ISS works closely with Somali pirates, namely Mohamed Garfanje's Hobyo-Haradhere Piracy Network and another unidentified group that is based in Qandala. These pirates do, however, also supply ISS' rival in Puntland, al-Shabaab, with weapons and other materials.

Furthermore, ISS has been supported by "financial operative" Mohamed Mire Ali Yusuf (often simply called Mire Ali) who provided the group with money and supplies through two companies, both located in Bosaso by 2016: Liibaan Trading, a livestock trading business, and Al-Mutafaq Commercial Company. The United States Department of the Treasury designated Mire as terrorist and sanctioned his two businesses in February 2018. Australia has designated the militant as a terrorist organization, alleging that its experts, trainers, funds and weapons are being used to recruit members from local communities to collaborate with Somali pirates.

=== Alleged state support ===
According to a New York Times report, Qatar may have financed and directed an Islamic State attack in Puntland on 10 May 2019 in order to pressure the United Arab Emirates to end development of a port in Bosaso and to have the contract replaced with Qatar. An influential Qatari businessman named Khalifa al-Muhannadi reportedly claimed Qatari involvement in the attack in a phone call to Qatar's ambassador to the Federal Government of Somalia. Neither Muhannadi nor the ambassador denied the phone call took place, but Qatar claimed al-Muhannadi acted independently while also criticizing the report.

=== Funding and donations ===
Abdiweli Mohamed Yusuf is the head of ISSP's finance office since 2019. Yusuf is an integral part of delivering foreign fighters and supplies for ISSP, which helps distribute funds to other IS branches across Africa.

In early 2023, a United Nations (UN) report found that the al-Karrar office in Somalia was sending $25,000 per month in cryptocurrency to the Islamic State Khorasan Province, a later UN report confirmed that al-Karrar is the biggest donor of ISKP.

Puntland said they are investigating ISSP uses illegal gold mining and other resources in Cal Miskaad, Bari region for funding. ISSP hires local workers for mining, while also forcing people under their rule to pay ISSP to avoid interference with their lives and work.

== See also ==
- Islamic Wilayaat of Somalia
