= Battle of Af Urur =

2017 attack in Puntland, Somalia

- Part of the War in Somalia
- An Al-Shabaab militant inside the base's camp during the battle.
Date	8 June 2017
Location	Af Urur, Somalia
Result	Al-Shabaab victory

Belligerents
Al-Shabaab	Puntland

Commanders and leaders
Unknown	(Puntland) Lt. Col. Ahmed Muse Sangal † (base commander) (Puntland) Lt. Col. Mohamed Salah Jama Tusbahle † (Puntland) Col. Shire Cumar Cali † (Puntland) Capt. Yasin Nur Mohamed

Units involved
Unknown	Puntland Security Force: Puntland Dervish Force

Strength
150–200	c. 150

Casualties and losses
5+ killed	48+ killed 40 wounded several captured several defected
- 20+ civilians killed

The Battle of Af Urur took place on 8 June 2017, when al-Shabaab militants attacked and overran the military base and village of Af Urur in Puntland, killing many soldiers of the Puntland Security Force. It was the deadliest terrorist attack of any militant group in Puntland since the autonomous state's foundation in 1998.

== Background ==
The village of Af Urur is located in the Galgala mountains, which have long served as al-Shabaab stronghold, with around 300 fighters of the group believed to be active there by early 2017. Thus part of a contested area, Af Urur has been attacked and overrun by insurgents several times, with their last attack having taken place in January 2017. At the time, the local military base was defended by the paramilitary Puntland Dervish Force, which managed to beat back the assault after a fierce battle. In March, around 30-40 clan militiamen and insurgents surrendered to the Puntland forces at Af Urur and were integrated into the base garrison; the following events however suggest that at least some of these fighters were in reality still loyal to al-Shabaab and served as sleeper cells.

== Battle ==
On 8 June 2017, around 4:30 a.m., a force of around 150–200 militants began to attack Af Urur, held by around 150 soldiers, from three directions. The attack came as complete surprise to the local garrison, and most of the soldiers were asleep when it happened. Using a suicide car bomb, the attackers breached the base's defenses, at the area where the aforementioned new recruits were stationed. Probably aided by sleeper cells there, the attackers then entered the base, shouting "God is great". A two-hour long firefight for the base and the village ensued, during which at least 48 soldiers were killed, including base commander Lieutenant Colonel Ahmed Muse Sangal, Lieutenant Colonel Mohamed Salah Jama Tusbahle, and Colonel Shire Cumar Cali. Eventually, the surviving Puntland soldiers had to retreat with 40 wounded comrades from Af Urur to nearby Armo town, whereupon the al-Shabaab fighters began to destroy and loot the base. They captured two dozen heavy machine guns, a large number AK-47s along with a substantial amount ammunition. The militants also burnt 16 military vehicles, which were left behind by the soldiers.

At the village, several residents were allegedly beheaded by the militants. Overall, at least 20 civilians were reported to have been killed. Soon after, the al-Shabaab forces retreated from Af Urur, taking with them their spoils, the defectors and a number of captives. Afterwards, the Puntland Security Force retook the town and base, and began burying the dead.

== Aftermath ==
Al-Shabaab later claimed that they had killed at least 61 soldiers in the attack, though the Puntland security minister Abdi Hirsi Ali strongly disputed this, saying that most of the killed were civilians. Somali government officials consequently vowed revenge for the attack, with President of Puntland Abdiweli Mohamed Ali saying that "I want to tell people in Puntland, wherever they are, to prepare for war against these religious bandits who attacked our country". Numerous high-ranking Puntland officials visited Af Urur on 17 June in order to assess the local security situation. Furthermore, Puntland's government announced its plans to launch an offensive against al-Shabaab.

Af Urur suffered from further attacks by al-Shabaab in the next two years.
