= Tiinle =

Somali subclan of Darod

Tiinle تينلي
Regions with significant populations

The Tiinle (Somali: Tiinle, Arabic: تينلي) is a Somali clan which is also subclan of Darod clan. They live in Kaladhac town near Waiye district and Af Urur. They are fathered with Gabtaanle, Dishiishe and Maganlabe.
