= Miskat =

Mountain range in Bari region of Puntland

Miskat Mountains, (Somali: Buuraha Cal-Miskaad) also known as Mishkat, is a mountain range in the northeastern region of Bari, Puntland. Aloe miskatana which occurs in the mountain range is named after it. Since 2017, the mountain range has been occupied by and serves as the headquarters of IS-S, a Jihadist group fighting in the Somali Civil War (2009-present).Somalian force of puntland are also currently trying to siege ISIS.

== See also ==
- Cal Madow
- Karkaar
