= Af Urur =

Town in Puntland, Somalia

- Town
- Location within Somalia
- Coordinates: 10°50′21″N 48°55′55″E
- State: Puntland
- Region: Bari, Somalia

Af Urur is a town in the Puntland state of Somalia, located on the Golis Mountains, somewhat far from Bosaso, but its exact location is not known. The settlement is placed at a strategically important location, and has thus become strongly contested during the Somali Civil War. One of the most prominent clans in the village are the Tiinle.

== History ==
Promixal to the al-Shabaab-controlled Galgala hills, the village has been attacked and captured by the militant group several times. Af Urur contains a camp for a contingent of the Darawish paramilitary group, which have been fighting al-Shabab.

In June 2017, Af Urur was the site of an attack by al-Shabaab militants against a Somali military encampment, leading to between 20 and 70 deaths. It was one of the deadliest al-Shabaab attacks in Puntland.

Al-Shabaab again attacked and fully occupied the village on 20 July 2018. Af Urur was subsequently retaken by Puntland's military, but the local garrison retreated on 8 June 2019, allowing al-Shabaab to capture it once again. On 11 June, Darawish troops counterattacked, and restored control over Af Urur.
