= Mumin Abdi Shire =

Puntland police chief

General Mumin Abdi Shire Muumin Cabdi Shire مؤمن عبدي شيري
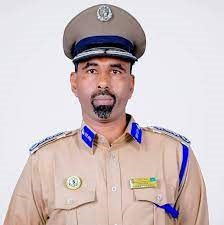

Chief of the Puntland Police Force
- Incumbent
- Assumed office 26 October 2022
- President: Said Abdullahi Deni (second-term)
- Vice President: Ilyas Osman Lugator
- President: Said Abdullahi Deni (first-term)
- Vice President: Ahmed Elmi Osman

Personal details
- Born: 14 February 1981 (age 45) Burtinle, Nugal
- Party: Independent
- Education: Somali National University
- Nickname: Mumin Madaxweyne

Military service
- Years of service: 1995-present
- Rank: Brigadier General; Sareeye Guuto (PPF)

General Mumin Abdi shire (Somali: General Muumin Cabdi Shire, Arabic: مؤمن عبدي شيري) is a Puntland, Somalia, police chief and former Mudug Region Police Commissioner officer. He is the current Police Commissioner of Puntland Police Force.

== See also ==
- Puntland Police Force
