= Gabtaanle =

Gabtaaanle غابتانلي
Regions with significant populations

Religion
- Islam

Related ethnic groups
- Dishiishe, Warsangeli, Tiinle, Majeerteen, Ogaden, Maganlabe, Gabtaanle and other Darod groups.

The Gabtaanle (Somali: Gabtaanle, Arabic: غابتانلي) is a Somali clan. It is a sub-clan of Ahmed Harti, also called Mooracase, with Dishiishe, Tiinle and Maganlabe as brother clans. Gabtaanle's forefather was the first man to settle in the area currently known as Bosaso. The clan members have permanent presence in the Bari and Sanaag regions in Somalia, particularly Bosaso, and Dhahar among other towns and villages.

They are mainly inhabited Puntland Bosaso along with their other subclans of Darod, mainly Moracase.
