= Mohamed Makkawi Ibrahim =

Sudanese jihadist (1984 – 2015)

Mohamed Makkawi Ibrahim Mohamed
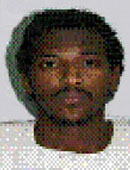
- Born: 1984; United Arab Emirates
- Died: 4 December 2015 (aged 30–31); Jamame, Lower Juba, Somalia
- Military career
- Allegiance: al-Shabaab (2010–2015); Islamic State
- Conflicts: Somali Civil War

Mohamed Makkawi Ibrahim Mohamed (Arabic: محمد مكاوي ابراهيم محمد; 1984 – December 4, 2015), also known as Abu Sulayman, (Arabic: ابو سليمان) was a Sudanese jihadist who was involved with both Al Qaeda and the Islamic State (IS). He was known for his participation in the murder of two USAID employees in Sudan and later became one of the early leaders of IS in Somalia.

== Early life ==
Mohamed Makkawi Ibrahim Mohamed was born in the United Arab Emirates in 1984, where he spent his early years before returning to Sudan, the homeland of his ancestors, as a teenager. Upon his return, he enrolled in the Sudan University of Science and Technology to study engineering. However, Makkawi dropped out and became involved in Islamist militancy. This transition was reportedly influenced by the growing radical Islamist movements in Sudan during the early 2000s.

== Involvement in the murder of USAID employees ==
Makkawi's first significant involvement in jihadist activities began with the Al-Salamah Group, a cell linked to Al Qaeda that operated in Sudan. In August 2007, the group attempted to carry out bombings in Khartoum, targeting sites in the city's southern suburb. This group was part of a broader network often referred to as Al-Qa'ida in the Land of the Two Niles (AQTN). While the group succeeded in detonating at least one bomb, Sudanese authorities quickly dismantled the network. Makkawi managed to evade capture during the crackdown and fled to the Darfur region, where he continued his involvement in jihadist activities.

In January 2008, Makkawi and three associates carried out the assassination of John Granville, an American USAID official, and his Sudanese driver, Abdelrahman Abbas Rahama, in Khartoum. The group responsible for the murders was connected to both AQTN and Ansar al Tawhid, another Sudanese jihadist faction. Although the Islamic State later claimed that the two victims were American intelligence agents attempting to arrest Makkawi, independent sources have consistently described the attack as a terrorist operation targeting U.S. interests in Sudan. Following the assassination, the U.S. State Department included Makkawi in its Rewards for Justice Program, offering a $5 million bounty for information leading to his capture.

== Imprisonment ==
Makkawi was apprehended by Sudanese authorities in February 2008 after a brief but intense shootout in Khartoum. He, along with his accomplices, was imprisoned at Kober Prison, a high-security facility in Sudan known for housing extremists and political prisoners. Makkawi's time in Kober Prison was marked by a growing sense of notoriety among jihadist circles.

In June 2010, Makkawi and three others managed to escape from the prison through a tunnel they had secretly dug from their cell. The audacious escape was later celebrated in jihadist propaganda, particularly in a 2012 documentary released by Ansar al Tawhid, where Makkawi narrated the details of the escape. This event further elevated his status within jihadist networks. Following the escape, Makkawi reportedly spent a year in hiding in Sudan before making his way to Somalia to join al-Shabaab.

== Al-Shabaab and defection to Islamic State ==
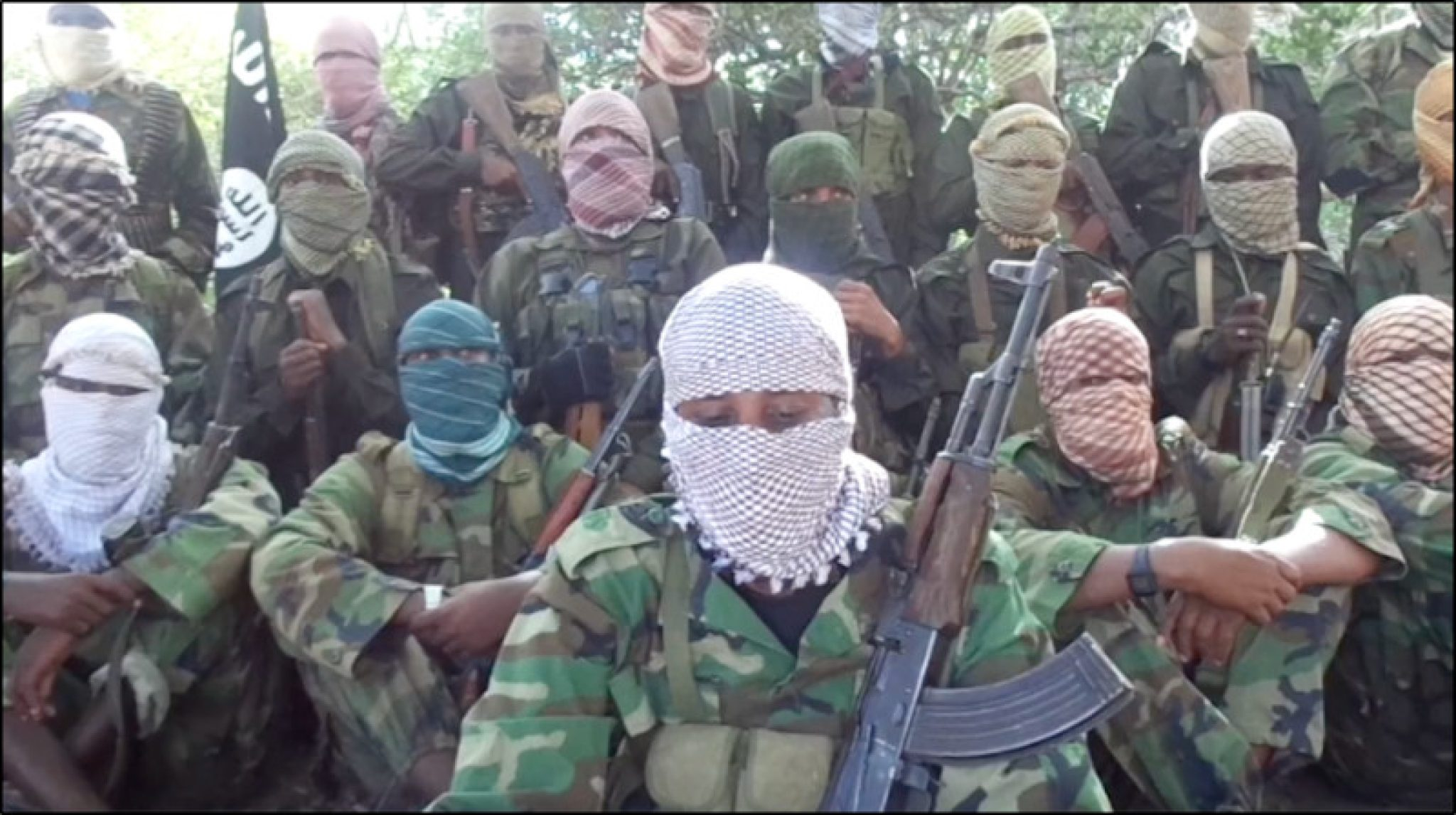
Defectors from Al-Shabab to a pro-Islamic State splinter group, led by Mohamed Makkawi Ibrahim Mohamed, pledge allegiance to IS amir Abu Bakr al-Baghdadi in 2015.

Around May 2011, Makkawi arrived in Somalia, where he joined Al-Shabaab. In Somalia, Makkawi underwent extensive training, both militarily and religiously, and eventually became a prominent ideologue within his unit. During his time in Somalia, Makkawi was stationed in various locations, including the Boni Forest in northeastern Kenya, an area known for being a stronghold for Al-Shabaab militants. Disillusioned with Al-Shabaab's leadership and inspired by the rise of IS, Makkawi began to distance himself from Al-Shabaab's hierarchy.

Makkawi decided to pledge allegiance to IS leader, Abu Bakr al-Baghdadi. Makkawi's defection was not merely ideological; he actively sought to recruit others within Al-Shabaab to join the Islamic State, forming a small but dedicated group of IS loyalists. In response, Al-Shabaab's leadership attempted to suppress Makkawi's influence by pushing him toward committing a suicide attack, a common tactic used to neutralise dissent within the ranks. However, Makkawi refused to participate in such operations unless they were conducted under what he considered the "true banner of Islam". Makkawi and his followers attempted to travel to the Islamic State's stronghold in Libya. Unable to complete the journey due to Al-Shabaab's interference, Makkawi and his group instead recorded a video pledging allegiance to Baghdadi, which was later released by in November 2015. This public declaration of loyalty to IS intensified Al-Shabaab's efforts to eliminate him.

== Death ==
On December 4, 2015, Al-Shabaab's internal security unit, known as the Amniyat, tracked down Makkawi and his followers to a small farm near the town of Jamame. A fierce clash ensued, during which Makkawi was killed. Most of his followers either died in the confrontation or were captured by Al-Shabaab. Makkawi's death went largely unnoticed in international media, receiving only brief coverage in local Sudanese outlets. IS confirmed Makkawi's death in May 2016.
