= Wabeeneeye =

Somali sub-clan of Majeerteen

Regions with significant populations

Languages
- Somali

Religion
- Islam

Related ethnic groups
- Dhulbahante, Warsangali, Marehan, Ogaden and other Darod clans.

Wabeeneeye (Somali: Waabeeneeye, Arabic: وابيني) is a sub clan of the Majeerteen clan family and within the larger Harti clan and thereafter in the Darod.

== Lineage ==
There is no clear agreement on the clan and sub-clan structures and many lineages are omitted. The following listing is taken from the World Bank's Conflict in Somalia: Drivers and Dynamics from 2005 and the United Kingdom's Home Office publication, Somalia Assessment 2001. Paternal lineage DNA or y-chromosome DNA data from yfull.com indicates that the Somali clans that Wabeeneeye clusters most closely with are the Warsangeli and Dhulbahante clans, sharing a common paternal ancestor dating back roughly 900 years before the 21st century, indicating Wabeeneeye could be a Harti Waqooyi clan.
