= John Granville (diplomat) =

American diplomat

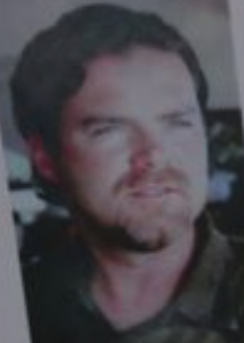
John Granville

John M. Granville (September 25, 1974 – January 1, 2008) was an American diplomat who worked in Southern Sudan. On January 1, 2008, he was assassinated in a shooting in Khartoum, Sudan.

== Career ==
Granville grew up in Buffalo, New York. He was a graduate of Canisius High School in 1993 and of Fordham University. In 2003, he graduated from Clark University with a Master of Arts degree in International Development and Social Change. He studied as a Fulbright Fellow in Africa. After school, Granville joined the Peace Corps and was sent to Cameroon for two years.

As a diplomat, Granville worked for the United States Agency for International Development in Kenya and Sudan. In his last assignment, he led a project to provide residents in South Sudan with 75,000 radios that could be powered by a crank generator or solar panels. The project was part of the preparations for the upcoming 2009 elections in South Sudan.

"He told his mom several times ... that it's dangerous, what he's doing, but he wouldn't want to be doing anything else," said U.S. Rep. Brian Higgins, who spoke with Granville's mother, Jane Granville, after her son's death.

== Death ==
On January 1, 2008, Granville was attacked by gunmen while being driven home from a New Year's Eve party at the British Embassy in Khartoum. According to Sudanese officials, Granville was ambushed by two gunmen who stopped their car in front of his. His driver, Abdel Rahman Abbas, was killed immediately. Another gunman shot Granville in the neck and chest. He died a few hours later, after being taken to a hospital.

Ali Sadiq, a spokesman for Sudan's Foreign Ministry, has stated, "We do not know why this happened. All options are possible." However, other Sudanese officials stated that gun crime is unusual in Khartoum. The United States State Department refused to comment because their investigation was in progress. The attack followed a warning by the United Nations that a terrorist cell in Sudan was planning to attack foreigners.

== Investigations and Imprisonment of Granville's Murderers ==
Both the US and the Sudanese government have announced investigations as to the causes of the shooting and efforts to find the perpetrators. The US effort will consist of a joint State Bureau of Diplomatic Security and Federal Bureau of Investigation team.

Four days after the murders, a previously unknown militant group, Ansar al-Tawhid (Companions of Monotheism) claimed responsibility via a post on a website used by Islamists.

In September, five Sudanese men admitted their roles in the shooting in filmed confessions.

On June 24, 2009, four men were sentenced to death by hanging for the killing. A fifth man received a two-year prison term for providing the weapon used in the attack. The convicts were identified as Abdelraouf Abu Zaid Mohamed Hamza, Mohamed Makawi Ibrahim Mohamed, Abdelbasit Alhaj Alhasan Haj Ahmad, and Mohanad Osman Yousif Mohamed.

In June 2010, the four men broke out of prison, killing a police officer and wounding another during their escape. Sudanese authorities then issued a global Interpol warrant for their arrest. One was recaptured three weeks later. Another was killed in Somalia in May 2011.

On January 30, 2023, Abdelraouf Abu Zaid was released from prison by Sudanese authorities. Zaid is said to be in his 30s, or older than the age Granville was when he was killed.

== Memorials ==
Granville's family in Buffalo said he was committed to his work in Africa.

"John's life was a celebration of love, hope and peace," a family statement said. "He will be missed by many people throughout the world whose lives were touched and made better because of his care."

On January 29, 2008, City Honors School in Buffalo awarded John Granville their annual Keeping The Dream Alive award, honoring the legacy of Martin Luther King Jr.

On May 2, 2008, John Negroponte, Deputy Secretary of State, addressed the American Foreign Service Association's memorial plaque ceremony in which he and others honored John Granville.

== See also ==
- United States Agency for International Development (USAID)
- Elections in Sudan
- 1973 Khartoum diplomatic assassinations
