= Puntland Police Force =

Police force in Somalia

Ciidanka Booliska Puntland: Puntland Police Force; قوة شرطة بونتلاند
- Abbreviation: PPF
- Motto: Difaacid iyo U adeegid (English: Protect and Serve)

Agency overview
- Formed: 1998; 28 years ago

Jurisdictional structure
- National agency: Puntland
- Operations jurisdiction: Puntland
- Governing body: Government of Puntland
- General nature: Local civilian police

Operational structure
- Headquarters: Garowe, Puntland
- Elected officer responsible: Said Abdullahi Deni, President of Puntland
- Agency executive: Brigadier General Mumin Abdi Shire, Police Commissioner
- Divisions: 11: Criminal Investigation Division (CID); Traffic Division; Communications Unit; Training Unit; Transport Department; Fire Brigade; Riot Unit

Website
- police.pl.so

The Puntland Police Force (PPF; Somali: Ciidanka Booliska Puntland; Arabic: قوة شرطة بونتلاند) is the state police force and the main civil law enforcement organization of Puntland. As with most other police forces in the world, its duties include crime fighting, traffic control, maintaining public safety, and counter-terrorism. It is under the jurisdiction of the Minister of Security and DDR.

Since 1998, it has served as one of the principal organs of the Puntland Armed Forces and upon reorganisation distanced itself away from the Armed Forces. While organised at a national level, each arm reports to a country police authority, which in turn divides its force by local police divisions, headquartered at local police stations; the police force was later reconstituted at the start of the 21st century.

In an emergency, the police can be reached by dialing 999 from any telephone in Puntland.

== Structure ==
Puntland Police Force, located in Central of Garowe, is the central administration for the Puntland Police Force.

It conducts management and supervision of the specialist agencies and police districts, including organizational development and support activities.

Commissioner is led by the Puntland Police Force, who, since 2022, has been Gen. Mumin Abdi Shire.

== Units ==
Puntland Police Force has 11 basic units and they are:

- Criminal Investigation Department
- Personnel Office
- Counter Terrorism
- Road Safety
- Human Resource Development
- Administration & Management
- Transportation & Communication
- Operations
- Special Police Unit (SPU)
- BIRMAD Police Unit
- Godir Unit

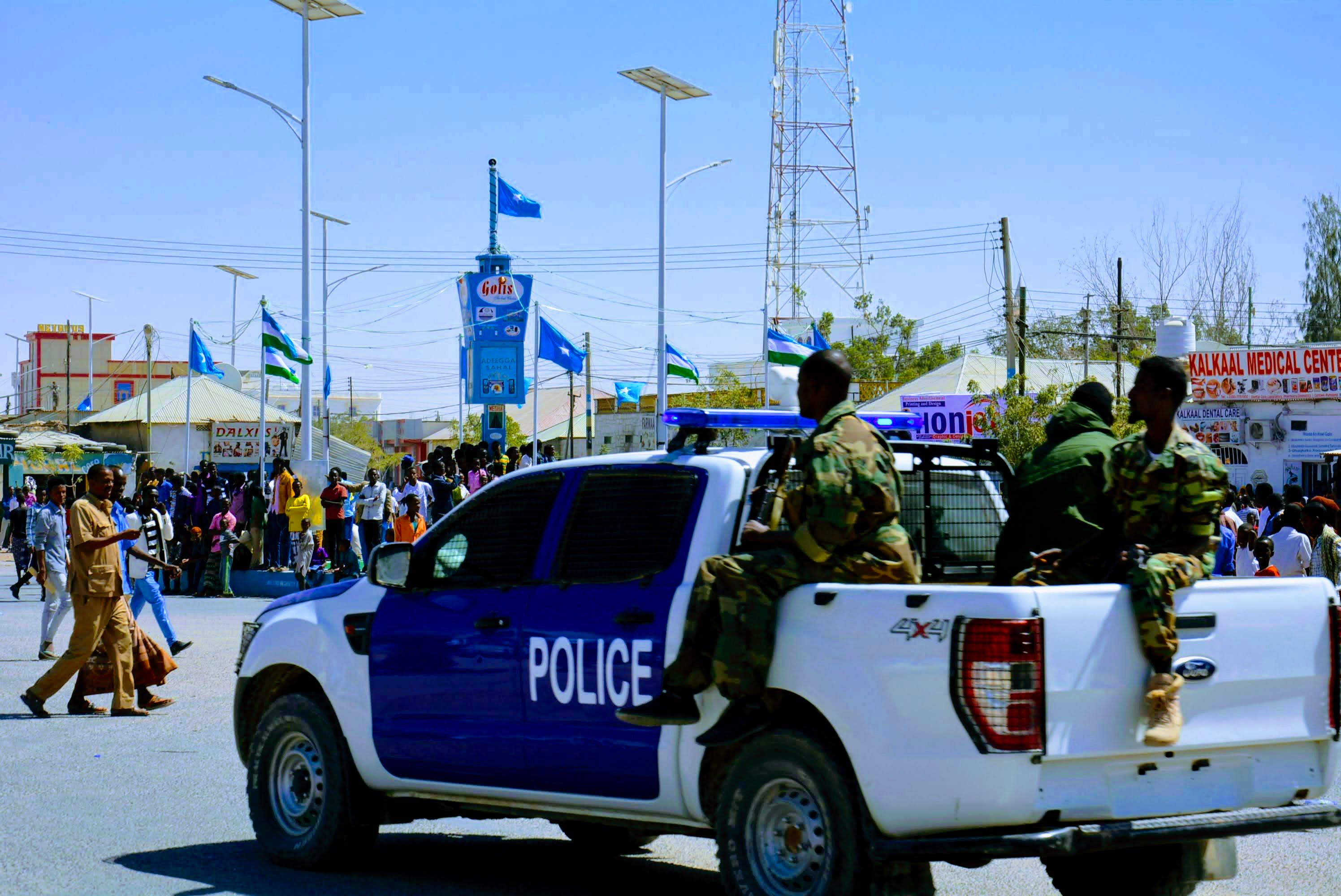
Puntland police force securing a city square (Barxadda Garowe)

=== CID ===
Criminal Investigation Department is a state unit which works with organized and serious crime which handled investigations, fingerprinting, criminal records, immigration matters, and passports.

CID works as full member unit for Puntland Police Force, with special focus on technical and tactical investigation, in addition to being responsible on its own for organized crime.

Establishments

Armo Police Academy

Department Overview

Puntland State Police,

Puntland State Police is a full-service law enforcement agency.

== See also ==
- Puntland Maritime Police Force
