= Durduri District =

Durduri
- District
- Country: Somalia
- Region: Sanaag
- Time zone: UTC+3 (EAT)

Durduri District is a district in the northern Sanaag region of Somalia.
