= Puntland Security Force =

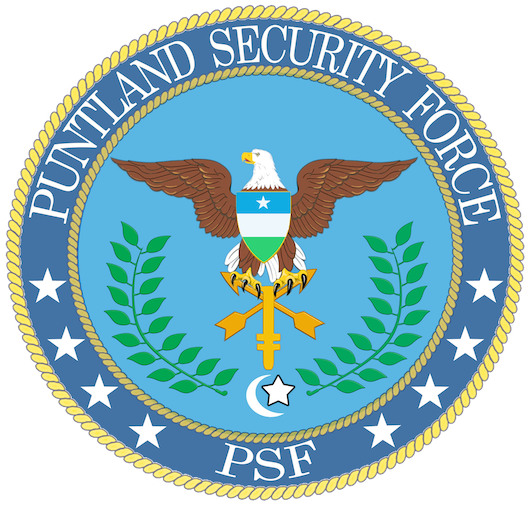
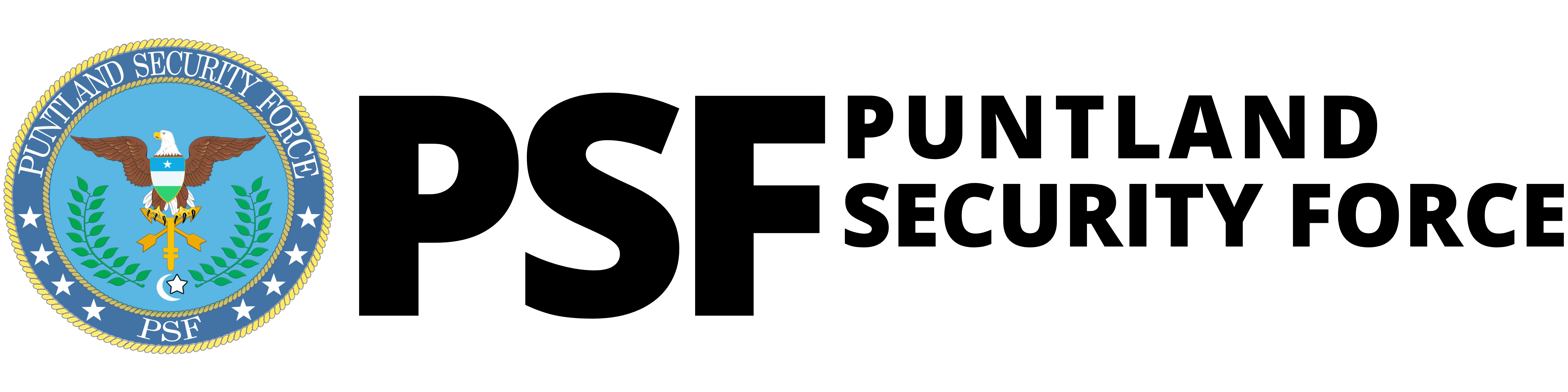
- Official seal of the Puntland Security Force Logo of the Puntland Security Force
- Active: 2002 – present
- Country: Puntland
- Branch: Ministry of Security (Puntland)
- Type: Law enforcement, counterterrorism
- Role: Law enforcement, counter-insurgency, internal security
- Garrison/HQ: Bosaaso
- Engagements: Somali Civil War; Somalia War (2006–2009); Galgala campaign; Somali Civil War (2009–present); Islamic State insurgency in Puntland; Qandala campaign; Battle of Af Urur; Puntland counter-terrorism operations
- Website: Official website

Commanders
- Current commander: Director General Mohamud Osman (2018 – present)
- Notable commanders: General Mohamed Aden Bidar (2003 – 2004); General Osman Abdullahi Mohamud (2004 – 2010); General Asad Osman Abdullahi (2010 – 2018)

The Puntland Security Force (PSF) is the security force of the semi-autonomous Puntland state in Somalia. The PSF was formed in 2002 to combat terrorism in the region and is independent from the federal government of Somalia and the Puntland government. Among PSF’s main functions are conducting crime scene analysis, capturing and eliminating high-level targets, and reconnaissance.

Since the founding of the state in 1998, Puntland Security Force has operated in Puntland and throughout Somalia. Commanders and senior officials are appointed by a qualified panel approved by the Council of Ministers. The Puntland security apparatus has an independent military judiciary, which during peacetime only adjudges military proceedings. Retired members of the Force are also constitutionally guaranteed pensions.

== History ==
The Puntland Security Force was formed in 1998 by the Puntland government.

In 2002, amid concerns that al-Qaeda elements were operating in East Africa, the PSF was formally established as part of the Puntland Intelligence Security (PIS), which combined the PSF and the Puntland Intelligence Agency (PIA), with assistance from the Puntland government and the Central Intelligence Agency.

In 2003, Mohamed Aden Bidar was appointed as the first PIS Director. Bidar then resigned and moved to Mogadishu where he became the first Commander of the Somali National Security Services (NSS). In 2004, Osman Abdullahi Mohamoud was appointed as PIS Director.

In June 2008, the Puntland Security Force (PSF) participated in a pivotal protection operation aimed at preventing a terrorist group from establishing hideouts in the Bargal Mountains, situated in the northeastern region of Somalia. This operation, characterized by strategic planning and coordinated efforts, underscored the PSF’s commitment to safeguarding the region against the threat of terrorism, thereby contributing to the overall stability and security of the area.

In 2009, President Faroole elected Colonel Ali Bindhe as a PIS Director without the consultation of U.S officials in Somalia. The officials rejected the appointment due to Bindhe’s lack of security experience. President Faroole and US officials agreed to divide the PIS into two divisions: the Puntland Security Force as a counterterrorism force, and the Puntland Intelligence Agency as an intelligence agency. The newly independent PSF was led by Director General Osman Abdullahi Mohamud.

After the passing of Director General Osman Abdullahi Mohamud, Asad Osman Abdullahi was appointed the new PSF Director in 2010.

In August 2010, the Puntland Security Forces (PSF) and other Puntland Defence groups launched a major offensive to eliminate Al Shabaab's daylight conquest of the town of Karin. The operation, which lasted close to a year, involved concerted efforts to counter the terrorist group’s advances and restore security to the region. Ultimately, the operation succeeded in pushing back Al Shabaab forces, forcing them to retreat towards the Galgala mountains.

In December 2018, Asad Osman Abdullahi resigned as the PSF General Director. After consultation with U.S. officials, Mohamud Osman Abdullahi was appointed as General Director.

== Puntland Dervish Force ==
The Puntland Dervish Force is separate from the PSF and operates officially as the National Guard of Puntland's Armed Forces.

=== Equipment ===
==== Individual Weapons ====
- Assault Rifle
  - AKM (Assault Rifle - 7.62×39mm)
  - AK-74 (Assault Rifle - 5.45×39mm)
- Machine Gun
  - PK machine gun (General-purpose machine gun - 7.62×54mmR)
- Heavy machine guns
  - 12.7mm DShK
  - 12.7mm NSV
- Sniper Rifle
  - SVD Dragunov (Sniper Rifle - 7.62×54mmR)
- Anti-Tank Explosive
  - RPG-7 (rocket-propelled grenade launcher - 40 mm)

==== Vehicles ====
- Main Battle Tank
  - T-54/T-55
- Armoured Personnel Carrier
  - BTR-60
  - Fiat 6614
- Military trucks
  - Renault GBC 180 (6×6)
  - M939 Truck (6×6)
- Pickup trucks
  - Toyota Land Cruiser J79
  - Toyota Hilux
  - Nissan Frontier
  - Armored Ford F350 Gun Truck

==== Artillery and Anti-Aircraft Gun ====
- Self-Propelled Artillery
  - 122mm BM-21 Grad Multiple Rocket Launcher
- Mortar
  - 60mm M-224
- Anti-Aircraft Gun
  - ZU-23-2

== Puntland Police Force ==
The Puntland security apparatus also operates its own police force. The latter includes a Special Protection Unit.

== Puntland Intelligence Agency ==
The Puntland Intelligence Agency is the intelligence bureau of Puntland's military. It was officially established in 2001 as the Puntland Intelligence Service during the rule of President Abdullahi Yusuf Ahmed, with help from the United States. The agency principally operates in the Puntland region, where it serves as the main intelligence and counter-terrorism wing of the government's security forces.

== Puntland Maritime Police Force ==
The Puntland Maritime Police Force is a locally recruited, professional maritime security force. It is primarily aimed at preventing, detecting and eradicating piracy, illegal fishing, and other illicit activity off of the coast of Somalia, in addition to generally safeguarding the nation's marine resources.

In addition, the Force provides logistics support to humanitarian efforts, such as repairing wells; delivering relief supplies, medical supplies, food, and water; rehabilitating hospitals and clinics; and refurbishing roads, airports, and other infrastructure. It also offers skills training programs to local communities.

As of March 2012, the PMPF has around 500 troops. The Force is eventually expected to comprise 1,000 soldiers.

== Agreements ==
In January 2015, President of Puntland Abdiweli Mohamed Ali signed a bilateral agreement with the EU head of Civilian Operations Commander for all Civilian Common Security Defence Policy (CSDP) Missions Kenneth Dean, which stipulates that a new EUCAP Nestor base will be established in Garowe. The European Union's Maritime Capacity Building Mission in the Horn of Africa and Western Indian Ocean (EUCAP Nestor) is mandated to assist nations in the latter regions to strengthen their maritime defense capabilities. As such, the new base aims to advance cooperation, to train Puntland forces in maritime security and anti-terrorism, particularly vis-a-vis ground operations, and to develop and firm up on extant maritime security instruments and legislation.

== See also ==
- Military of Somalia
- Galmudug security forces
- Somali Salvation Democratic Front
