= Bilal al-Sudani =

Somali terrorist (died 2023)

- Born: 1984 or 1990; Sudan
- Died: 25 January 2023; Somalia
- Cause of death: Assassination

Bilal al-Sudani, also known as Suhayl Salim Abd el-Rahman (died 25 January 2023) was a member of the al-Shabaab insurgency and later a member of Islamic State in Somalia.

Al-Sudani was designated a terrorist by the U.S. in 2012 for his work in helping to finance foreigners traveling to al-Shabaab training camps. Al-Sudani later began to help finance ISIS in Africa and other countries including Afghanistan. In 2022, the U.S. accused al-Sudani of working with an Ethiopian national who was in South Africa as an asylum seeker, Abdella Hussein Abadigga, to recruit young men in South Africa for ISIS and send them to weapons training camps. He was likely in charge of the IS office in Somalia, which was influential in Afghanistan, the Democratic Republic of the Congo and Mozambique.

Al-Sudani was killed by SEAL Team Six operators in a raid on a cave system in northern Somalia on January 25, 2023. The raid was intended to lead to his capture. Ten members of Al-Sudani's group were also killed in the operation with no civilian or U.S. casualties.
