= Balidhidhin District =

Balidhidin
- District

- Location within Somalia Location within Horn of Africa Location within Africa
- Coordinates: 10°52′40.66″N 50°23′32.68″E
- Country: Somalia: Puntland
- Region: Bari
- Time zone: UTC+3 (EAT)

Balidhidin (Somali: Degmada Balidhidin) is a district in the northeastern Bari region of Somalia.
