= Abdul Qadir Mumin =

Somali Islamist and leader of the Islamic State in Somalia

- Cabdulqaadir Muumin
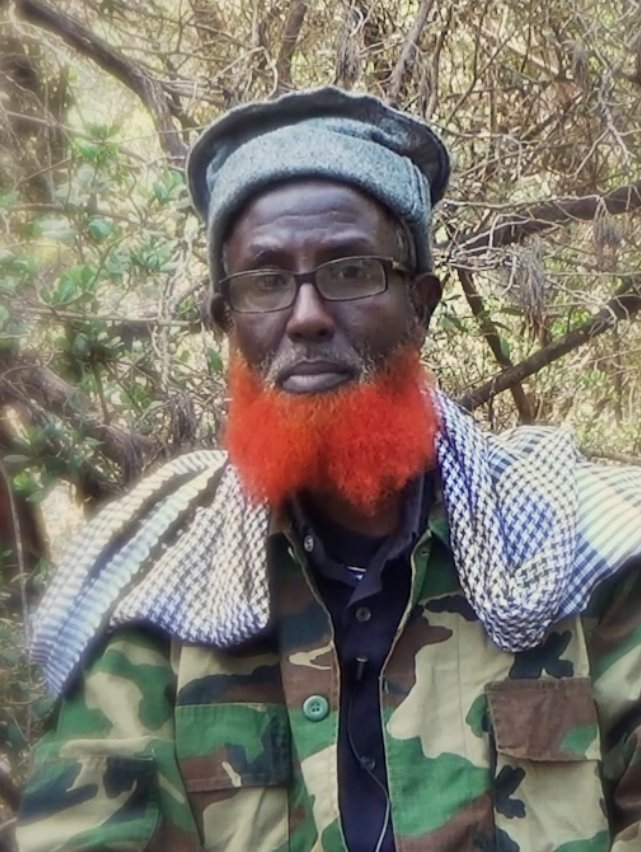
- Mumin in 2015

Emir of the Islamic State in Somalia's al-Karrar office
- Incumbent
- Assumed office 2023

Personal details
- Born: Between 1950 (age 75–76) and 1953 (age 72–73) Qandala, Puntland, Trust Territory of Somaliland
- Citizenship: Somalia; UK; Sweden
- Spouse: Muna Abdule
- Children: 3

Abdul Qādir Mūmin (Arabic: عبد القادر مؤمن; born between 1950 and 1953) is a Somali Islamist militant who serves as the leader of the Islamic State in Somalia's al-Karrar office. He was formerly a senior religious authority in al-Shabaab.

== Biography ==
Born in Qandala, Puntland, Somalia, to a Majerteen Ali Saleban parents, Mūmin arrived to the United Kingdom in 2005–2006, having lived 1990–2003 in a north-eastern district Angered of Gothenburg, Sweden. While in the UK, he preached at Masjid Quba in Leicester and the Greenwich Islamic Centre in London. In 2010, he took part in a press conference alongside the ex-Guantanamo Bay prisoner Moazzam Begg for the charity CAGE, which was launching a report calling American war crimes in East Africa.

A few months later he fled to Somalia, after coming under investigation by MI5 for radicalising young men. Mūmin had given sermons at the mosque attended by Michael Adebolajo, one of the Islamic terrorists responsible for the murder of British soldier Lee Rigby. He joined al-Shabaab and publicly burned his British passport before a crowd of supporters in a mosque. His wife, the British Somali national Muna Abdule, and their son and two daughters remained in the UK.

On 22 October 2015, he pledged allegiance to Abu Bakr al-Baghdadi and the Islamic State, creating the "Islamic State in Somalia" (Abnaa ul-Calipha). He is located in the Galgala region, in Puntland, Somalia.

On 31 August 2016, he was designated as a 'Specially Designated Global Terrorist' by the United States Department of State.

By 2023, he was replaced as leader of ISS by Abdirahman Fahiye Isse Mohamud.

On 31 May 2024, he was targeted by a US airstrike southeast of Bosaso, Somalia, that killed three militants, but his death was unconfirmed.
