= Puntland Maritime Police Force =

Military unit

Puntland Maritime Police Force (PMPF) cidanka boliiska badda puntland Ciidamada Badda Dawladda Puntland
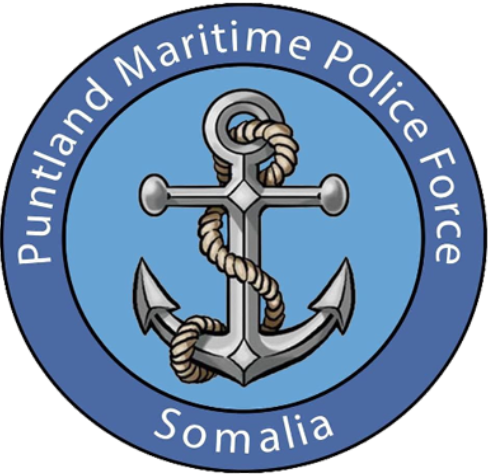
- Emblem of the Puntland Maritime Police Force

Agency overview
- Formed: 4 October 2010; 16 years ago
- Employees: 8 thousand personal
- Volunteers: 571
- Annual budget: $185 m USD (2024)

Jurisdictional structure
- National agency (Operations jurisdiction): Puntland
- Operations jurisdiction: Puntland
- Legal jurisdiction: Government of Puntland
- Governing body: Puntland

Operational structure
- Headquarters: Bandar Siyada, Puntland
- Agency executives: Abdirabbi Abdisamad, Director General & commander; Mohamoud Silal, Deputy Director General; Admiral Abdirahman Mohamed, Operation Commander; Abdirisak Husain, Coordinator
- Parent agency: Ministry of Security (Puntland)

Website
- pmpf.so

The Puntland Maritime Police Force (PMPF) is a security force based in Puntland, a semi-autonomous region in northeastern Somalia. As of May 2024, the PMPF had around 4800 personnel. The force is eventually expected to comprise 10,000 personnel.

According to Puntland authorities, it is primarily aimed at preventing, detecting and eradicating piracy, illegal fishing, and other illicit activity off of the coast of Somalia, in addition to generally safeguarding marine resources. Yet the UN Somalia and Eritrea Monitoring Group (SEMG) said in 2012 that its primary focus was internal security operations.

As of April 2014, Abdinasir Bihi Sofe serves as the force's Director. Its main base is located in Qaw, Bari.

== Establishment ==
The PMPF was established after the Puntland administration in 2010 passed Somalia's first Anti-Piracy Law. According to the former president of Puntland Abdirahman Mohamud Farole, the Force was formed in response to requests from the international community and the U.N. Security Council to establish local anti-piracy law enforcement institutions. Erik Prince, founder of Blackwater and former US Navy SEAL, said he came up with the idea to create an anti-piracy force.

The Puntland Maritime Police Force has been supported by the United Arab Emirates since its formation in 2010. UAE sources acknowledged supporting the force in 2013. As of 2014, it continues to receive support from the UAE.

Prior to its deployment, United Nations bodies have questioned both the mission and legality of the force. According to a UN working group, its chain of command is not clear, as its legal basis in Somali or Puntland law is not documented, and it appears to report only to the President of Puntland. In 2012, before the PMPF was deployed, the Monitoring group said that its primary focus was internal security operations.

The UN Mercenaries' Working Group reported after its visit to Puntland in December 2012 that "...financing for the PMPF has now dried up and that the Government of Puntland is seeking ways of continuing to finance its operations". However, on 28 March 2014, another Puntland-UAE agreement stipulated that the UAE government would continue to support the PMPF. This support has been provided in violation of the arms embargo upon Somalia, stipulated in United Nations Security Council Resolution 1425 (2002).

== Training ==
Following a Transitional Federal Government-Puntland cooperative agreement in August 2011 calling for the creation of a Somali Marine Force, of which the already established PMPF would form a part, the Puntland administration resumed training of PMPF naval officials.

=== Sterling Corporate Services ===
The UAE-funded Puntland Maritime Police Force training program was initially conducted by Saracen International/Sterling Corporate Services (SCS). The UN Somalia and Eritrea Monitoring Group (SEMG), alleged that the SCS and PMPF in several reports had formed a "private army" in contravention of the 1992 arms embargo against Somalia. The Somali Federal Parliament demanded that the Federal Government explain the presence of "foreign companies illegally operating in the country", and in January 2012 the TFG Minister of Information stated that the government would terminate its relationship with Saracen: a decision that it considered "binding on all Somali territories." The Puntland authorities reportedly defied the decision.

The Monitoring Group also alleged that a trainee died after being "hogtied with his arms and feet bound behind his back and beaten"—an accusation disputed by SCS, which described the incident as “Somali-on-Somali violence” that was not indicative of the overall training program. It said that the allegations did not reflect on the professional training, but that professional training was needed.

The Puntland government shortly afterwards said that the "SEMG reports to the U.N. Security Council have been drafted in an unprofessional manner and intentionally biased against the Puntland Government's consistent anti-piracy activities."

Following closed meetings between the PMPF's UAE sponsor and UN officials to ensure compliance with international law, the Puntland authorities opted to end Sterling's work contract. According to SCS's lawyer, Wilna Lubbe, the "contract was terminated by agreement as the Government of Puntland now has the capacity to proceed with its anti-piracy programme".

In December 2012, a mission by the UN Mercenaries' Working Group assessed the deployment of private military and security companies in Somalia. It criticized the PMPF for operating outside of the Federal national security framework. It reported that the force exclusively reported to President Abdirahman Farole; that it had launched operations unrelated to piracy; and impeded Abdiweli Ali Gaas campaigning for the Puntland presidency in Bosaso. Faiza Patel, the Chairperson of the Working Group, consequently recommended that "the authorities must integrate the force into the agreed-upon Somali national security structure and ensure that it is used strictly for the purposes for which it is intended."

The delegation concluded that the PMPF was trained by South African personnel from Sterling Corporate Services. It also indicated that although it had received reports suggesting that Sterling/Saracen had previously been found to have violated the UN arms embargo on Somalia and that the firm's activities went beyond training, less foreign personnel were still involved in the PMPF's operations and most of Saracen's activities had already ended.

=== Bancroft Global Development ===
In June 2012, the Puntland government indicated that it had contracted the U.S.-based private military firm Bancroft Global Development to take over general training of the Puntland Maritime Police Force. Bancroft also serves as a subcontractor for the African Union Mission to Somalia (AMISOM).

Al Venter, the author of a 2017 book about Somalia, reported that Erik Prince, the founder and former CEO of Blackwater, and a former US Navy SEAL, partnered with a former South African special forces soldier Lafras Luitingh, formerly of Executive Outcomes, to play a role in the Bancroft initiative.

The UN Mercenaries' Working Group later reported that Bancroft had informed the Group that it had not signed any agreements with the PMPF. However, the company indicated that it had conducted a comprehensive assessment and audit of the PMPF, the Force's facilities, military equipment and inventory, and staff medical checks. Bancroft officials noted breaches of the arms embargo that was at the time in effect on Somalia. The firm subsequently declined to provide support to the PMPF. Bancroft also reportedly submitted its assessment document to AMISOM, with authorization pending to forward it to the EU and other international bodies.

The Japan Coast Guard is providing additional training in maritime law enforcement to PMPF officials.

== Recruitment ==
In January 2012, the PMPF began an initial recruitment intake of volunteers. The men then took part in a six-month training course and were supplied with boats and trucks.

In late February 2012, the PMPF commenced a second recruitment cohort of more than 400 volunteers. The new recruits were issued basic equipment, eating utensils and sleeping gear, and underwent medical, physical and administrative exams. They began a six-week basic training course on March 10, 2012, with formal training expected to last six months. Several senior, junior and non-commissioned officers of the Puntland Security Force were chosen to accompany the new recruits during their training regimen. The former are slated to compose the principal leadership for future training and counter-piracy missions. Additional recruitment drives are also scheduled during the year.

== Deployments ==
Since its establishment, the PMPF has been deployed in various missions. During the 2011 drought, the force assisted in humanitarian efforts, including a water and food supply program in southern Puntland.

=== Anti-piracy missions ===
In March 2012, the PMPF dispatched a unit of officers and support elements to the littoral town of Eyl at the request of the municipal authorities. The move is intended to ensure permanent security and anti-piracy protection in the area, and to support the local administration. To this end, PMPF personnel are expected to establish a Forward Operating Base (FOB) in the town earmarked for counter-piracy activities, to begin construction of an airstrip, and to engage in water-drilling.

Between May 6, 2012, and June 8, 2012, the Puntland Maritime Police Force began intensive counter-piracy operations in the littoral areas of the Bari, Nugal and Karkar regions. The PMPF reportedly succeeded in blocking off potential pirate ransom supply routes, in the process forcing two hijacked vessels to leave the Bari seaboard for the Indian Ocean. Aboard one of the commandeered ships was wanted pirate leader Isse Yuluh, who had been implicated in at least one hostage-taking plot, among other illicit maritime activity.

On May 26, 2012, a PMPF unit led by Commander Colonel Abdirizak Dirie Farah and accompanied by senior Puntland government officials was deployed to the coastal Hafun district. The following day, the Force began local security operations and apprehended 11 pirates that had established a base in the area. The police also impounded a Toyota truck, seven AK-47 assault rifles and one heavy machine gun from the site. Among the captured individuals was Mohamed Mohamud Mohamed Hassan (Dhafoor), a pirate sought by the Puntland authorities for his purported role in the hijacking of commercial vessels along the Gulf of Aden and Indian Ocean shipping lanes. Dhafoor was also reportedly among the group of pirates who had killed five PMPF personnel and wounded eight others during a PMPF hostage rescue effort in March 2011 in Hul Anod, where a kidnapped Danish family had been held.

In June 2012, PMPF personnel met with communities on the Hafun seaboard and outlined plans for the latter's continued cooperation with the Force. A PMPF unit is also reportedly stationed in the area.

In response to local reports that pirates were holding vessels that they had seized off of the coast of Bargaal, the PMPF were dispatched to the district on June 4, 2012, to begin security operations. Unidentified helicopters were subsequently reported to have been combing the littoral for the captured ships. Commander Farah indicated that the pirates boarded the docked vessels and fled the district for the Indian Ocean upon learning of the PMPF's presence.

According to a Puntland government official, Puntland security forces launched an aerial assault on June 6, 2012, targeting a wanted pirate leader in the village of Bali Dhidid. Personnel aboard a helicopter fired on a house where pirate leader Isse Yuluh was believed to have been staying, possibly injuring him. Three vehicles were reportedly destroyed in the attack, but Yuluh managed to escape.

On November 30, 2023, the Puntland maritime police force responded to a recent attempted pirate hijacking in the Gulf of Aden. Following this incident, patrols in the region under the leadership of Commander Abdullahi Mohamed Ahmed, have been significantly increased. Patrols have been doubled, and they operating on a 24-hour rotation to enhance security and deter pirate activities.

Commander Abdullahi Mohamed Ahmed acknowledged the challenges faced by the maritime force, which extend beyond piracy. Despite initial success in dealing with pirate activities, recent developments, including the presence of militant groups like al-Shabab and IS (Islamic State), have added complexity to their mission. Consequently, the maritime force is now not only focused on combating piracy but also on addressing threats posed by these extremist groups.

==== MV Iceberg 1 ====
On December 23, 2012, PMPF troops concluded a two-week siege operation against the Panama-flagged MV Iceberg 1 in the coastal town of Gara'ad. The vessel had been hijacked over two years prior, on March 29, 2010. Acting on gathered intelligence that pirates were holding the commandeered ship's crew on board as opposed to separate locations, the Force first attempted a direct rescue of the hostages on December 10. When this failed, PMPF units blockaded the vessel, killing three pirates and capturing three others who were attempting to smuggle in weapons reinforcements. The MV Iceberg 1 was subsequently taken into Puntland government custody, and all 22 of its rescued crew were given medical attention.

=== 2013 Somalia cyclone ===
In November 2013, during the 2013 Somalia cyclone, the Puntland Maritime Police Force participated in relief efforts overseen by the Puntland Disaster Management and Rescue committee. PMPF units assisted in the transportation of emergency supplies, including blankets, tents, non-perishable food items and medicines to the impacted parts of the region. They also took photographs using special boats, which captured images of submerged earth roads connecting urban centers with rural areas, as well as flattened houses and fallen trees blocking off parts of the Bosaso-Galkayo highway.

=== Illegal activities ===
On November 16, 2012, the PMPF captured a North Korea flagged vessel, the MV Daesan, which had been dumping 5,000 metric tons of waste in Puntland waters. The ship had originally been transporting cement from Oman to Mogadishu, but was turned away by the port's business authorities due to water-induced spoilage. The vessel was later spotted 13 nautical miles to the east of Bosaso, where it had reportedly been unloading toxic substances into the sea over a period of several days. Acting on the gathered intelligence, the Force deployed both air and maritime support to the area and took into custody the 33 person crew. On November 18, 2012, the Puntland government issued a press release condemning the vessel owners' and crew's waste dumping, which it described as an "illegal and environmentally destructive practice". It also indicated that the case would be tried in court.

In December 2012, a group of eight rogue PMPF fighters guarding the impounded MV Daesan and its crew briefly hijacked the vessel. However, the Puntland authorities managed to retrieve the ship within a period of 24 hours. The fighters were subsequently detained in the Puntland military court on December 22, pending a trial. According to a Puntland government press release, the hijacking was a plot orchestrated by politically motivated individuals and pirates, with the aim of distracting attention away from the PMPF's concurrent rescue attempts of the long-held MV Iceberg 1 and its crew.

On April 24, 2013, PMPF personnel arrested 78 Iranian sailors that were illicitly fishing off the coast of Bosaso. The Force was acting on a tip that illegal fishing vessels were operating between the Elanyo and Qow districts, with five such boats later found in the area. The foreign ship crew was accompanied by 12 Somali personal guards, who briefly engaged PMPF troops in a shootout before also being apprehended. According to Commander Farah, the sailors and their guards are expected to face the Puntland courts. The PMPF also plans more such operations against illegal fishing vessels.

On 7 May 2014, the Puntland Maritime Police Force, in collaboration with local residents, seized four Yemeni fishing boats that were reportedly fishing illegally in Puntland territorial waters in the Bari region. According to PMPF Commander Abdirisak Dirie Farah, 62 Yemenis and 7 Somali nationals were arrested during the operation, which took place near the town of Bargal. The suspects were being held in the coastal town for further interrogations.

== Equipment ==
The Puntland Maritime Police Force possesses both maritime and land security capacities. The force has three Ayres Thrush low-wing aircraft fitted with armored cockpits and engines to protect the crew and aircraft from hostile ground fire. The aircraft are each armed with a US built small gatling gun, and US built air to surface missiles. It also operates an Antonov An-26 transport aircraft and an Aérospatiale Alouette III helicopter.

For naval capabilities, it operates three rigid-hull inflatable boats (RHIBs), which are armed with 12.7 millimetres (0.50 in) DShK heavy machine guns. The boats are propelled by a pair of 400 shaft horsepower (300 kW) inboard diesel engines. The force's air element drop fuel barrels, at sea, to extend the boats' range.

== Anniversary ==
On October 4, 2012, the PMPF celebrated its second anniversary at an event held in Bosaso. The gathering was attended by various Somali and foreign officials, and included an aviation show by the first locally trained pilots since the outbreak of the civil war.

== Leadership ==
Name
Abdirahman Haji	Director
Abdirizak Dirie Farah	Commander
Ahmed Said (Qalombi)	Deputy Director
