= Puntland Dervish Force =

Armed force of Puntland

Puntland Dervish Force Ciidamada Daraawiishta Puntland
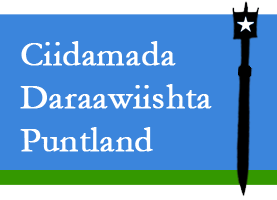
- Active: 1998-present
- Country: Puntland
- Branch: Ministry of Security (Puntland)
- Type: Gendarmerie; Light infantry
- Role: Gendarmerie; Counter-insurgency; Counter-terrorism; Internal security
- Size: 5,000
- Garrison/HQ: Garowe
- Mottos: Puntland, People and Patriot (Somali) Diinta, Dadka iyo Dalka Puntland
- Engagements: War in Somalia; Islamic State insurgency in Puntland; Qandala campaign; Counter-terrorism operations; Somali Civil War; War in Somalia (2006–2009); Global War on Terrorism; War against the Islamic State; Galgala campaign; Puntland-Somaliland dispute

Commanders
- Current commander: General Adan Abdi Hashi
- Notable commanders: Lieutenant general Said Mohamed Hersy; Major general Abshir Abdi Jama; Brigadier general Jimale Jama Takar; Colonel Abdullahi Yusuf Ahmed

The Puntland Dervish Force (PDF, Somali: Ciidamadda Daraawiishta Puntland ama Ciidamadda Difaaca Dawladda Puntland, Arabic: قوات الدراويش في أرض البنط ) is the armed forces of the Puntland, a state in northeastern Somalia.

== History ==
Following the outbreak of the Somali Civil War in 1991, a homegrown constitutional conference was held in Garowe in 1998 over a period of three months. Attended by the area's political elite, traditional elders (Issims), members of the business community, intellectuals and other civil society representatives, the autonomous Puntland State of Somalia was subsequently officially established so as to deliver services to the population, offer security, facilitate trade, and interact with both domestic and international partners. The Puntland Security Force (PSF) was subsequently formed by the regional government.

Since the founding of the state in 1998, the Puntland Dervish Force has operated in Puntland and throughout Somalia. Commanders and senior officials of the military are appointed by a qualified panel approved by the Council of Ministers.

The Puntland security apparatus has an independent military judiciary, which during peacetime only adjudges military proceedings. Retired members of the Force are also constitutionally guaranteed pensions.

== Equipment ==
- Individual Weapons
  - Assault Rifle
    - AKM (Assault Rifle – 7.62×39mm)
    - AK-74 (Assault Rifle – 5.45×39mm)
    - PK machine gun (General-purpose machine gun – 7.62×54mmR)
  - Sniper Rifle
    - SVD Dragunov (Sniper Rifle – 7.62×54mmR)
  - Anti-Tank Explosive
    - RPG-7 (rocket-propelled grenade launcher – 40 mm)
- Vehicles
  - Main Battle Tank
    - T-54/T-55
  - Armoured Personnel Carrier
    - BTR-60
    - Fiat 6614
  - Military trucks
    - Renault GBC 180 (6×6)
    - M939 Truck (6×6)
  - Pickup trucks
    - Toyota Land Cruiser J79
    - Toyota Hilux
    - Nissan Frontier
    - Armored Ford F350 Gun Truck
- Artillery and heavy machine guns
  - Heavy machine guns
    - 12.7mm DShK
    - 12.7mm NSV
  - Self-Propelled Artillery
    - 122mm BM-21 Grad Multiple Rocket Launcher
  - Mortar
    - 60mm M-224
  - Anti-Aircraft Gun
    - ZU-23-2
