= Council of Ministers of Somalia =

Council of Ministers of the Federal Government of Somalia

The Council of Ministers of the Federal Government of Somalia consists of Ministers appointed by the Prime Minister. The Prime Minister may dismiss members of the council, and new appointees must again be approved by the Parliament. The Council meets weekly on Thursdays in Mogadishu. There may be additional meetings if circumstances require it. The Prime Minister chairs the meetings.

== Constitutional and legal basis ==
=== Appointment ===
Article 97, Section 3 of the Constitution of the Somalia says that the Prime Minister

shall appoint deputy prime ministers, ministers, state ministers, and deputy ministers. Those eligible for membership of the Council of Ministers may be, but shall not be limited to, members of the House of the People of the Federal Parliament.

== Functions of Council ==
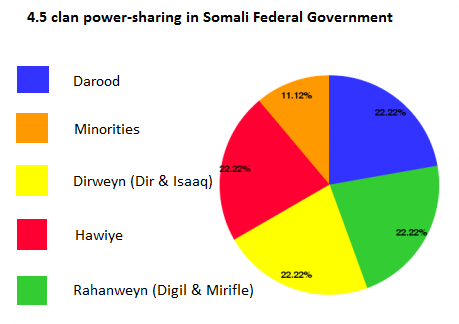
4.5 clan power-sharing system

An outline of the functions of the council are as follow:

- Formulate the overall government policy and implement it;
- Approve and implement administrative regulations, in accordance with the law;
- Prepare draft laws, and table them before the House of the People of the Federal Parliament;
- To set the budget and finance of the country.
  - The government is allowed to generate revenues from the people through the collection of taxes, fines, summons, custom duties, fees, etc.
- To formulate national economic policies and development programs.
  - The council is responsible to formulate various development programs and projects for the development of the country. Examples are the New Economic Policy (NEP), the National Development Policy (NDP), and the National Vision Policy (NVP).
- Implement laws, ensure national security, and protect state interests;
  - Law is proposed by the Executive and introduce in Parliament with the 1st, 2nd, and 3rd readings for approval.
  - Most provisions for the amendments of the constitution requires a 2/3 majority of the total number of Parliament.
- Appoint and dismiss senior public officials;
- Propose the appointment or dismissal of ambassadors, consuls and diplomats;
- Exercise any other power conferred upon it by the Constitution or by other laws.

== Council officials ==
On 19 October 2020, the Prime Minister Mohamed Hussein Roble submitted his nomination for the Council Members of the Federal Republic of Somalia and on 24 October 2020 they were approved by the parliament. They are currently as follows:

=== Council members ===
| Office | Incumbent | Party | Since |
Presidency
| President | Hassan Sheikh Mohamud | UPD | 12 May 2022 |
| Vice President | Hassan Sheikh Mohamud | UPD | 12 May 2022 |
| Prime Minister | Hamza Abdi Barre | UPD | 26 June 2022 |
| Deputy Prime Minister | Salah Ahmed Jama | Independent | 2 August 2022 |
Ministers
| Ministry of Foreign Affairs (Somalia) | Abdisalam Abdi Ali | UPD | 7 April 2024 |
| Ministry of Interior and Federal Affairs | Ali Yusuf Hosh | Independent | 7 April 2024 |
| Ministry of Finance | Bihi Egeh | Independent | 9 July 2023 |
| Ministry of Defense | Ahmed Moalim Fiqi | UPD | 2 August 2022 |
| Ministry of Education | Farah Sh. Abdulkadir Mohamed | UPD | 2 August 2022 |
| Ministry of Justice and Constitutional Affairs | Hassan Moalim | UPD | 2 August 2022 |
| Ministry of Family and Human Rights Development | Khadija Al Makhzoumi | Independent | 5 January 2025 |
| Ministry of Planning and International Cooperation | Mohamud Abdirahman Sheikh Farah (Beenebeene) | UPD | 2 August 2022 |
| Ministry of Ports and Marine Transport | Abdulkadir Nur jama | Independent | 21 October 2024 |
| Ministry of Air Transport and Aviation | Fardawsa Osman Egal | Independent | 29 March 2017 |
| Ministry of Communications and Technology | Mohamed Adam Moalim Ali | Independent | 17 April 2024 |
| Ministry of Livestock, Forestry and Range | Hassan Mohamed Elaay | Independent | 2 August 2022 |
| Ministry of Commerce and Industry | Mahmoud Ahmed Aden (Geesood) | Independent | 20 March 2025 |
| Ministry of Public Works and Reconstruction | Elmi Mohamud Nur | UPD | 27 October 2024 |
| Ministry of Religious Affairs | Mukhtar Robow | Independent | 5 August 2018 |
| Ministry of Internal Security | Abdulahi Sheik Ismael Fara-Tag | UPD | 4 Abril 2024 |
| Ministry of Agriculture | Mohamed Hayir Maareeye | Independent | 29 January 2024 |
| Ministry of Health and Social Care (Somalia) | Ali Haji Adan | UPD | 2 August 2022 |
| Ministry of Fisheries and Marine Resources | Abdullahi Bidhan Warsame | Independent | 5 August 2018 |
| Ministry of Youth and Sports | Mohamed Bare Mohamud | Independent | 24 October 2020 |
| Ministry of Information | Daud Aweys | Independent | 24 October 2020 |
| Minister of Labour | Duran Ahmed Farah | Independent | 7 April 2019 |
| Ministry of Energy and Water Resources | Abdullahi Bidhan Warsame | Independent | 29 January 2024 |
| Ministry of Petroleum and Mineral Resources | Dahir Shire Mohamed | Independent | 24 October 2020 |

== See also ==
- Federal Parliament of Somalia
