= Mohamud =

Mohamud is a masculine given name of Somali origin. It is derived from the Arabic name Mahmud. Notable people with the name include:

== Given name ==
- Mohamud Ibrihim Adan, Somali politician
- Mohamud Sayid Aden, Somali politician
- Mohamud Ali (footballer) (born 1994), Somali footballer
- Mohamud Abdi Gaab, Somali politician
- Mohamud Muse Hersi (1937–2017), Somali military officer and politician
- Mohamud Hayir Ibrahim (born 1981), Somali politician
- Mohamud Ali Magan, Somali politician
- Mohamud Noor (born 1977/78), American politician
- Mohamud Ali Saleh, Kenyan diplomat
- Mohamud Siraji (born 1988), Somali politician
- Mohamud Hassan Suleiman, Somali politician
- Mohamud Siad Togane (born 1947), Somali-Canadian poet and peace activist
- Mohamud Moalin Yahya, Somali politician

== Surname ==
- Hassan Sheikh Mohamud (born 1955), Somali politician

== See also ==
- Mahmud
