= Ministry of Constitutional Affairs (Somalia) =

Government ministry of Somalia

- Wasaaradda Arrimaha Dastuurka
- Coat of arms of Somalia

Agency overview
- Formed: 2012
- Jurisdiction: Somalia
- Headquarters: Mogadishu
- Agency executive: Abdirahman Hoosh Jibril, Minister of Constitutional affairs
- Parent agency: Cabinet of Somalia

The Ministry of Constitutional Affairs (Somali: Wasaaradda Arrimaha Dastuurka) is a ministry responsible for the constitution in Somalia. The current Minister of constitutional affairs is Abdirahman Hoosh Jibril.

== See also ==
- Agriculture in Somalia
