= Abdirashid Mohamed Ahmed =

Somali politician

Abdirashid Mohamed Ahmed Cabdirashiid Maxamad Axmad عبدالرشيد محمد أحمد
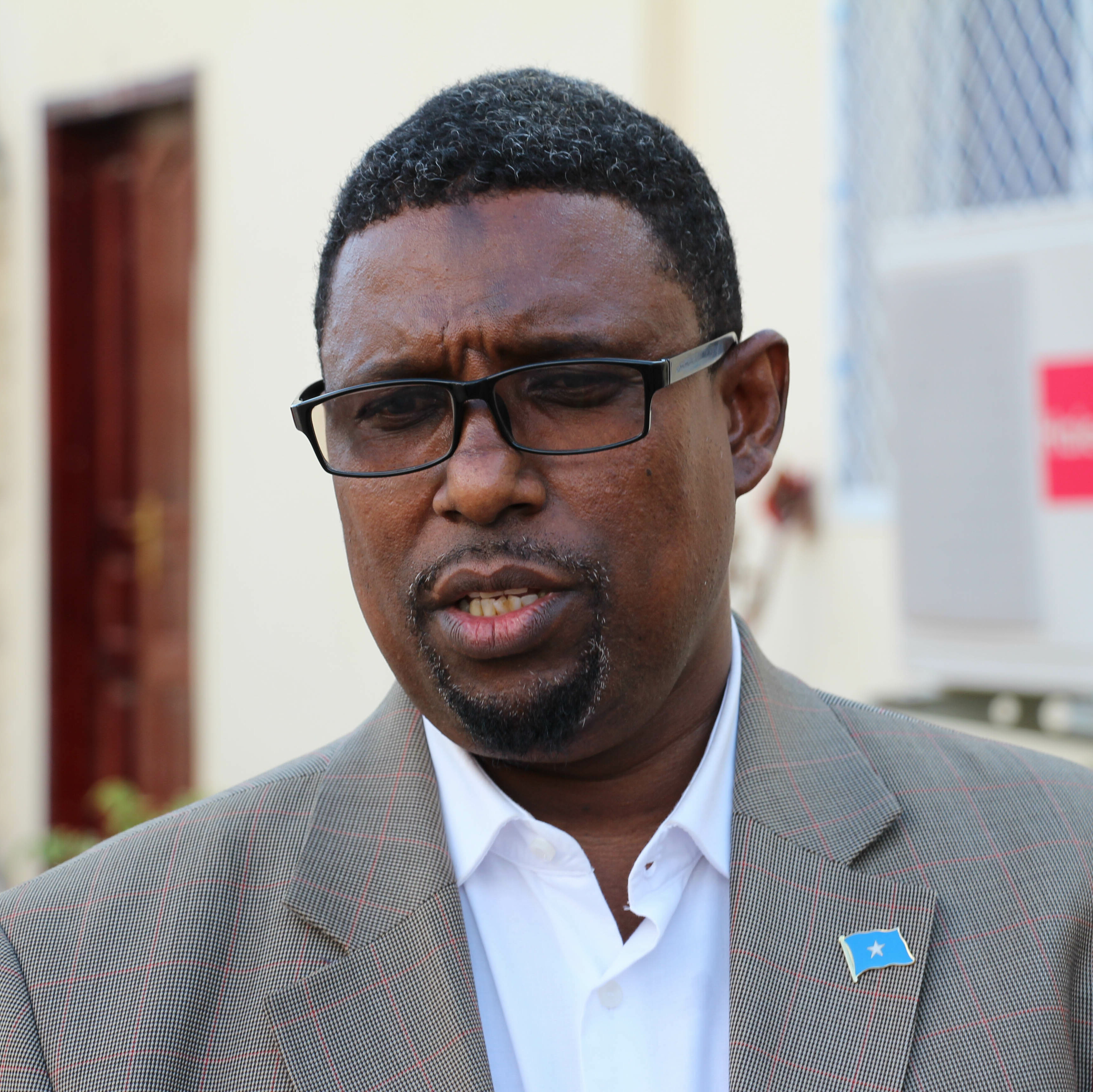

Minister of Petroleum and Mineral Resources of Somalia
- President: Mohamed Abdullahi Mohamed
- Prime Minister: Mohamed Hussein Roble
- Succeeded by: Abdirisak Omar Mohamed

Minister of Commerce and Industry of Somalia
- In office 24 November 2015 – 29 March 2017
- President: Hassan Sheikh Mohamud
- Prime Minister: Omar Abdirashid Ali Sharmarke
- Succeeded by: Khadra Ahmed Dualeh

Personal details
- Party: Independent
- Occupation: Politician

Abdirashid Mohamed Ahmed (Somali: Cabdirashiid Maxamad Axmad, Arabic: عبد الرشيد محمد أحمد) is a Somali politician. He was the former Minister of Commerce and Industry from 2015 to 2017, and Minister of Petroleum and Mineral Resources from 2021 to 2022. He hails from Gendershe a sub clan from Sheikhal.

Political offices
Preceded by	Minister of Commerce and Industry of Somalia; 24 November 2015 – 29 March 2017	Succeeded by Khadra Ahmed Dualeh
Preceded by	Minister of Petroleum and Mineral Resources of Somalia c. 2021 – 12 August 2022	Succeeded by Mohamed Abdirizak Mohamud
