= Ministry of Aviation (Somalia) =

Government ministry of Somalia

Ministry of Transport & Civil Aviation
- Coat of arms of Somalia

Agency overview
- Formed: 2012
- Jurisdiction: Somalia
- Headquarters: Mogadishu
- Minister responsible: Mr. Mohamed Farah Nuh
- Agency executive: Minister
- Parent agency: Cabinet of Somalia
- Website: https://motca.gov.so/

The Ministry of Transport & Civil Aviation is a ministry responsible for overseeing air transport and all things related to aviation in Somalia. The current Minister of Aviation is Mr. Mohamed Farah Nuh.

== See also ==
- Agriculture in Somalia
