= Jamal Arab Yusuf =

Director of Puntland Intelligence Agency

- Jamaal Carab Yusuf
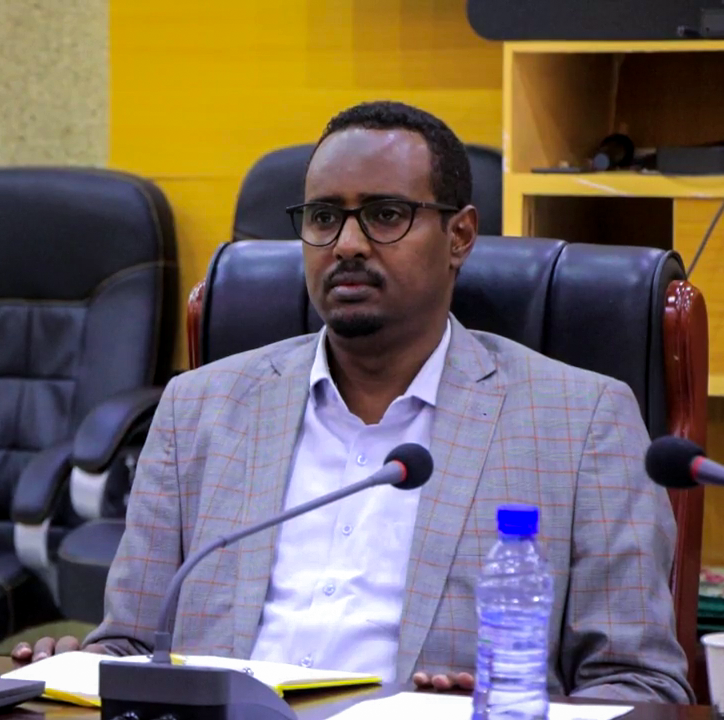

Director general of the Puntland Intelligence Agency
- Incumbent
- Assumed office 24 September 2022
- President: Said Abdullahi Deni
- Vice President: Ahmed Elmi Osman (2024); Ilyas Osman Lugator (—2024)

Director general of the Puntland TV and Radio
- In office 2 July 2016 – 5 February 2020
- President: Abdiweli Gaas; Said Abdullahi Deni (—2019)
- Vice President: Abdihakim Abdullahi Haji Omar (2019); Ahmed Elmi Osman
- Preceded by: Abdifatah Nur Ashkir
- Succeeded by: Abdifatah Nur Ashkir

Puntland Minister of Planning
- In office 30 March 2022 – 5 October 2022
- President: Said Abdullahi Deni
- Vice President: Ahmed Elmi Osman
- Preceded by: Abdiqafar Elmi Hange
- Succeeded by: Mohamed Said Farole

Personal details
- Born: Galkayo, Mudug
- Citizenship: Somalia
- Education: Omar Samatar Secondary School (high school); Amity University, Noida (Bachelor’s degree); Kampala University (Master’s degree)

Brig Gen Jamal Arab Yusuf Jibril (Arabic: جمال عرب يوسف) is a Somali politician and military official who was served as Director of the Puntland TV and Radio, He was appointed and replaces Abdiqafar Elmi Hange as the Puntland Minister of Planning and succeeded by Mohamed Said Farole. He is currently serving as the Director general of the Puntland Intelligence Agency.

== Life and education ==
Jamal was born and raised in Galkayo, the capital of Mudug Region, and he completed primary and secondary education galkayo district, and graduating Omar Samatar Secondary School in 2005. He obtained a Bachelor’s degree in Financial Management and Investment from Amity University, Noida, India in 2012, and a Master’s degree in Diplomacy and International Relations from the University of Kampala, Uganda in 2013.

== Career ==
He worked at the Federal Government's Bureau of Immigration and Citizenship Office in Galkayo between 2007 and 2010, and worked with a number of international organizations operating in Somalia between 2010 and 2016.

On July 2, 2016, the president Abdiweli Gaas, issued a presidential decree and appointed Jamal Arab as Director of the Puntland TV and Radio and he was succeeded by Abdifatah Nur Ashkir.

On February 5, 2020, President of Puntland Said Abdullahi Deni issued a presidential decree dismissing him from the director general, and appointing his deputy Dahir Abdulkadir Ahmed (Aflow) as acting director.

On March 30, 2022, Puntland President Said Abdullahi Deni appointed him Minister of Planning and International Cooperation, succeeding Minister Abdiqafar Elmi Hange, who was elected as a member of the Federal Parliament of Somalia.

On September 23, 2022, Jamal Arab was appointed director of the Puntland Intelligence Agency, succeeding Mukhtar Mohamed Hassan Geti and was promoted as the rank of brigadier general (Somali: Sareeye Guuto) by President Deni. After Mohamed Said Farole was appointed on September 23, 2022, as his successor in the Ministry of Planning and International Cooperation, he vacated and transferred the office on October 5, 2022.

Political offices
Preceded by Abdiqafar Elmi Hange	Puntland minister of planning March 2022 – October 2022	Succeeded by Mohamed Said Farole
