= Daud Mohamed Omar =

Current Puntland Mininster of Planning

- Daud Bisinle داود محمد عمر
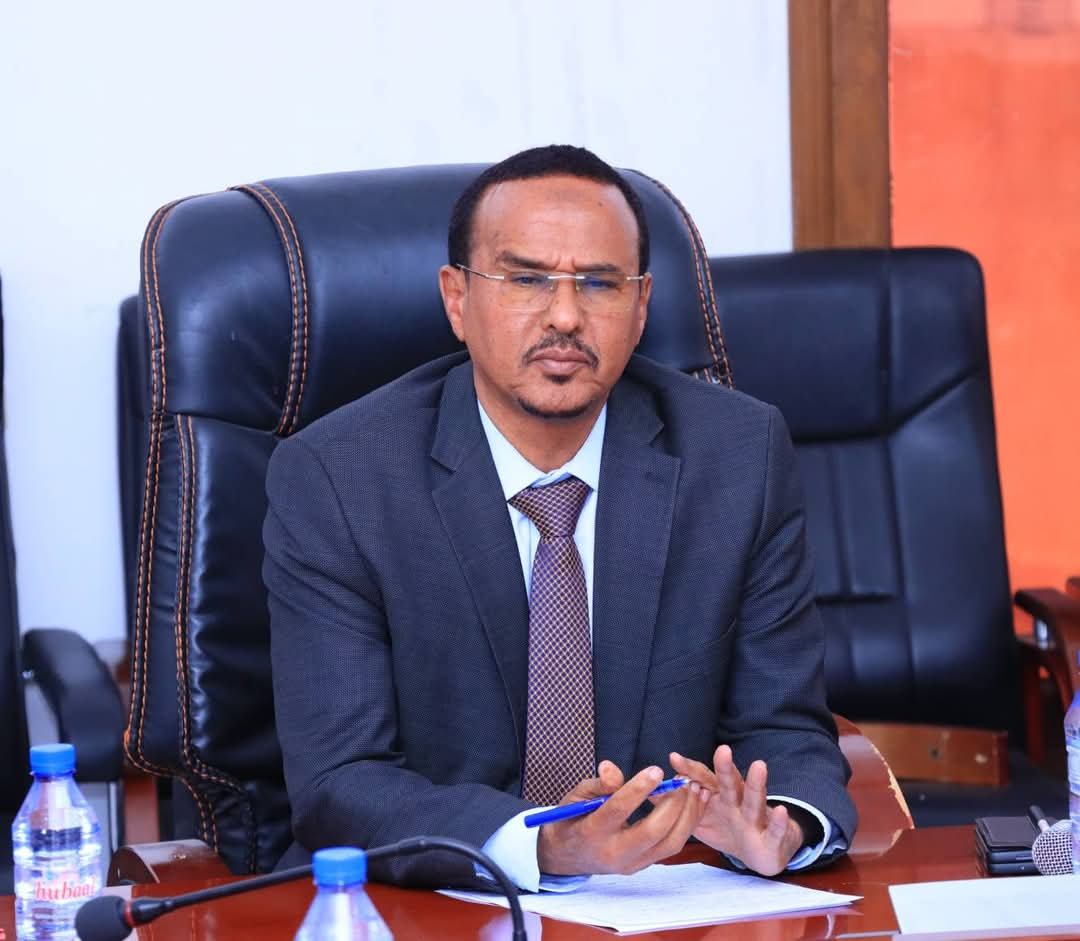

Puntland Minister of Planning
- In office 25 January 2009 – 8 January 2014
- President: Abdirahman Farole
- Vice President: Abdisamad Ali Shire

Minister of Petroleum and Mineral Resources
- In office 17 January 2014 – 27 January 2015
- President: Hassan Sheikh Mohamud
- Prime Minister: Abdiweli Sheikh Ahmed
- Succeeded by: Abdirizak Omar Mohamed

Puntland Minister of Planning
- Incumbent
- Assumed office 29 February 2024
- President: Said Abdullahi Deni
- Vice President: Ilyas Osman Lugator
- Preceded by: Mohamed Said Farole

Personal details
- Born: Daa'uud Maxamed Cumar; 24 February 1965 (age 61) Buuhoodle, Ceyn Somalia
- Party: Horseed

Daud Mohamed Omar (Somali: Daa'uud Maxamed Cumar "Daa'uud Bisinle", Arabic: داود محمد عمر), AKA "Daud Bisinle" currently serving as the Puntland Minister of Planning and Cooperation, appointed by President Said Abdullahi Deni for the second term in 2024. He previously held this position from 25 January 2009 until 8 January 2014 during Presidency of Abdirahman Farole. Bisinle also served as the Minister of Petroleum and Mineral Resources from 17 January 2014 to 27 January 2015 during Primiership of Abdiweli Sheikh Ahmed.

== Personal life ==
Bisinle hails from the Dhulbahante sub-clan of the Harti, Darod. Bisinle coming from Buuhoodle of Cayn region.

== Career ==
=== Puntland ===
Bisinle is a senior politician of Horseed party with a various position. He served as the Puntland Minister of Planning and International Cooperation from 25 January 2009 until 8 January 2014 under President Abdirahman Farole. During this period, he was a vocal advocate and spokesperson for the Farole government, often voicing opposition to the Transitional Federal Government led by Sharif Sheikh Ahmed.

On 29 February 2024, President Said Abdullahi Deni appointed Bisinle as the Puntland Minister of Planning and Cooperation for a second term, as he replaces Mohamed Said Farole.

=== Somalia ===
On January 17, 2014, Bisinle was appointed Somali Minister of Petroleum and Mineral Resources by Prime Minister Abdiweli Sheikh Ahmed. His term in office concluded on January 27, 2015, when the newly appointed Prime Minister Omar Abdirashid Ali Sharmarke named Abdirizak Omar Mohamed as his successor.

During 2016 Somali parliamentary election he was elected as Member Federal Parliament of Somalia until 2022.

Political offices
Preceded by Mohamed Said Farole	Puntland minister of planning 2024–present	Incumbent
