= Ministry of Religious Affairs (Somalia) =

Government ministry of Somalia

Ministry of Religious Affairs of Somalia
- Coat of arms of Somalia

Agency overview
- Formed: 2012
- Jurisdiction: Somalia
- Headquarters: Mogadishu
- Agency executive: Limaan Ali, Minister of Religious Affairs
- Parent agency: Cabinet of Somalia

The Ministry of Religious Affairs is a ministry responsible for monitoring religious affairs in Somalia, including both the national religion and minority religions. The current Minister of Religious Affairs is Mukhtar Robow.

== See also ==
- Agriculture in Somalia
