= Somali diaspora =

Somali emigrants and their descendants

Qurbajoogta Soomaaliyeed
- Somalis around the world

Total population
- 1,998,764 (2015 UN estimate)

Regions with significant populations
- Arabian Peninsula, Europe, North America, Oceania, South Africa
- United States: 247,769 (2024)
- United Kingdom: 176,645 (2021)
- United Arab Emirates: 101,000 (2020)
- Sweden: 70,170
- Canada: 62,550
- Yemen: 46,750
- Norway: 44,100
- South Africa: 27,000-40,000
- Netherlands: 39,465
- Germany: 38,675
- Saudi Arabia: 34,000
- Finland: 24,365 (2022)
- Denmark: 21,210
- Australia: 18,401
- Turkey: 10,815 (2024)
- Italy: 8,228
- Austria: 7,101
- Switzerland: 7,025
- Belgium: 2,627
- Libya: 2,500
- New Zealand: 1,617
- Ireland: 1,495

Languages
- Somali (mother tongue), English (working language), Italian (working language), Arabic (working language)

Religion
- Vast majority: Islam (Sunni and Sufism)

Somali diaspora (Somali: Qurbajoogta Soomaaliyeed) refers to ethnic Somalis who reside in areas of the world outside of Greater Somalia. The Somali Civil War greatly increased the size of the Somali diaspora, as many Somalis moved from Somalia (Note: including Somaliland) primarily to Europe, North America, Oceania, North Africa, West Africa, Middle East, South Asia and Southern Africa. There are also Somali populations in Asia. The UN estimates that in 2015, approximately 2 million people from Somalia were living outside of the country's borders.

== Global distribution ==
The distribution of Somalis abroad is uncertain, primarily due to confusion between the number of ethnic Somalis and the number of Somalia nationals. Whereas most recent Somali migrants in the diaspora emigrated as refugees and asylum seekers, many have since obtained either permanent residence or citizenship. A 2008 publication estimated the ethnic Somali international migrant population as 1,010,000, including around 300,000 in East and South Africa, 250,000 in the United States and Canada, 250,000 in Europe, 200,000 in the Middle East, and 10,000 in Australia, New Zealand and Asia. By the start of the Yemeni Civil War, the number of Somalis in Yemen was estimated to be 500,000.

UN migration estimates of the international migrant stock 2015 suggest that 1,998,764 people from Somalia were living abroad.

As of 31 March 2020, the number of refugees from Somalia registered with the UNHCR was 763,933. This is down from a peak of almost 990,000 in June 2013. The majority of these individuals were registered in Kenya (256,408), Yemen (253,755) and Ethiopia (198,670). According to USAID, many of the displaced persons in these adjacent territories are Bantus and other minorities.

== Africa ==
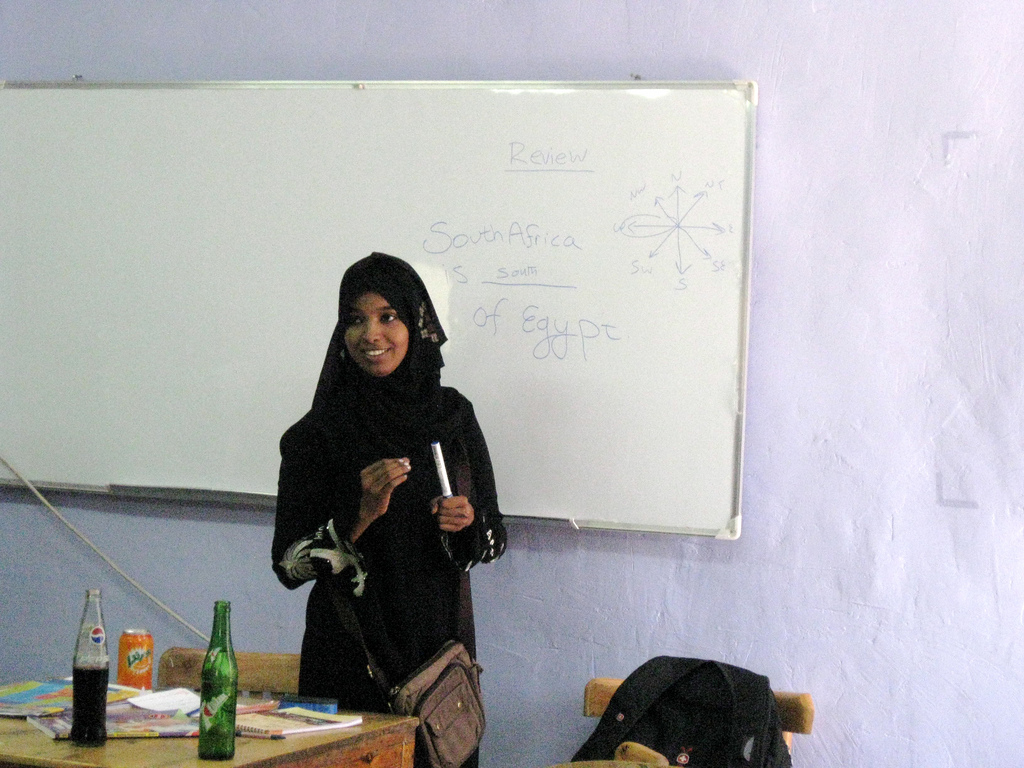
A Somali high school student in Cairo, Egypt.

About two thirds of all Somalis who live outside Somalia live in the neighbouring countries of Djibouti, Ethiopia, Kenya, and Yemen. Kenya hosted more than 313,000 in April 2017. About 255,000 were registered as refugees in Ethiopia.

Besides their traditional areas of inhabitation in Greater Somalia (the former Italian Somaliland, British Somaliland, French Somaliland, the Ogaden, and Northeastern Kenya), a Somali community mainly consisting of businesspeople, academics and students also exists in Egypt.

In addition, there is a historical Somali community in the general Sudan area. Primarily concentrated in the north and Khartoum, the expatriate community mainly consists of students, as well as some businesspeople. More recently, Somali entrepreneurs have also established themselves in South Africa, where they provide most of the retail trade in informal settlements around the Western Cape province.

== Europe ==
While the distribution of Somalis per country in Europe is difficult to measure since the Somali expatriate community on the continent has grown so quickly in recent years, there are significant Somali communities in the United Kingdom: 108,000 (2018); Sweden: 66,369 (2016); Norway: 43,196 (2016); the Netherlands: 39,465 (2016); Germany: 38,675 (2016); Denmark: 21,050 (2016); and Finland: 24,365 (2022).

=== Denmark ===
Most Somalis in Denmark emigrated from Somalia following the start of the Somali Civil War (1986-), in the period between 1995 and 2000. According to Statistics Denmark, as of 2017, there are a total 21,204 persons of Somali origin living in Denmark. Of those individuals, 11,832 are Somalia-born immigrants and 9,372 are descendants of Somalia-born persons. 8,852 individuals are citizens of Somalia (4,730 men, 4,122 women).

Between 2008 and 2013, employment among Somalis fell from 38% to 26%.

By December 2018, nearly 1000 Somalis in Denmark lost their residence permits after the Danish Immigration Service started a review of the permits in 2017. The permits were revoked as parts of Somalia are safe enough for refugees to return.

In 2018, analysis showed about 44% of Somalis in Denmark live in a parallel society and were the immigrant group which were lagging behind the most in terms of integration into Danish society.

In 2018, nearly 50% were in long-term unemployment (4 years or more).

=== Finland ===
Somalis are one of the largest ethnic minorities in Finland, and the largest group of people of non-European origin. In 2009, there were 5,570 Somali citizens, but an equal number may have received Finnish citizenship. In 2014 there were 16,721 Somali speakers in Finland. According to the Finnish newspaper Helsingin Sanomat, the number of Somali-speaking people in Finland in 2010 rose by nearly 10% in a year. In 2022, there were 24,365 people resident in Finland with a Somali background.

=== Germany ===
Somalis in Germany are citizens and residents of Germany who are of Somali descent. According to the Federal Statistical Office of Germany, as of 2020, there are a total 47,495 Somalia-born immigrants living in Germany.

=== Netherlands ===
From 1989 to 1998, the Netherlands was the second-most common European destination for Somali immigrants, only slightly behind the United Kingdom and more than double the total of the next-most common destination, Denmark. Between 2000 and 2005, there was a significant exodus of Somalis from the Netherlands to the United Kingdom, unofficially estimated to be as large as 20,000 people. The exodus was partly the result of anti-Muslim sentiments in the Netherlands in the wake of the rise of and assassination of right-wing politician Pim Fortuyn. According to the Somali European Forum, the exodus started earlier due to the Somalis not wanting to adapt to the assimilation process Dutch authorities imposed on them which they felt tried to change their culture.

In 2012, unemployment was particularly high among Somali immigrants at 37%, while unemployment for all non-Western population was at 16%. According to official statistics on immigrants, Somalis had higher unemployment and dependence on social welfare while the crime rate of young male Somalis was high. Unemployment among immigrants rose higher than for the indigenous population in the aftermath of the 2008 financial crisis.

According to a 2018 report using 2015 data, Islam takes a central role in the lives of nearly all Somalis and in many ways their religiosity increased from the already high levels in 2009.

=== Norway ===
Somalis in Norway are citizens and residents of Norway who are of Somali descent. They are the biggest African migration group in Norway. 36.5% of Somalis in Norway live in the capital Oslo. Almost all Somali in Norway have come to Norway as refugees from the Somali Civil War. In 2016, Somalis were the largest non-European migrant group in Norway.

=== Sweden ===
Somalis in Sweden (Swedish: Somalier i Sverige; Somali: Soomaalida Iswiidhan) are citizens and residents of Sweden who are Swedish of Somali ancestry or are Somali citizens. A large proportion of Somalis in Sweden emigrated to Sweden due to the Somali Civil War. Most Somalis in Sweden arrived to the country after the year 2006.

=== United Kingdom ===
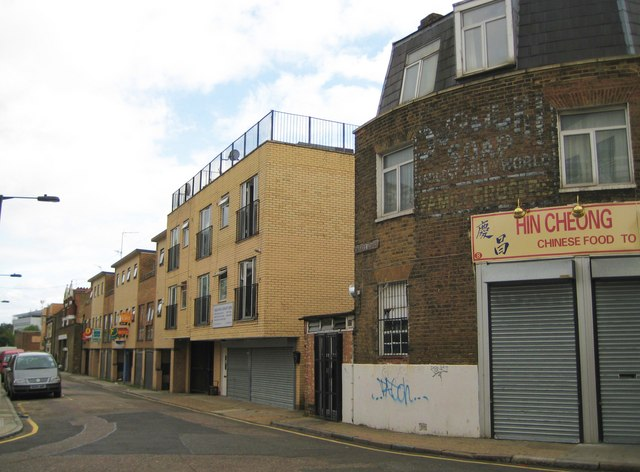
A Somali community center in London's East End (yellow brick building in the middle).

Although most Somalis in the United Kingdom are recent arrivals, the first Somalis to arrive were seamen and traders who settled in port cities in the late 19th century. By 2001, the UK census reported 43,532 Somali-born residents, making the Somali community in Britain the largest Somali expatriate population in Europe. The Office for National Statistics (ONS) estimate of 2018 indicates that 108,000 Somalis live in the UK. There has also been some secondary migration of Somalis from mainland European countries to the United Kingdom. According to the 2011 UK Census, 71.5% of Somalia-born residents in England and Wales hold a UK passport.

Established Somali communities are found in London, Birmingham, Liverpool, Cardiff and Bristol, and newer ones have formed in Manchester, Sheffield and Leicester. The Somali population in London alone accounts for roughly 78% of Britain's Somali residents.

== North America ==
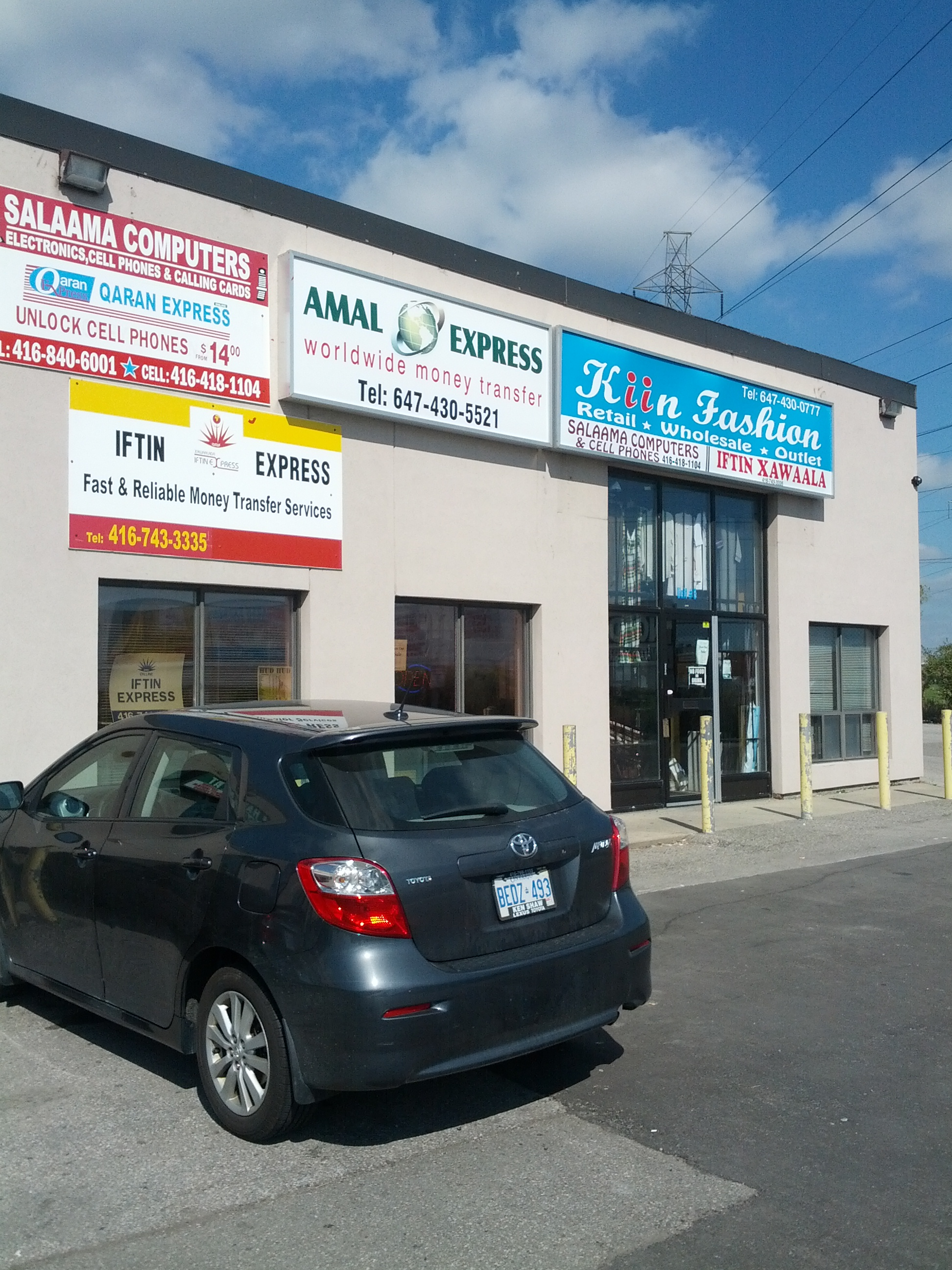
A Somali strip mall in Toronto.

=== United States ===
The earliest ethnic Somali immigrants to the United States were sailors who arrived in the 1920s, mainly from British Somaliland. In the late 1970s, more Somali immigrants followed. Not until the 1990s when the civil war broke out in Somalia did the majority of Somalis come to the US.

In 2008–2012, the largest concentration of Somalia-born people in the United States were in the Minneapolis-St. Paul-Bloomington area (17,320) of Minnesota. Other metropolitan areas with significant numbers of Somali Americans include Columbus, Ohio (10,280), Seattle-Tacoma-Bellevue in Washington (7,850), San Diego-Carlsbad-San Marcos in California (2,845), Washington, D.C.-Arlington-Alexandria in the Virginia-D.C. area (2,715), Atlanta-Sandy Springs-Marietta in Georgia (2,305), Phoenix-Mesa-Glendale in Arizona (1,965), Portland-Vancouver-Hillsboro in Oregon (1,480), Nashville-Davidson-Murfreesboro-Franklin in Tennessee (1,420), Boston-Cambridge-Quincy in Massachusetts (1,380), and other areas (28,650).

=== Canada ===
Canada hosts one of the largest Somali populations in the Western world, with the 2011 National Household Survey reporting 44,995 people claiming Somali descent, though an unofficial estimate placed the figure as high as 150,000 residents. Somalis tend to be concentrated in the southern part of the province of Ontario, especially the Ottawa and Toronto areas. The Albertan cities of Calgary and Edmonton have also seen a significant increase in their respective Somali communities over the past five years. In addition, the neighbourhood of Rexdale in the Toronto borough of Etobicoke has one of the largest Somali populations in the country. Statistics Canada's 2006 Census ranks people of Somali descent as the 69th largest ethnic group in Canada.

== Middle East ==
There is a sizable Somali community in the United Arab Emirates. Somali-owned businesses line the streets of Deira, the Dubai city centre, with only Iranians exporting more products from the city at large.

Relations between the modern-day territories of Somalia and Yemen stretch back to antiquity. A number of Somali clans trace descent to the latter region. During the colonial period, disgruntled Yemenis from the Hadhrami wars sought and received asylum in various Somali towns. Yemen in turn unconditionally opened its borders to Somali nationals following the outbreak of the civil war in Somalia in the early 1990s. In 2015, after the Saudi-led military intervention in Yemen, many returning Somali expatriates as well as various foreign nationals began emigrating from Yemen to Somaliland.

== See also ==
- Anti-Somali sentiment
- Immigration to Somalia

== Bibliography ==
- Bjork, Stephanie R and Kusow, Abdi M, From Mogadishu to Dixon: The Somali Diaspora in a Global Context, (Africa World Free Press, 1997)
