= Ali Osman (disambiguation) =

Ali Osman is a character from EastEnders

Ali Osman may also refer to:

- Ali Osman (composer) (1958–2017), Sudanese composer
- Ali Hassan Osman, Somali politician
- Ali Osman (criminal), Australian criminal involved in the 2005 Cronulla riots
