= Farole =

Farole (Somali: Faroole) is a surname. Notable people with the surname include:

- Abdirahman Farole (born 1945), Somali politician
- Mohamed Said Farole, Somali politician
