= Mohamed Ahmed Sheikh Ali =

Somali Politician

Minister of Internal Security (Somalia)
- President: Hassan Sheikh Mohamud
- Prime Minister: Hamza Abdi Bare
- Preceded by: Abdullahi Mohamed Nur
- Succeeded by: Abdulahi Sheik Ismael Fara-Tag

Personal details
- Citizenship: Somali

Mohamed Ahmed Sheikh Ali is a Somali politician who is the ambassador of the Federal Republic of Somalia to Qatar. He was the former minister of internal security for the federal republic of Somalia.
