= Ministry of Internal Security (Somalia) =

Government ministry of Somalia

- Wasaaradda Amniga
- Coat of arms of Somalia

Agency overview
- Formed: 2012
- Jurisdiction: Federal Republic of Somalia
- Headquarters: Mogadishu
- Minister responsible: Abdullahi Fartaag
- Agency executive: Minister of Internal Security
- Parent agency: Cabinet of Somalia
- Website: https://mois.gov.so/

The Ministry of Internal Security in Somalia plays a crucial role in maintaining national stability and public safety by overseeing law enforcement agencies, including the Somali Police Force, National Intelligence & Security Agency(NISA), Immigration & Citizenship Agency and others. The ministry formulates security policies to address internal threats. The ministry manages intelligence operations, coordinates emergency responses, and enhances security personnel's effectiveness. Additionally, it oversees immigration and border security, regulating entry and exit to support national security objectives.

== Organizations ==
Minister of Internal Security Role: Head of the ministry, responsible for overall leadership, policy formulation, and strategic direction.

Deputy Minister of Internal Security Role: Assists the Minister and oversees specific portfolios or departments within the ministry.

Permanent Secretary Role: Senior civil servant in the ministry, responsible for administrative and operational management.

Directorates These are specialized departments within the ministry, each focusing on specific areas of internal security:

Directorate of Police Role: Oversees the Somali Police Force, ensuring law enforcement and public order. Components: Includes various divisions such as Criminal Investigations, Traffic Police, Community Policing, etc.

Directorate of Immigration and Border Control Role: Manages immigration, visas, and border security. Components: Includes Immigration Services, Border Patrol, and Passport Services.

Directorate of National Intelligence and Security Agency (NISA) Role: Handles intelligence gathering and national security operations. Components: Includes Intelligence Analysis,

Directorate of Fire and Emergency Services Role: Manages fire prevention, firefighting, and emergency response services. Components: Includes Fire Departments, Emergency Medical Services, Disaster Response Units.

Support Services These departments provide essential administrative and logistical support to the ministry:

Human Resources and Administration Role: Manages staffing, recruitment, training, and administrative services. Components: Includes Personnel Management, Training and Development, Administrative Services.

Finance and Procurement Role: Oversees budgeting, financial management, and procurement processes. Components: Includes Budget Office, Accounting, Procurement Services.

Legal Affairs Role: Provides legal advice and ensures compliance with national and international laws. Components: Includes Legal Advisors, Compliance Officers, Policy Analysts.

Information Technology Role: Manages IT infrastructure, cybersecurity, and information systems. Components: Includes IT Support, Cybersecurity Units, Data Management.

Regional and District Offices Role: Extend the reach of the ministry to local levels, ensuring implementation of policies and coordination with regional and district security forces. Components: Regional Command Centers, District Security Offices, Local Police Stations.

Advisory Councils and Committees Role: Provide strategic advice and recommendations on various aspects of internal security. Components: Includes Security Advisory Council, Committee, Community Safety Committees.

Special Units and Task Forces Role: Address specific security challenges and threats. Components: Includes Anti-Narcotics Units, Rapid Response Teams.

Integration of the Ministry of Internal Security (Somalia) within ATMIS Roles and Collaboration Points **

Coordination and Collaboration: Operational Coordination: The MoIS works closely with ATMIS to plan and execute joint security operations aimed at combating Al-Shabaab and other insurgent groups. Strategic Alignment: The MoIS ensures that ATMIS activities align with national security policies and priorities.

Intelligence Sharing: Intelligence Coordination: The MoIS shares critical intelligence and information with ATMIS to enhance the effectiveness of security operations and counter-terrorism efforts. Joint Analysis: The MoIS participates in joint intelligence analysis and threat assessments to inform operational planning.

Law Enforcement Support: Policing Operations: The MoIS supports ATMIS in maintaining law and order in liberated areas by providing police forces and engaging in joint law enforcement operations. Community Policing: The MoIS works with ATMIS to implement community policing initiatives that build trust between security forces and local communities.

Stabilization and Governance: Stabilization Efforts: The MoIS partners with ATMIS to stabilize areas recovered from insurgent control, ensuring the restoration of government authority and public services. Governance Support: The MoIS assists in the establishment of local governance structures and the rule of law in collaboration with ATMIS.

Human Rights and Protection: Human Rights Monitoring: The MoIS collaborates with ATMIS to monitor and report on human rights issues, ensuring compliance with international standards. Civilian Protection: The MoIS works with ATMIS to protect civilians in conflict-affected areas and support humanitarian efforts.

Crisis Response and Emergency Management: Emergency Response: The MoIS coordinates with ATMIS in responding to security crises and emergencies, including terrorist attacks and natural disasters. Disaster Management: The MoIS engages in joint efforts with ATMIS to provide emergency services and humanitarian assistance to affected populations.

Public Communication and Outreach: Public Awareness: The MoIS partners with ATMIS to conduct public awareness campaigns on security issues and the role of security forces.

Community Engagement: The MoIS engages local communities in dialogue and outreach activities to build support for security initiatives and counter-extremism efforts. By fulfilling these roles, the Ministry of Internal Security (Somalia) ensures effective collaboration with ATMIS, contributing to the overall mission of achieving peace, stability, and security in Somalia.

== See also ==
- Agriculture in Somalia
