= Abdi Ahmed Hussein =

Abdi Ahmed Hussein عبدي أحمد حسين

Minister of Agriculture of Somalia
- In office 17 January 2014 – 27 January 2015
- Prime Minister: Abdiweli Sheikh Ahmed
- Succeeded by: Ali Hassan Osman

Personal details
- Party: Independent

Abdi Ahmed Hussein (Somali: Cabdi Axmed Xuseen, Arabic: عبدي أحمد حسين) is a Somali politician. From January 2014 to January 2015, he served as the Minister of Agriculture of Somalia, having been appointed to the position by Prime Minister Abdiweli Sheikh Ahmed. He was succeeded at the office by Ali Hassan Osman.
