= Ministry of Marine Resources (Somalia) =

Government ministry of Somalia

- Coat of arms of Somalia

Agency overview
- Formed: 2012
- Jurisdiction: Somalia
- Headquarters: Mogadishu
- Agency executive: Abdirahman Hashi, Minister of Marine Resources
- Parent agency: Cabinet of Somalia

The Ministry of Marine Resources is a ministry responsible for monitoring marine resources in Somalia. The last such minister was Abdirahman Hashi.

== See also ==
- Agriculture in Somalia
