= Mohamed Said Farole =

Somali politician

The Honourable Mohamed Said Farole
- Maxamed Siciid Maxamed Faroole
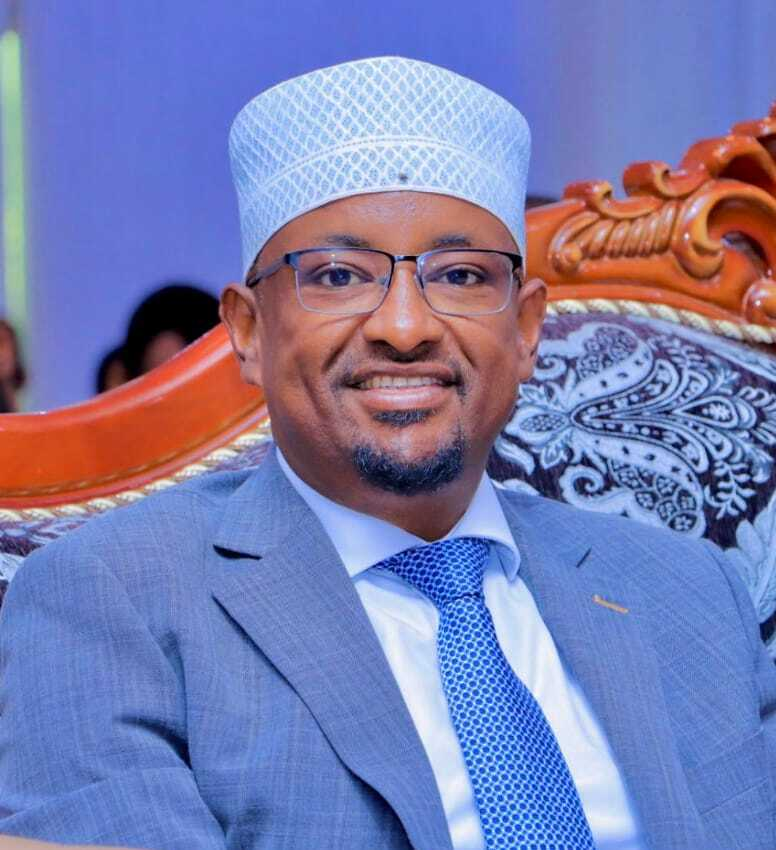

Puntland Minister of Planning
- In office September 23, 2022 – December 28, 2023
- President: Said Abdullahi Deni
- Vice President: Ahmed Elmi Osman
- Preceded by: Jamal Arab Yusuf
- Succeeded by: Daud Mohamed Omar

Personal details
- Born: 21 June 1973 (age 53) Garowe
- Education: La Trobe University; Monash University; Deakin University

Mohamed Said Mohamed Farole (Somali: Maxamed Siciid Maxamed Faroole; June 21, 1973, Arabic: محمد سعيد محمد فرولي); is a Somali politician and former Minister of the Puntland Ministry of Planning Economic Development and International Cooperation from 22 September 2022 to 28 December 2023.

== Personal life ==
Farole was born in Garowe on June 21, 1973. He is the cousin of the former President of the Puntland, Abdirahman Farole and is related to the Farole family. He hails from the Isse Mohamoud sub-clan of Majeerteen.

== Education and career ==
=== Education ===
Farole pursued his Bachelor of Medical Science at La Trobe University, Melbourne (1996-1999). He later obtained a Master of Public Health (2001-2003) from Monash University and a Diploma of Public Health in 2000. Additionally, he holds a Master of International and Community Development from Deakin University.

=== Career ===
In 2004-2005, Farole served as the Director of Public Health, showcasing expertise in the healthcare sector. He also led Global Fund projects in Puntland, contributing to regional health initiatives, his career was the initiation of a 5-year development plan in Puntland, emphasizing a strategic vision for long-term progress in the region, he coordinated the Joint Needs Assessment (JNA) of the World Bank and UNDP with collaboration between international organizations.

Farole has played a role in the non-governmental sector. He co-founded the Puntland State University (PSU) and served as the Coordinator for the KAALO NGO.

Farole was a Board Member of the Common Humanitarian Fund (CHF) from 2011 to 2013, a predecessor to the Somalia Humanitarian Fund (SHF). for the humanitarian efforts through his former membership in the Somalia Humanitarian Country Team (HCT) in 2014. Additionally, he made contributions to the Somalia Health Advisory Board and the Somalia Strategic Advisory Group.

== Minister of Planning ==
On September 23, 2022. Mohamed Said Faroole was appointed by President Said Abdullahi Deni as the Puntland Minister of Planning, and he assumed and took office from the Jamal Arab Yusuf, the newly appointed director of the Puntland Intelligence Agency starting October 5, 2022.

On December 29, 2023, Puntland Minister of Planning, Mohamed Said Farole, resigned from MoPEDIC. In his tweet, he expressed gratitude to Said Abdulahi Deni for the opportunity to serve over the past 15 months. Farole wished for peace, unity, and prosperity for Puntland, SSC, Khaatumo, and Somalia.

Political offices
Preceded by Jamal Arab Yusuf	Puntland minister of planning 2022–2023	Succeeded by Daud Mohamed Omar
