= Abdullahi Bidhan Warsame =

Minister of Energy and Water Resources
- Incumbent
- Assumed office April 7, 2024
- Preceded by: Jama Taqal Abbas

Minister of Fisheries and Marine Resources
- In office 2018 – August 2, 2022
- Preceded by: Abdirahman Mohamed Abdi Hashi
- Succeeded by: Ahmed Hassan Adan

Personal details
- Born: January 3, 1962 (age 64) Puntland, Somalia

Abdullahi Bidhan Warsame Hassan (also spelled Abdillahi Bidhan Warsame or Abdullahi Bidhaan) is a Somali politician currently serving as the Minister of Energy and Water Resources since 2024 and previously as Minister of Fisheries from 2018 to 2022.

== Biography ==
Warsame was born on January 3, 1962 in Puntland. He is part of the Darod clan. In 2020, he was roommates with Minister of Finance Mohamud Hayir Ibrahim.

Warsame began his political career in 2000. In 2018, he was appointed Minister of Fisheries and Water Resources. As Minister, he met with European Union and Chinese officials that same year; Warsame signed a deal for Chinese investment in ports for exclusive fishing rights in Somali waters. This deal with China occurred in 2021, Global Initiative Against Transnational Organized Crime (GITOC) released a report exposing Warsame and Minister of Finance Mohamud Hayir Ibrahim for creating shell company Horn Investment Agency as a way to lease Somali fishing rights to foreign companies. The revenue earned from selling fishing rights would go to Warsame, Ibrahim, and their co-conspirators. In August 2022, he was replaced as Minister of Fisheries by Ahmed Hassan Adan. In November 2022, he survived the Siege of the Villa Rossa Hotel.

On April 7, 2024, Warsame was appointed Minister of Energy and Water Resources as part of a cabinet reshuffle. In June 2024, Warsame attended an energy conference in Barcelona, Spain. Between September and October 2024, Warsame and other ministers met with the World Bank to coordinate electrification of hospitals and other areas. Warsame hosted a forum in March 2025 to announce electrification processes in Mogadishu. In May 2025, Warsame met with energy ministers from Khatumo State. In October 2025, Warsame said that energy progress in the country had come from a variety of private companies, and that he planned to halve fuel imports by 2028. He also said that 49% of Somalis don't have electricity.
