= Khadra Ahmed Dualeh =

Somalian politician and diplomat

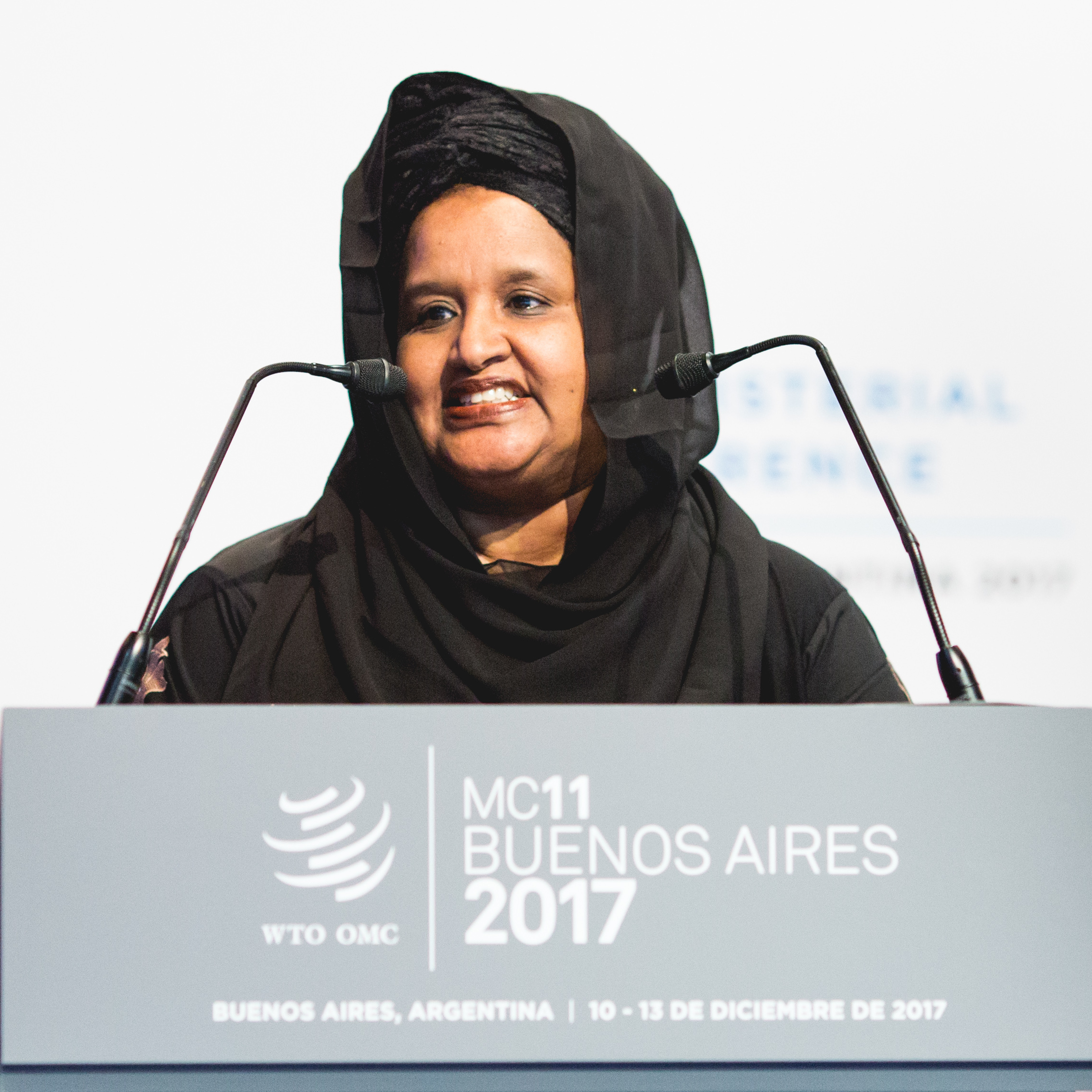
- Dualeh at a World Trade Organization conference in 2017

Permanent Representative of Somalia to the United Nations Office at Geneva and Ambassador of Somalia to Switzerland
- In office 2024–2025
- President: Hassan Sheikh Mohamud
- Prime Minister: Hassan Ali Khaire

Minister of Commerce and Industry of the Federal Government of Somalia
- In office 2017–2018
- President: Mohamed Abdullahi Mohamed
- Prime Minister: Hassan Ali Khaire
- Preceded by: Abdirashid Mohamed Ahmed
- Succeeded by: Mohamed Abdi Hayir

Personal details
- Born: Somalia
- Parent: Ahmed Haji Dualeh Abdullah
- Education: Buffalo State University; New York University; Carnegie Mellon University in Qatar

Khadra Ahmed Dualeh is a Somalian politician and diplomat. She was formerly the Somalian Minister of Commerce and Industry from 2017 to 2018 and the Permanent Representative of Somalia to the United Nations Office at Geneva (UNOG) from 2024 to 2025. Since April 2025, she has served as Ambassador of Somalia to the United Nations Office at Vienna (UNOV).

== Biography ==
Dualeh was born in Somalia. Her father was Ahmed Haji Dualeh Abdullah, a Somali independence activist, and her paternal aunt is sociologist and politician Raqiya Haji Dualeh Abdalla. She has three siblings, Harbi, Nura and Ayanle.

Dualeh studied for a Bachelor of Science in Business Studies and Office Administration at Buffalo State University, then a Master of Arts in International Education at New York University. Before entering diplomatic service, she was Director of Professional Development at Carnegie Mellon University in Qatar.

Dualeh held the positions of Director General of the Department of International Cooperation at the Ministry of Planning and International Coordination from 2013 to 2017. In 2017, Dualeh attended celebrations following three years of Somalia being polio free.

Dualeh was the Somali Minister of Commerce and Industry of the Federal Government of Somalia from 2017, succeeding Abdirashid Mohamed Ahmed. In this post, she worked on strengthening trade with Uganda and encouraged foreign investment into Somalia, overseeing the development of the Memorandum on the Foreign Trade Regime (MFTR). In November 2017, she attended the international Save Somalia Conference in London, England.

Dualeh was dismissed from her position by Prime Minister of Somalia Hassan Ali Khayre in January 2018. She was succeeded by Mohamed Abdi Hayir.

In 2024, Dualeh was appointed as the Ambassador of Somalia to Austria and Switzerland and as the Permanent Representative of Somalia to the United Nations Office at Geneva, presenting her credentials to Director General Tatiana Valovaya. As Ambassador, Dualeh participated in the 2024 United Nations Human Rights Council Retreat in Rabat, Morocco. She presented her credentials to President of Switzerland, Karin Keller-Sutter in January 2025.

In April 2025, Dualeh was also appointed as the Ambassador of Somalia to the United Nations Office at Vienna (UNOV). She presented her credentials to Director General, Ghada Waly.

In October 2024, alongside the Permanent Representative of the United Kingdom, Simon Manley, Dualeh introduced a United Nations resolution to extend human rights reforms and renew the mandate of the Independent Expert on Somalia. She has also organized the President of Somalia’s engagement at the 2025 World Economic Forum in Davos, Switzerland, was part of the Somali delegations to the Global Meeting On Chemical and Waste Management in Geneva and the International Telecommunication Union (ITU)'s Global ICT Summit, and has supported a meeting held to resume a bilateral labour agreement between Somalia and Turkey.
