= Puntland Intelligence Security Agency =

National intelligence agency of Puntland

- Hay’ada Sirdoonka iyo Nabad-sugidda Puntland وكالة الاستخبارات والامن في بونتلاند
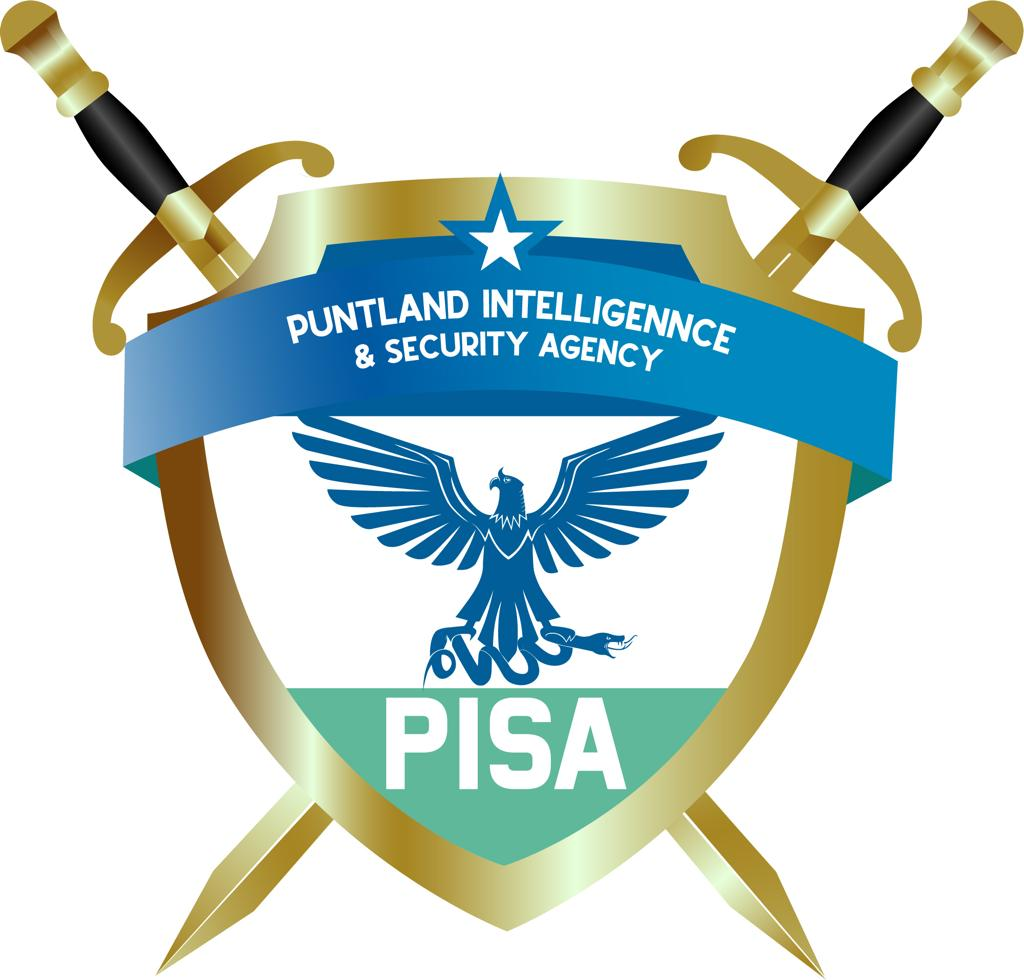
- Logo

Agency overview
- Formed: 2001
- Preceding agencies: Puntland Intelligence Service (2001–2010); Puntland Intelligence Agency (2010–2019) Puntland Intelligence Security Agency {PISA} (2019–present)
- Jurisdiction: Government of Puntland
- Headquarters: Garowe, Puntland
- Employees: Classified
- Annual budget: Classified
- Agency executive: Gen. Jamal Arab Yusuf, Director & Commander
- Parent department: Ministry of Security (Puntland)
- Parent agency: Minister of Security and DDR

The Puntland Intelligence Security Agency (Somali: Hay’ada Sirdoonka iyo Nabadsugidda Puntland, Arabic: وكالة الاستخبارات والامن في بونتلاند) is an Intelligence and Security Agency based in capital Garoowe, Puntland. It was officially established in 2001 as Puntland Intelligence Service during the rule of President Abdullahi Yusuf Ahmed, with assistance from the United States. The agency operates throughout Somalia, but principally in the autonomous Puntland region, where it serves as the main intelligence and counter-terrorism wing of the Puntland Security Force.

The agency took the name Puntland Intelligence Agency in 2010 after undergoing extensive reform to streamline it to work side by side with other government agencies across Somalia. These reforms were instituted by former Puntland President Abdirahman Farole. Then the agency took another name in 2019 was Puntland Intelligency Security Agency (PISA).

== Contemporary history ==
Then known as Puntland Intelligence Service, the PIS was founded in 2001 with help from the United States Intelligence Community to act as a buffer against possible Islamist movements. Its responsibilities include surveillance, investigation and arrest of suspected terrorists; monitoring of ports and airports; protection of foreigners.

It has led the fight against Al-Qaeda in Galgala, Puntland known as the Galgala Campaign. On February 26, 2012, the self-proclaimed leader of the Galgala militants reaffirmed their allegiance with Al-Qaeda. The Puntland Intelligence Agency is trained and supported by US counter-terrorism agencies via their branches in Djibouti and is currently the strongest armed wing of Puntland's security apparatus.

On 23 December 2022, the President of Puntland replaced Mukhtar Jeyte and appointed Jamal Arab Yusuf.
