= Mohamed Abdi Hayir =

Somali politician

Mohamed Abdi Hayir MP

Minister of Industry and Trade
- Incumbent
- Assumed office 4 January 2018
- President: Mohamed Abdullahi Mohamed
- Prime Minister: Hassan Ali Khaire
- Preceded by: Khadra Ahmed Dualeh

Minister of Electricity and Water of Somalia
- In office 2013 – March 2017
- President: Hassan Sheikh Mohamud
- Prime Minister: Omar Abdirashid Ali Sharmarke
- Succeeded by: Salim Aliyow Ibrow

Personal details
- Party: Independent

Mohamed Abdi Hayir is a Somali politician. He has served as the Minister of Agriculture and Irrigation in Somalia since 2018. Before this, he was the Minister of Electricity and Water for Somalia. He was appointed to that position in late 2015 by the then Prime Minister of Somalia, Omar Abdirashid Ali Sharmarke.
