= Ali Haji Adan =

Somali health minister

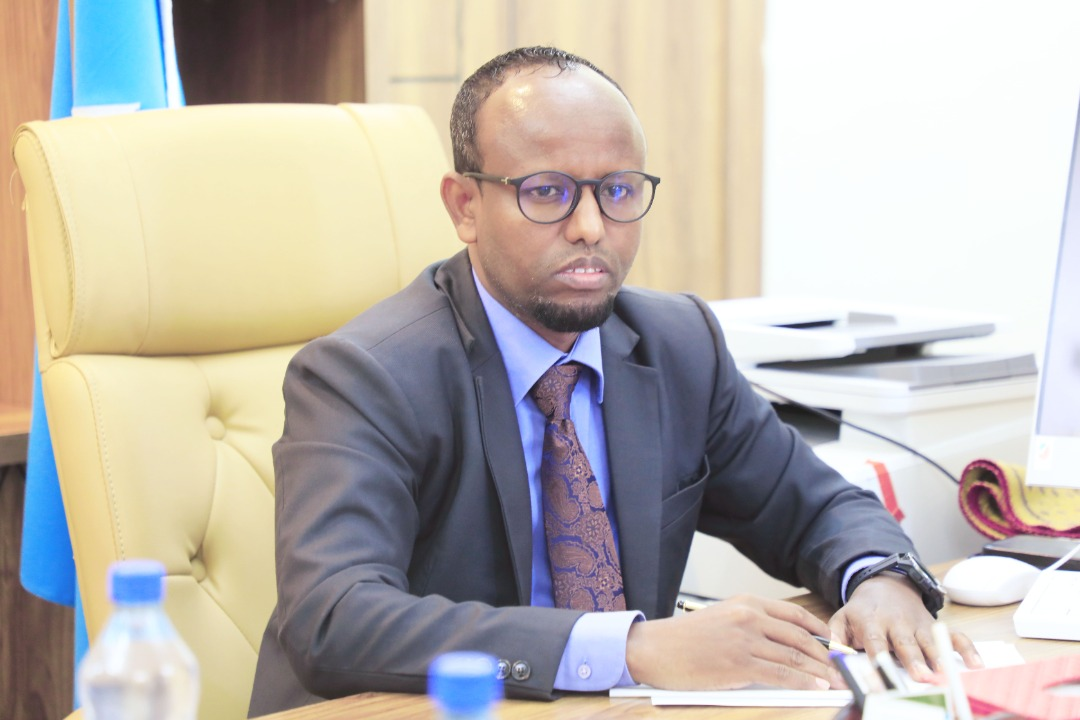

Minister for Health and Social Care
- Incumbent
- Assumed office 2 August 2022
- President: Hassan Sheikh Mohamud
- Prime Minister: Hamza Abdi Barre

Personal details
- Born: El Ali
- Occupation: Dr And Politician

Ali Haji Adan is the Minister of Health and Social Care of the Federal Government of Somalia.
