= Mohamed Olow Barrow =

Somali politician and government minister

Mohamud Olow Barrow محمد أولو بارو

Minister of Fisheries and Marine Resources of Somalia
- In office 17 January 2014 – 16 January 2015
- Prime Minister: Abdiweli Sheikh Ahmed
- Succeeded by: Mohamed Moktar Ibrahim

Personal details
- Born: Somalia
- Died: 16 January 2015 Mogadishu, Somalia
- Party: Independent

Mohamud Olow Barrow Somali: Maxamud Colow Barrow, Arabic: محمد أولو بارو was a Somali politician. He served as the Minister of Fisheries and Marine Resources of Somalia, having been appointed to the position on 17 January 2014 by Prime Minister Abdiweli Sheikh Ahmed. Barrow died on 16 January 2015 in Mogadishu. A state funeral was held for him later the same day in the capital, which was attended by the late official's family and friends, President Hassan Sheikh Mohamud, Prime Minister Omar Abdirashid Ali Sharmarke, Parliament Speaker Mohamed Osman Jawari, other federal government leaders, and the general public.
