= Ali Hassan Osman =

Somali politician

Mohamed Ali Hared

Minister of Agriculture
- In office 27 January 2015 – 29 March 2017
- President: Hassan Sheikh Mohamud
- Prime Minister: Omar Abdirashid Ali Sharmarke
- Succeeded by: Said Hussein Iid

Personal details
- Born: Somalia
- Party: Independent

Ali Hassan Osman is a Somali politician. He belongs to the hawaadle clan. He is the former minister of agriculture of Somalia, having been appointed to the position on 27 January 2015 by the now former prime minister Omar Abdirashid Ali Sharmarke.
