= Abdullahi Fartaag =

Somalian military commander

Abdullahi Sheik Ismael Fartaag
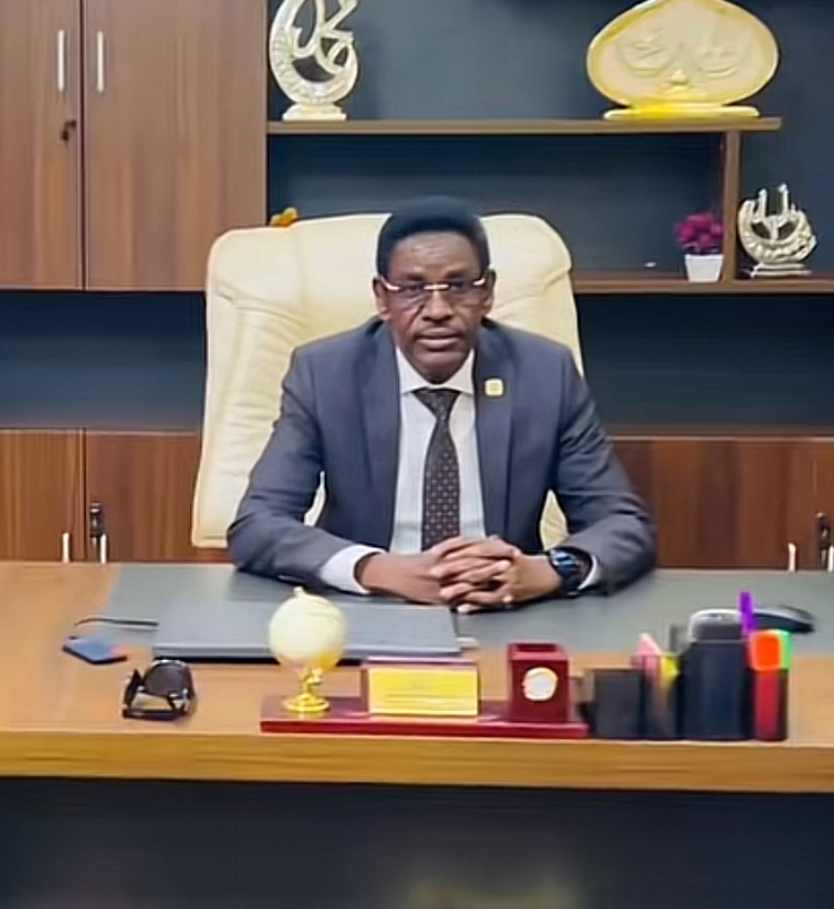
- Cabdullaahi Sheekh Ismaaciil (Fartaag), Wasiirka Amniga Gudaha ee Soomaaliya, Muqdisho, 2025.

Minister of Internal Security (Somalia)
- Incumbent
- Assumed office April 2024
- President: Hassan Sheikh Mohamud
- Preceded by: Mohamed Ahmed Sheikh Ali

First Vice President of Jubaland
- In office 2013 – May 2016
- President: Ahmed Mohamed Islam
- Succeeded by: Mohamud Sayid Aden

Former Head of Juba Valley Alliance

Senator

Personal details
- Occupation: politician

Abdullahi Sheikh Ismail Fartaag is a Somali politician and current Minister of internal Security of Somalia since April 2024 and a Member of Somali senate. He also served as the first vice president of Jubaland state of Somalia from 2013 to May 2016. He was former commander in the army of the Transitional Federal Government (TFG) of the Republic of Somalia.

He was Head of the Juba Valley Alliance (JVA) before it folded under the command of the TFG, serving under Barre Adan Shire Hiiraale before and after the merger of forces.

On October 6, 2006, vowed to retake Kismayo after its abandonment to the Islamic Courts Union (ICU), but their counterattacks at the time failed. JVA officials in Jilib were also reported arrested by the ICU.

On October 22, SomaliNet reported Gen. Ismael Fartaag was claimed to have been captured and knifed to death after the fall of the town of Bu'aale to the ICU. However, on November 4, these reports proved false when Gen. Fartaag was reported alive and well in Bardhere.

On November 5, there were reports of the "unlocking" (presumably, the beginning) of training of 1,300 Ahlu Suna Wal Jama'a clerics in Bardhere to fight on behalf of the JVA/TFG. These recruits were to replace the losses suffered by the JVA in October. The number began as 700, but rapidly increased to 1,300. Gen. Fartaag was reported to explain, "They are volunteers attending to defend their territory from the invasion of foreigners alongside the Islamic courts."

On December 19, Gen. Fartaag was named as the commander of the TFG forces defending Bardhere from attack. However, the ICU collapsed after that in the course of the Battle of Baidoa, and Bardhere never fell to them.
