= Mukhtar Robow =

Somali al-Shabaab member (born 1969)

Mukhtar Robow Ali
- مختار روبو
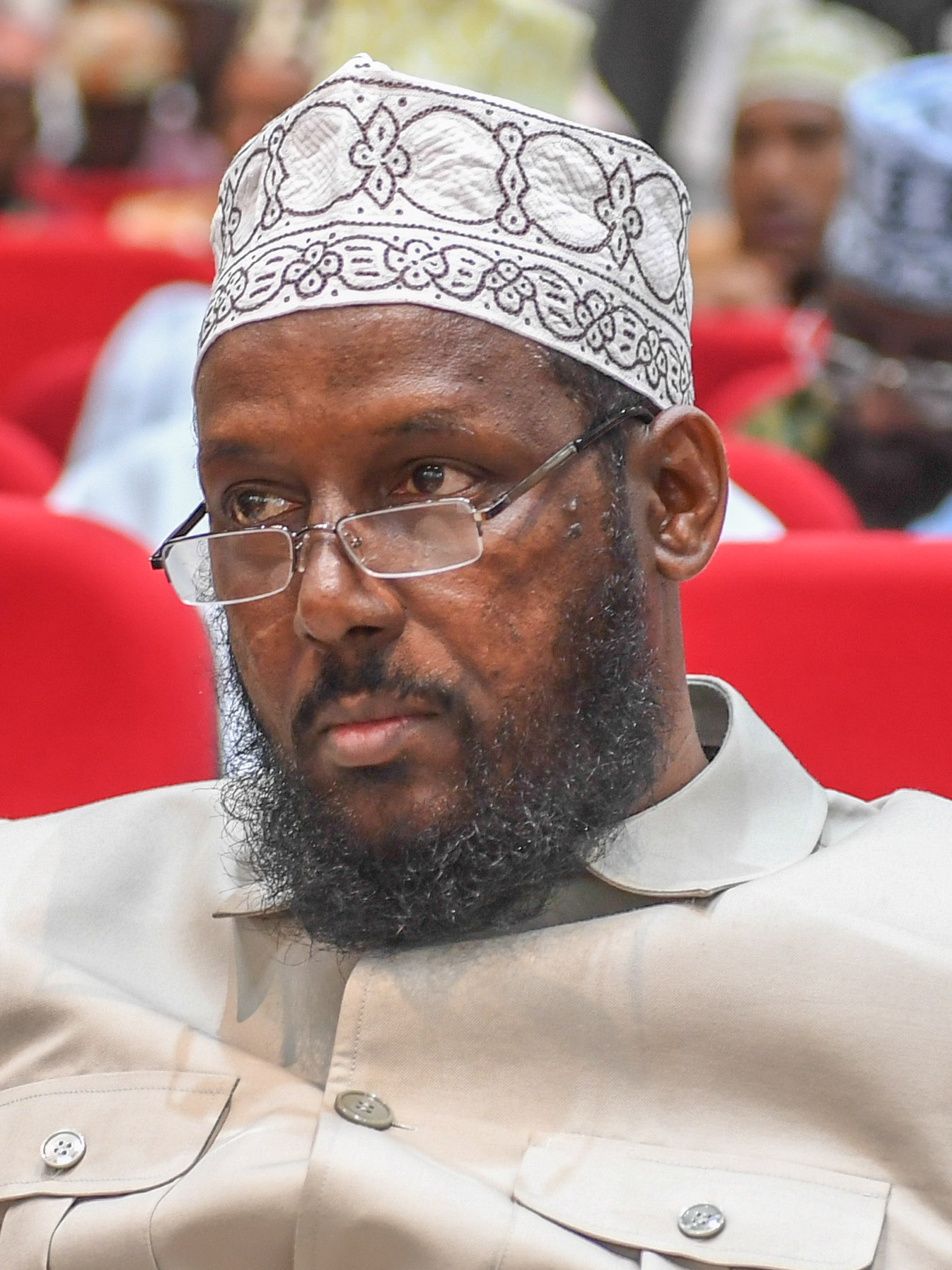
- Robow in 2023

Religious Affairs Minister of the Federal Government of Somalia
- Incumbent
- Assumed office 2 August 2022
- President: Hasan Sheikh Mohamud
- Prime Minister: Hamza Abdi Barre

Personal details
- Born: 10 October 1969 (age 56) Huddur, Bakool, Somalia
- Clan: Rahanweyn
- Nickname: Abu Mansur

Military service
- Years of service: Al-Itihaad Al-Islamiya (1991–1996); Islamic Courts Union (2004–2006); Al-Shabaab (2006–2017)
- Battles/wars: Ethiopian invasion and occupation (2006–2009); 2009 Hotel Shamo bombing; Somali Civil War (2009–present)

Sheikh Mukhtar Robow (Somali: Mukhtaar Roobow, Arabic: مختار روبو born 10 October 1969), also known as Abu Mansur, is a former deputy leader and former spokesman of the Somali militant group Al-Shabaab.

He was a member of Al-Itihaad al-Islamiya in the 1990s and later the Islamic Courts Union during the 2000s. During the insurgency against the Ethiopian military occupation that began in 2007 he became the spokesperson for Al-Shabaab.

In 2015, he defected from Al-Shabaab to the Somali government due to ideological differences with the group. During 2022, Robow was appointed as the Minister of Religious Affairs in the Federal Government of Somalia.

== Early life ==
Robow was born on 10 October 1969 in Huddur, in the Bakool region of southern Somalia. He studied at a local Qur'anic school, and later continued his religious education in the mosques of Mogadishu as well as those of his home region. A member of the Rahaweyn and more specifically of the Leysan clan which is particularly well represented in the South West State of Somalia. Robow also studied Islamic law in the 1990s at the University of Khartoum in Sudan. He worked for the al-Haramain Foundation in the early 1990s before joining Al-Itihaad al-Islamiya and fought with them until their disintegration following an Ethiopian intervention in 1996. He then taught at an Islamic School in the city of Afgooye until 2000, when he travelled to Afghanistan to train with al-Qaeda. Robow was living and training at the al-Farouq camp during the September 11 attacks and left Afghanistan shortly after the beginning of Operation Enduring Freedom

== Al-Shabaab ==
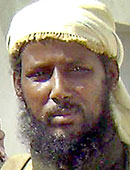
Photo of Robow during his time as an Al-Shabaab leader

Robow and other leading Al-Shabaab members challenged the leadership of Ahmed Abdi Godane (Mukhtar Abu Zubeyr) at Barawe in June 2013. Godane killed two of the leading members, and Robow fled to his home district. Godane's forces launched an offensive against Robow's supporters, it was reported in August 2013.

On 23 June 2017, United States Treasury Department's Office of Foreign Assets Control (OFAC) removed him from its Reward for Justice (RFJ) list following discussions with the Somali government after a US$5 million bounty had been placed for information leading to his capture on 7 June 2012.

== Defection ==
On 13 August 2017, he surrendered to the Somali Government authorities. In a press conference held in Mogadishu shortly after, he denounced Al-Shabaab and called on its members to quit the group.

== Candidacy for Regional Presidency ==
A year following his defection, Robow officially declared he was running for regional elections originally set for 17 November and later postponed to 19 December. He made the announcement to hundreds of his supporters in a welcoming rally in the South Western town of Baidoa.

In a sharp rebuke, Somalia's internal security ministry released a statement saying that Mukhtar Robow was not eligible to run for the regional elections. It was unclear whether the federal authorities have the ability to enforce a ban on a regional presidential candidate. Al Shabaab too has denounced the political ambitions of the group's highest profile defector, referring to him as a “Murtad”, or an apostate.

Worried about Robow's popularity, the federal government has sent at least one high-level official to try to persuade him to step aside. The electoral commission, dismissing the government’s demands, had awarded a certificate of eligibility to Mukhtar Robow.

Mukhtar Robow was officially cleared by the South West State Electoral Commission to contest in the December elections despite early protest by the Federal government seeking to have him barred. The Coalition for Change, which has thrown its weight behind Mukhtar Robow, issued a statement after the polls were postponed. The group said it fears the government was planning to rig the election since the new date is not favourable for international observers as most of them will then have left Somalia for the end of the year festivities.

Some 150 elite Somali forces, armed with DShK rifles, were deployed to Baidoa to physically block Robow from accessing the election venue.

On 7 Nov 2018 The United Nations Mission in Somalia (UNSOM) warned that the presidential election in Somalia's South West State had the potential to lead to violence and called on all parties to ensure that the electoral process proceeds in accordance with the established rules and avoids any behaviour which may lead to conflict or undermine the integrity of the electoral process.

=== Arrest ===
On 13 December 2018, Mukhtar Robow was arrested by African Union peacekeepers from Ethiopia and flown to Mogadishu under tight security. At least 12 people were killed in Baidoa in violence that erupted following Robow's arrest. Among those killed was a member of the regional parliament. The victims were shot by AMISOM Ethiopian forces and Somali Special Forces flown from Mogadishu.

Somali lawmakers have written a protest letter to the AU Commission in Addis Ababa, the Ethiopian government and the UN complaining about the conduct of AMISOM.

Robow's arrest also prompted the resignation of Somalia's Public Works Minister Abdifatah Mohamed Gesey, who hails from Baidoa and is from the same Leysan sub-clan as Robow, in protest.

The Special Representative of the UN Secretary-General for Somalia, Nicholas Haysom wrote to the Somali government on 30 December 2018, requesting details of the legal basis for the arrest of Robow, as well as calling for investigations into the deaths of protesters following his detention. Somalia's security forces used lethal force to put down three days of demonstrations in the south-western town of Baidoa on 13–15 December, killing at least 15 people and arresting 300, according to the UN. On 1 January 2019, three people were wounded including two UN staff members when a barrage of mortars were fired into the main UN base in Mogadishu.

Somalia's government has ordered the UN top envoy to leave the country, accusing him of "deliberately interfering with the country's sovereignty." The order comes days after the official, Nicholas Haysom, raised concerns about the action of Somalia's UN-backed security services in the recent violent episodes that left several people dead. The U.N. Security Council is expressing regret at Somalia's decision to expel a U.N. envoy who questioned the arrest of an extremist group defector-turned-political candidate.

In December 2021, Somalia's Interior Minister Abdullahi Nor, asked the country's National Intelligence Security Agency to hand over a report on the arrest and subsequent detention of Robow,

== Ministry of Religious Affairs ==
In Aug 2022, Robow was appointed to become Minister Of Religious Affairs in the cabinet of President Hassan Sheikh Mohamud.
