= Ministry of Industry and Trade (Somalia) =

Coordinates: 2°2′24″N 45°20′46″E

Federal Republic of Somalia Ministry of Commerce and Industry
- Wasaaradda Ganacsiga iyo Warshadaha
- Coat of arms of Somalia

Agency overview
- Jurisdiction: Somalia
- Headquarters: Bondhere, Banaadir, Mogadishu (Somalia)
- Minister responsible: Gamal Mohamed Hassan
- Agency executive: Minister
- Website: https://moci.gov.so/

The Ministry of Commerce and Industry of Somalia is the ministry that is responsible for industry and trade in the country. The current Minister of Commerce and Industry is Gamal Mohamed Hassan

== List of ministers ==
- –2015: Abdirahman Abdi Osman
- 2015–: Abdirashid Mohamed Ahmed
- 2017–2018: Khadra Ahmed Dualeh
- 2018–: Mohamed Abdi Hayir
- since 2022: Jibril Abdirashid Nur
