= Ministry of Petroleum and Mineral Resources (Somalia) =

Government ministry of Somalia

Coordinates: 2°2′24″N 45°20′46″E

Federal Republic of Somalia Natural Resources
- Coat of arms of Somalia

Agency overview
- Jurisdiction: Somalia
- Headquarters: Bondhere, Banaadir, Mogadishu (Somalia)
- Agency executive: Abdirisak Omar Mohamed, Minister

Ministry of Natural Resources was the ministry that was responsible for the natural resources of Somalia. On 17 January 2014, newly appointed Prime Minister of Somalia, Abdiweli Sheikh Ahmed split the ministerial portfolio into the Ministries of Agriculture, Mineral Resources, Fishing and Marine Resources, Environment and Livestock, and Energy and Water, respectively.
