= Ministry of Agriculture (Somalia) =

Government ministry of Somalia

Ministry of Agriculture and Irrigation
- Wasaaradda Beeraha iyo Waraabka
- Emblem of the Ministry of Agriculture and Irrigation

Agency overview
- Formed: September 1960
- Jurisdiction: Somalia
- Headquarters: Mogadishu
- Minister responsible: Mohamed Abdi Hayir
- Agency executive: Minister
- Parent agency: Cabinet of Somalia
- Website: moa.gov.so

The Ministry of Agriculture and Irrigation of Somalia (MOAIOS) (Somali: Wasaaradda Beeraha iyo Waraabka ee Soomaaliya) is a ministry responsible for Agriculture in Somalia. The three broad areas of scope for the Ministry are agriculture, food processing and co-operation. The current Minister of Agriculture is Mohamed Abdi Hayir.

== Background ==
During the Siad Barre era this ministry was referred to as the Department of Natural Resources. The longest serving minister of this department was Abdirahman Shagahle.

Agriculture is the principal source of livelihood for more than half population of Somalia. Agriculture provides the bulk of wage goods required by non-agriculture sectors and most of the raw materials for the industries sector. Somalia is a largely agrarian economy, It accounts for about 65% of the GDP and employs 65% of the workforce. Livestock alone contributes about 40% to GDP and more than 50% of export earnings.

In December 2014, the Ministry of Agriculture announced that it would commence a new water management project on the Shabelle River in 2015 in order to assist small scale cultivators. The initiative will in part see additional water channels dug so as to more effectively control river flows on farms.

== Ministers ==
- Salad Abdi Mohamed, 1959–1960
- Ahmed Haji Dualeh, 1960–1962
- Ali Garad Jama, 1961–1964
- Ismail Duale Warsame, 1964–1966
- Mohamud Abdi Nur “Jujo”, 1966–1967
- Ali Alio Mohamed, 1967–1969
- Abdullahi Mohamed Hirad, May–Oct 1969
- Abdalla Aw Farah Hersi, 1969–1970
- Mohamed Hassan “Dottorino”, 1970–1973
- Omar Salah Abdi Karim, 1973–1974
- Mohamed Ibrahim “Liqliqato”, 1974–1978
- Ahmed Hassan Muse, 1978–1982
- Bile Rafle Gulaid, 1982–1987
- Abdirizak Mohamud Abubakar, 1987–1989
- Bile Rafle Gulaid, 1989–1990
- Mohamud Mohamed Ulusow, Feb–Sept 1990
- Abdisalam Sheikh Hussein, 1990–1991

== See also ==
- Agriculture in Somalia
