= Mohamud Ali Saleh =

Former Kenyan ambassador

Ambassador Mohamud Ali Saleh

Secretary/Head of Reforms, Ministry of Interior and Coordination of National Government.
- Incumbent
- Assumed office September 2018
- President: Uhuru Kenyatta

Regional Commissioner, North Eastern, Ministry of Interior and Coordination of National Government.
- In office May 2015 – August 2018
- President: Uhuru Kenyatta

Ambassador of Kenya to The Kingdom of Saudi Arabia, Ministry of Foreign Affairs
- In office December 2010 – January 2015
- President: Mwai Kibaki

Commissioner, Presidential Commission on Police Reforms
- In office April 2009 – December 2009

Secretary/Administration, Ministry of Labour, Ministry of Education, Ministry of Science and Technology
- In office February 2003 – December 2007

Provincial Commissioner
- In office January 2001 – January 2003

Personal details
- Born: Wajir County
- Education: Manchester University, Glasgow Caledonian University

Mohamud Ali Saleh is a former Kenyan Ambassador to Kingdom of Saudi Arabia, appointed the Regional Commissioner for North Eastern Region (Kenya) in May 2015 after the Garissa University attack which killed 148 students.

== Life and career ==
He is a long serving administrator. He was awarded by the President of Republic of Kenya H.E. Uhuru Kenyatta the award of The First Class: Chief of the Order of the Burning Spear (CBS) for relentless service he rendered to NEP and the Republic of Kenya in different capacities.
