= Trans-National Industrial Electricity and Gas Company =

Company of Somalia

The Trans-National Industrial Electricity and Gas Company is an energy conglomerate based in Mogadishu, Somalia. Established in 2010, it unites five major Somali companies from the trade, finance, security and telecommunications sectors, after an agreement was signed in Istanbul, Turkey that will see this new firm provide electricity and gas in Somalia. With an investment budget of $1 billion, the company's aim is to create 100,000 jobs and build the necessary infrastructure to accommodate its energy projects in the country.
