= Mohamud Moalin Yahya =

State Minister of Interior and Federalism of Somalia
- Incumbent
- Assumed office 17 January 2014
- Prime Minister: Abdiweli Sheikh Ahmed

Mohamud Moalin Yahya is a Somali politician. He is the State Minister of Interior and Federalism of Somalia, having been appointed to the position on 17 January 2014 by Prime Minister Abdiweli Sheikh Ahmed.
