= Abdirisak Omar Mohamed =

Somali politician and policymaker

Abdirizak Omar Mohamed عبد الرزاق عمر محمد
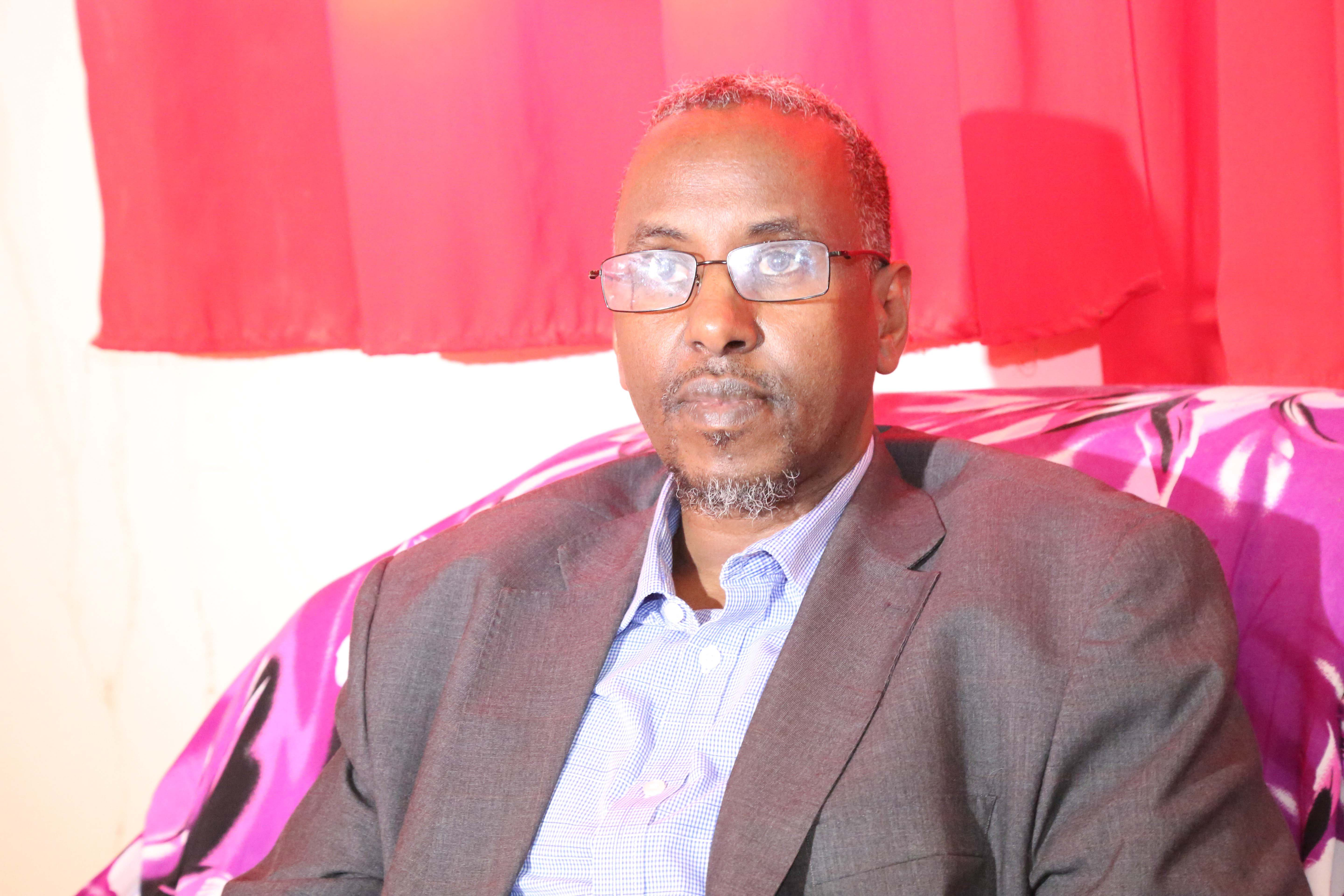
- Dr. Abdirizak Omar Mohamed in 2016

Ministry of Petroleum and Mineral Resources (Somalia)
- In office 22 August 2022 – 22 December 2024
- President: Hassan Sheikh Mohamud
- Prime Minister: Hamza Abdi Barre

Minister of Internal Security
- In office 6 February 2015 – 29 March 2017
- President: Hassan Sheikh Mohamud
- Prime Minister: Omar Abdirashid Ali Sharmarke

Minister of Petroleum, Water and Natural Resources of Somalia
- In office 27 January 2015 – 6 February 2015
- Prime Minister: Omar Abdirashid Ali Sharmarke

Minister of Natural Resources of Somalia
- In office 4 November 2012 – 17 January 2014
- Prime Minister: Abdi Farah Shirdon

Personal details
- Born: Buloburde, Hiiraan
- Profession: Politician, Academic.

Dr. Abdirizak Omar Mohamed (Somali: Cabdirisaaq Cumar Maxamed, Arabic: عبد الرزاق عمر محمد) is a Somali politician, academic, and policymaker. He has held senior roles in the Federal Government of Somalia, including Minister of Petroleum and Mineral Resources (2022–2024), Minister of Internal Security (2015–2017), and Minister of Natural Resources (2012–2014). He is currently a Member of Parliament in the House of the People of the Federal Parliament of Somalia.

== Minister of Petroleum and Mineral Resources (2022-2024) ==
Abdirizak Omar Mohamed assumed the role of Minister of Petroleum and Mineral Resources in August 2022 under President Hassan Sheikh Mohamud and Prime Minister Hamza Abdi Barre. He entered office during a period when Somalia was pursuing efforts to stabilize its political institutions and develop its energy sector.

During his tenure, he worked on policies intended to support the development of Somalia’s petroleum industry, which had experienced years of institutional limitations and underinvestment.

In October 2022, Mohamed finalized a production sharing agreement focusing on offshore oil and gas exploration between the Federal Government of Somalia and the U.S.-based company Coastline Exploration. The deal covered seven offshore blocks, with the company paying a US$7 million signature bonus to the Somali government. Mohamed described the agreement as a formalization of an earlier deal.

Mohamed oversaw administrative and exploratory initiatives within the ministry, including the signing of an intergovernmental oil and gas cooperation agreement with Turkey in March 2024, which outlined plans to explore both onshore and offshore hydrocarbon blocks. The agreement formed part of broader efforts to expand international partnerships in the country’s energy sector.

On 22 December 2024, Mohamed was removed from his post in a cabinet reshuffle and succeeded by Dahir Shire Mohamed.
