= Somalis in Germany =

Somalians residing in Germany

- Distribution of Somali citizens in Germany (2021)

Total population
- 33,900

Regions with significant populations
- Berlin · Kassel · Frankfurt

Languages
- Somali, German

Religion
- Islam

Somalis in Germany are citizens and residents of Germany who are of Somali descent. According to the Federal Statistical Office of Germany, as of 2020, there are a total 47,495 Somalia-born immigrants living in Germany.

== History ==
Between 1969 and 1991, the flow of Somali refugees to Germany was steady, but it increased quickly after 1991. Many of these later arrivals subsequently moved on to other countries, including the United Kingdom. UNHCR data suggests that 15,000 people from Somalia claimed asylum in Germany between 1990 and 1999. In March 2019, together with the International Organization for Migration, Germany started to run a resettlement programme for refugees in Ethiopia. A first group of 154 Somali refugees were resettled in Germany under the programme in October 2019. According to German Census data, Kassel has the highest share of Somali migrant and has a Somali cultural association. Other cities like Berlin and Frankfurt have also few numbers of Somali population.

In December 2025 a group of 143 people from Somalia, Congo, Ethiopia and Sudan was admitted into Germany after two Somali families had used lawsuits, supported by Pro Asyl NGO activists, to force their way into the country. The Berlin-Brandenburg Regional High Court decided in October 2025 that the government had to bring the Somalis to Germany to fulfill third-country resettlement obligations, taken by the previous administration.

== Social issues ==
In a BKA report on statistics from 2017, migrants to Germany from Somalia constituted 1.7% of all migrants and 2.9% of all migrant crime suspects.

=== Female genital mutilation and gender-based violence ===
According to the BMFSFJ, of the 5,797 women from Somalia living in Germany in May 2016 without German citizenship, 5,681 (98%) were victims of female genital mutilation.

According to research with 20 Somali refugee women living in shared reception facilities in Germany, many travelled to the country alone, with fear of sexual violence, forced marriage, honor killings or FGM being cited as gender-specific reasons for having fled Somalia.

== See also ==
- Germany–Somalia relations
