= Mohamed Moktar Ibrahim =

Somali politician

Minister of Fisheries and Marine Resources of Somalia
- Incumbent
- Assumed office 27 January 2015
- Prime Minister: Omar Abdirashid Ali Sharmarke

Personal details
- Born: Somalia
- Party: Independent

Mohamed Moktar Ibrahim is a Somali politician. He belongs to the Gal Je’el subclan of the Hawiye. He is the Minister of Fisheries and Marine Resources of Somalia, having been appointed to the position on 27 January 2015 by Prime Minister Omar Abdirashid Ali Sharmarke.
