= Immigration to Somalia =

Immigration in Somalia is regulated by the Somali Immigration Department of the Federal Government of Somalia.

== Regulation ==
Due to the long absence of governmental regulation, it is uncertain how many foreigners travel to Somalia per year. However, visas and residence permits are now mandatory for all foreign nationals. As of April 2014, the re-established Somali Immigration Department requires all undocumented foreigners to register at its offices in the capital Mogadishu.

As part of IOM Somalia's Capacity Building for Migration Management (CBMM) projects, a Migration Information and Data Analysis System (MIDAS) was installed in 2014. The new immigration and border management infrastructure strengthens security by screening travelers at 11 main ports of entry in the country. It in the process registers their biometric data and passport details, and generates statistics for policymakers.

In April 2015, the Federal Cabinet also passed a new policy prioritizing the local workforce and restricting the reliance on foreign labour.

== Demographics ==
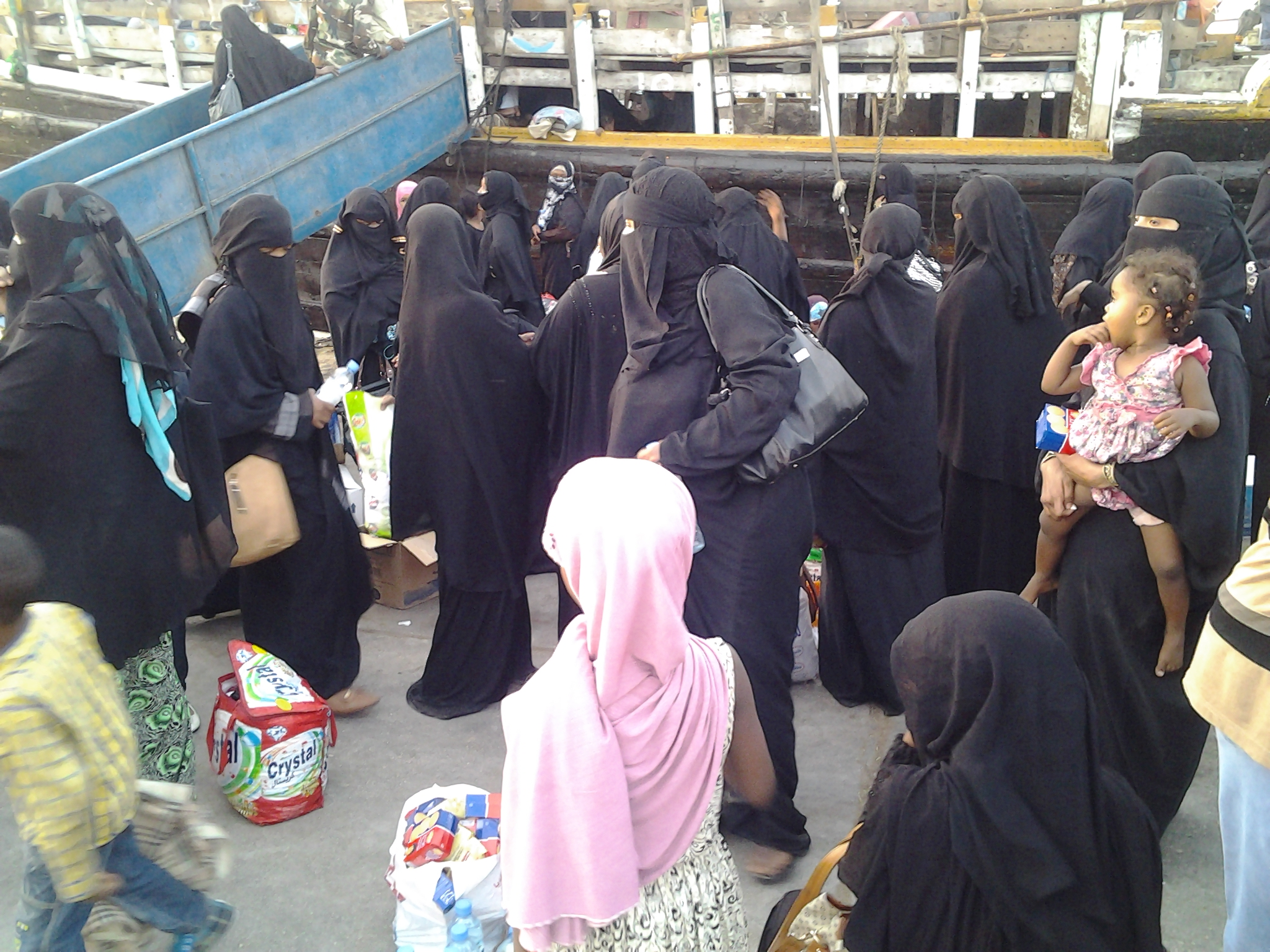
Somali expatriates returning from Yemen in Bosaso (2015).

As of 2012, most emigrants to Somalia consist of Somali expatriates, who have returned to Mogadishu and other urban areas for investment opportunities and to take part in the ongoing post-conflict reconstruction process. Through both private efforts and public initiatives like the Somali Diaspora Corps, they have participated in the renovation of schools, hospitals, banks and other infrastructure, and have played a leading role in the capital's recovery. They have also helped to propel the local real estate market.

In 2015, after the Saudi-led military intervention in Yemen, many returning Somali expatriates as well as various foreign nationals began emigrating from Yemen to northern Somalia. The UN expects the number of foreign nationals to eventually reach 100,000 over the following months.

As of September 2014, the Ministry of Planning and International Cooperation is scheduled to launch the first population census for Somalia in over two decades. The UNFPA assisted the Ministry in the project, which is slated to be finalized ahead of the planned plebiscite and local and national elections in 2016.

== Tourism ==
Tourism in Somalia is overseen by the Federal Government of Somalia's Ministry of Tourism. The autonomous Puntland and Somaliland regions maintain their own tourist offices. The industry was traditionally noted for its numerous historical sites, beaches, waterfalls, mountain ranges and national parks. After the start of the civil war in the early 1990s, the Tourism Ministry shut down operations. It was later re-established in the 2000s, and once again oversees the national tourist industry. The Mogadishu-based Somali Tourism Association (SOMTA) also provides on-the-ground consulting services.

== Citizenship ==
In December 2013, the Federal Government officially launched Somalia's new e-passport. Part of a broader initiative to strengthen security, the passport will be issued by the Ministry of Interior's Department of Immigration. Next, citizens are eligible for the e-passport upon production of government-issued national identity documents and birth certificates.

According to Article 54 of the national constitution, the allocation of powers and resources between the Federal Government and the Federal Republic of Somalia's constituent Federal Member States shall be negotiated and agreed upon by the Federal Government and the Federal Member States, except in matters pertaining to citizenship and immigration, foreign affairs, national defense, and monetary policy.

== Sources of immigration ==
Most of the migrants to Somalia are from Ethiopia, Yemen and African Union forces within the framework of the African Union Peacekeeping Mission

Total immigrant population by country of origin, 2019
Immigrant
Rank	Country of origin	Population	Portion of immigrants in Somalia	Portion of Somalian population	Notes
0	Somalia	15,387,869	N/A	99.66%	
N/A	India	N/A	N/A	N/A	
19	China	≥ 1	0%	0%	
N/A	Philippines	N/A	N/A	N/A	
18	United Kingdom	≥ 2	0%	0%	
9	United States	≈ 700	1.34%	0%	
7	Italy	≤ 1,000	1.92%	0.01%	
N/A	Pakistan	N/A	N/A	N/A	
19	Iran	≥ 1	0%	0%	
N/A	France	N/A	N/A	N/A	
N/A	Lebanon	N/A	N/A	N/A	
N/A	Russia	N/A	N/A	N/A	
N/A	Morocco	N/A	N/A	N/A	
19	Iraq	≥ 1	0%	0%	
N/A	Algeria	N/A	N/A	N/A	
15	Egypt	≥ 94	0.18%	0%	
N/A	Taiwan	N/A	N/A	N/A	
N/A	Bangladesh	N/A	N/A	N/A	
10	Syria	262 to 1312	0.5%	0%	Refugees of the Syrian civil war
N/A	Afghanistan	N/A	N/A	N/A	
N/A	South Africa	N/A	N/A	N/A	
12	Nigeria	≥ 200	0.38%	0%	
1	Ethiopia	19,348	37.11%	0.13%	title=Somalia Somalia - International immigration]
5	Kenya	≥ 3,594	6.89%	0.02%	
11	Turkey	≥ 202	0.39%	0%	
N/A	Congo, Democratic Republic of the	N/A	N/A	N/A	
16	Ghana	≥ 56	0.11%	0%	
19	United Arab Emirates	≥ 1	0%	0%	
12	Tanzania	≥ 200	0.38%	0%	
N/A	Saudi Arabia	N/A	N/A	N/A	
19	Cameroon	≥ 1	0%	0%	
N/A	Tunisia	N/A	N/A	N/A	
17	Eritrea	40	0.08%	0%	
N/A	Indonesia	N/A	N/A	N/A	
N/A	Jordan	N/A	N/A	N/A	
6	Uganda	≥ 3,523	6.76%	0.02%	
19	Denmark	≥ 1	0%	0%	
19	Sudan	≥ 1	0%	0%	
N/A	Zimbabwe	N/A	N/A	N/A	
4	Burundi	≥ 5,338	10.24%	0.03%	
N/A	Palestine, West Bank and Gaza Strip	N/A	N/A	N/A	
19	Senegal	≥ 1	0%	0%	
19	Libya	≥ 1	0%	0%	
N/A	South Sudan	N/A	N/A	N/A	
N/A	Guinea	N/A	N/A	N/A	
19	Zambia	≥ 1	0%	0%	
19	Zimbabwe	≥ 1	0%	0%	
N/A	Madagascar	N/A	N/A	N/A	
14	Sierra Leone	≥ 159	0.31%	0%	
3	Yemen	7,051	13.53%	0.05%	
19	Qatar	≥ 1	0%	0%	
8	Djibouti	952	1.83%	0.01%	
19	Mali	≥ 1	0%	0%	
N/A	Chad	N/A	N/A	N/A	
N/A	Central African Republic	N/A	N/A	N/A	
2	Other or Unknown	9,383	18.38%	0.06%	By subtracting the confirmed number from the total number of immigrants
N/A	Niger	N/A	N/A	N/A	
N/A	Malawi	N/A	N/A	N/A	
19	Gambia	≥ 1	0%	0%	
N/A	Comoros	N/A	N/A	N/A	
19	Angola	≥ 1	0%	0%	
N/A	Total immigrants	52,131	100%	0.34%	

== See also ==
- Demographics of Somalia
- Foreign relations of Somalia
- Somali passport
- Visa policy of Somalia
- List of citizenships refused entry to foreign states
