= Agriculture in Somalia =

Agriculture of Somalia (Somali: Beeraha Soomaaliya) is the largest economic sector in Somalia and the country's major source of employment. It contributes more than 65% to the national GDP from domestic distribution and exports to other parts of the continent, Asia and Europe.

== History ==
=== Civilian Era 1960-1969 ===
A U.S. Peace Corps volunteer who worked closely with the pre-1969 government's Ministry of Agriculture wrote in his memoir that the Somali ministry of agriculture was effectively a “non-virtual entity,” describing it as taking no meaningful interest in the advancement of Somali agriculture despite the presence of capable individuals who could have driven progress but showed little inclination to do so.

"From my personal vantage point as a volunteer in the bush, the Ministry has proved to be a virtual nonentity—and a very poorly organized and inefficient non-entity at that. During my four months in Gorisane, for example, the local agriculture agent deigned to show up a total of three days, during which time his activity was limited to drinking tea in his pal's mundul."

=== Barre era 1969-1991 ===
In the early 1970s, the CIA issued a special assessment of Somalia's economy, describing the task facing the new government as a “Herculean task” given the country's arid terrain, limited resources, and largely undeveloped economy, in which most of its 2.8 million people relied on nomadic herding and subsistence agriculture for their livelihood. The report attributed this difficult starting position in part to the civilian era's development programs, which it characterised as inefficiently administered, having accomplished little beyond giving Somalia a reputation for squandering foreign aid.

Addressing the country's resource constraints, the Barre government adopted seawater desalination technology developed in 1964 by Ukrainian-Israeli chemist Alexander Zarchin. This method, which removed salt particles from seawater, was adapted by Barre's government in the early 1970s, leading to the construction of a desalination plant that expanded access to clean water and irrigation. Barre identified reducing the disparity between northern and southern Somalia as a central goal of his agricultural policy, alongside broader programs to combat overgrazing and boost food production. In 1973, government ministers were dispatched to Gabiley in north-western Somalia to instruct local communities on the importance and methods of improved food production.

These efforts contributed to substantial gains over the following decade: sorghum production rose 87 percent, from an average of 139,000 tons in the 1970s to 260,000 tons by 1985, while maize production increased 162 percent over the same period, from 107,000 tons to 280,000 tons, leaving Somalia largely self-sufficient in both crops. A UNICEF report from the period found that levels of absolute poverty and malnutrition in Somalia appeared markedly lower than in most other low-income sub-Saharan African economies, and noted no evidence of secular deterioration in these conditions over time.

Under Barre, Somalia achieved caloric self-sufficiency. The country reached a per capita calorie availability of more than 2,800 calories per day, with 69 percent of total calories supplied by domestically produced food. Agricultural productivity was notably high by African standards. Somali farmers could produce enough food to meet their own needs while generating a surplus to support one additional non-farming person. Although farmers made up only about one-third of the population, they produced enough surplus to sustain a substantial non-agricultural population.

Experts highlighted this as exceptional in Africa. In contrast, many other African countries at the time had agricultural sectors in which farmers constituted three-quarters or more of the population, yet their output frequently failed to adequately feed the remaining non-farming quarter of society.

"In 1984, two Somali farmers managed to produce enough of a surplus to feed one non-farmer. While this may not seem enormous, the same cannot be said for many other African countries. The relevant point here is that in Somalia farmers comprise only around one-third of the total population whereas in most other African countries they form three-quarters or more. Those three-quarters have gradually lost their capacity to feed the remaining one-quarter non-farmers. In Somalia a much smaller farm population not only feeds itself but produces a surplus large enough to feed a sizeable part of the non-farm population. Thus if Somalia is food-deficient on the whole, and has to import food, it is not because the farmers fail to produce enough for themselves, but because the nomads who comprise the majority of the population fail to do so."

The government's largest infrastructure undertaking in this period was the Fanole Dam, built with Chinese technical assistance. Construction began in 1977 and was completed in 1982; the project created thousands of jobs for Somalis and supplied electricity to southern Somalia.

== Pastoralism ==
Somalia's economy consists of both traditional and modern production, with a gradual shift in favor of modern industrial techniques taking root. Agriculture is the most important economic sector. It accounts for about 65% of the GDP and employs 65% of the workforce. Livestock alone contributes about 40% to GDP and more than 50% of export earnings.

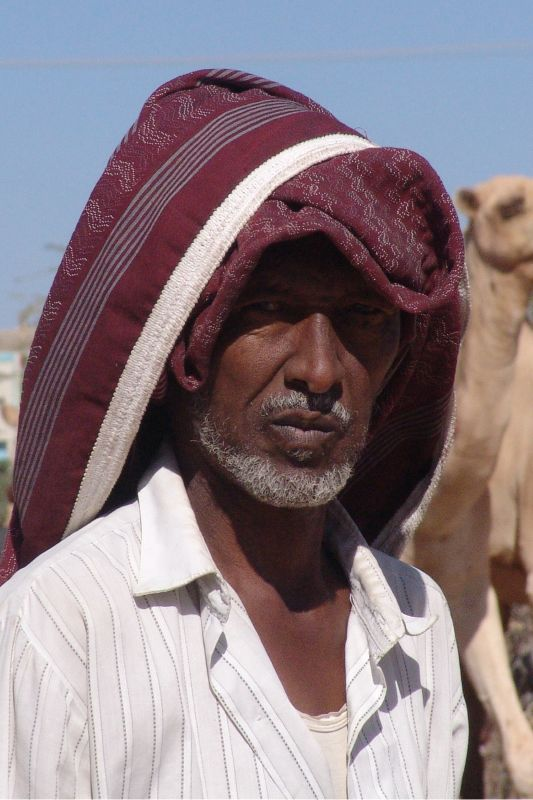
A camel trader in Hargeisa, Somalia

According to the Central Bank of Somalia, about 80% of the population are nomadic or semi-nomadic pastoralists, who keep camels, goats, sheep and cattle. The herders also gather resins and gums to supplement their income.

Camel, sheep and goat herding are the main types of local pastoralism, particularly in the northern part of the country. Livestock include the Somali goat and the Blackheaded Somali and Somali Arab breeds of sheep. The Somali goat is used primarily for the production of meat. Both males and females have horns, although females are often polled. The goats are drought tolerant and, when milked, can each yield one to three kilograms of milk daily, even when access to water is limited. The Somali sheep is the direct forebear of the Blackhead Persian, the latter of which was bred in South Africa between the late 19th century to early 20th century and has been extensively used for crossbreeding in many tropical areas. It belongs to the fat-tail type, and both of the breed's genders are polled. The animal is mainly reared for meat production, and is a major export of the Somali economy, particularly to the Arabian Peninsula.

With the advantage of being located near the Arabian Peninsula, Somali traders have increasingly begun to challenge Australia's traditional dominance over the Gulf Arab livestock and meat market, offering quality animals at very low prices. In response, Gulf Arab states have started to make strategic investments in the country, with Saudi Arabia building livestock export infrastructure and the United Arab Emirates purchasing large farmlands. Most livestock is exported through the northern port of Bosaso as well as Berbera in neighbouring Somaliland. In March 2013, livestock traders also resumed exports from the southern Port of Mogadishu. After inspection at a newly constructed animal quarantine facility in Mogadishu, 13,000 goats and 2,435 camels were sent to markets in Egypt, the UAE, Saudi Arabia and Bahrain. A ten-year-old manufacturing, distributing, wholesale and import/export company, the Bosaso Tannery processes wet salted, dry salted, wet blue, limed, pickled, and air/frame dried sheep and goat hides and skin. It has some of the highest quality natural skins on the continent. The firm exports a little over 90,000 tonnes of hides and skins every year from Bosaso to Ethiopia, Turkey, Pakistan, India, China and Italy. Raw camel hides and sheep and goat skin are also dispatched to the United Arab Emirates. The wet blue type is exported to the Middle East and various parts of Europe. As of 2012, the company is moving toward ready-made leather production for eventual exportation to consumer markets in the Middle East and other areas.

In 2007, the Burao city authority in collaboration with development organizations and local traders opened the Burco Meat and Produce complex. Burao along with the nearby town of Yirowe are home to the largest livestock markets, known in Somali as seylad, in the Horn of Africa, with as many as 10,000 heads of sheep and goats sold daily, many of whom shipped to Gulf states via the port of Berbera. The market handles livestock from all over the Horn of Africa. One year in the making, the market has two main halls and can accommodate more than 2,000 merchants. In conjunction with the Italian government, the Puntland authorities are also slated to open a new livestock market in Galkayo.

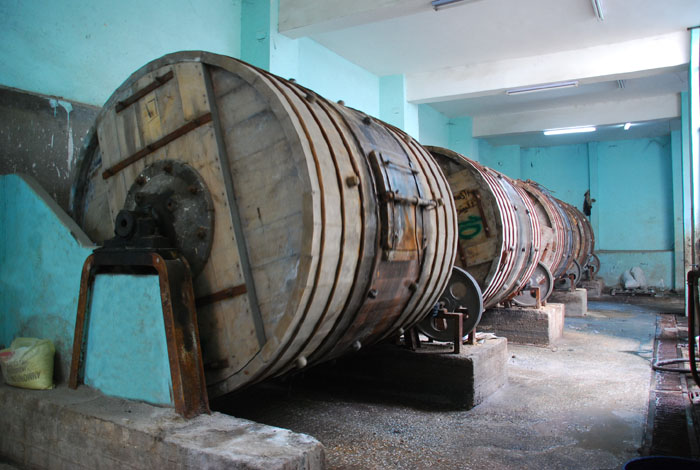
Machines at a Bosaso Tannery workshop.

In June 2014, the European Union (EU) and African Union InterAfrican Bureau for Animal Resources (AU-IBAR) jointly launched the new Reinforcing Animal Health Services in Somalia (RAHS) project in Mogadishu. A 4 million EUR (US$5.4 million) program, it aims to promote livestock production for over 250,000 local pastoralists, further strengthen the capacity, quality, access and sustainability of national animal health services delivery, and sustain exportation. RAHS is also expected to support private sector development initiatives in the livestock industry, and to enhance public-private partnerships.

According to the FAO, Somalia exported a record 5 million units of livestock to markets in the Gulf region in 2014. Valued at US$300 million, the exports included 4.6 million sheep and goats, 340,000 cattle and 77,000 camels. The enhanced trade was facilitated by greater sectoral investment by the Somali government in conjunction with the FAO, which centered on livestock infrastructure, livestock vaccination and treatment services, and fodder production. Additionally, modern slaughterhouses, meat and animal husbandry markets have buttressed the livestock commerce. In order to tap into value added livestock products, a program aimed at ameliorating the quality of milk production was also launched in the country's northwestern region, with assistance provided by the EU. In May 2015, 150 local workers are slated to receive further training by the FAO in leather curing.

== Farming ==
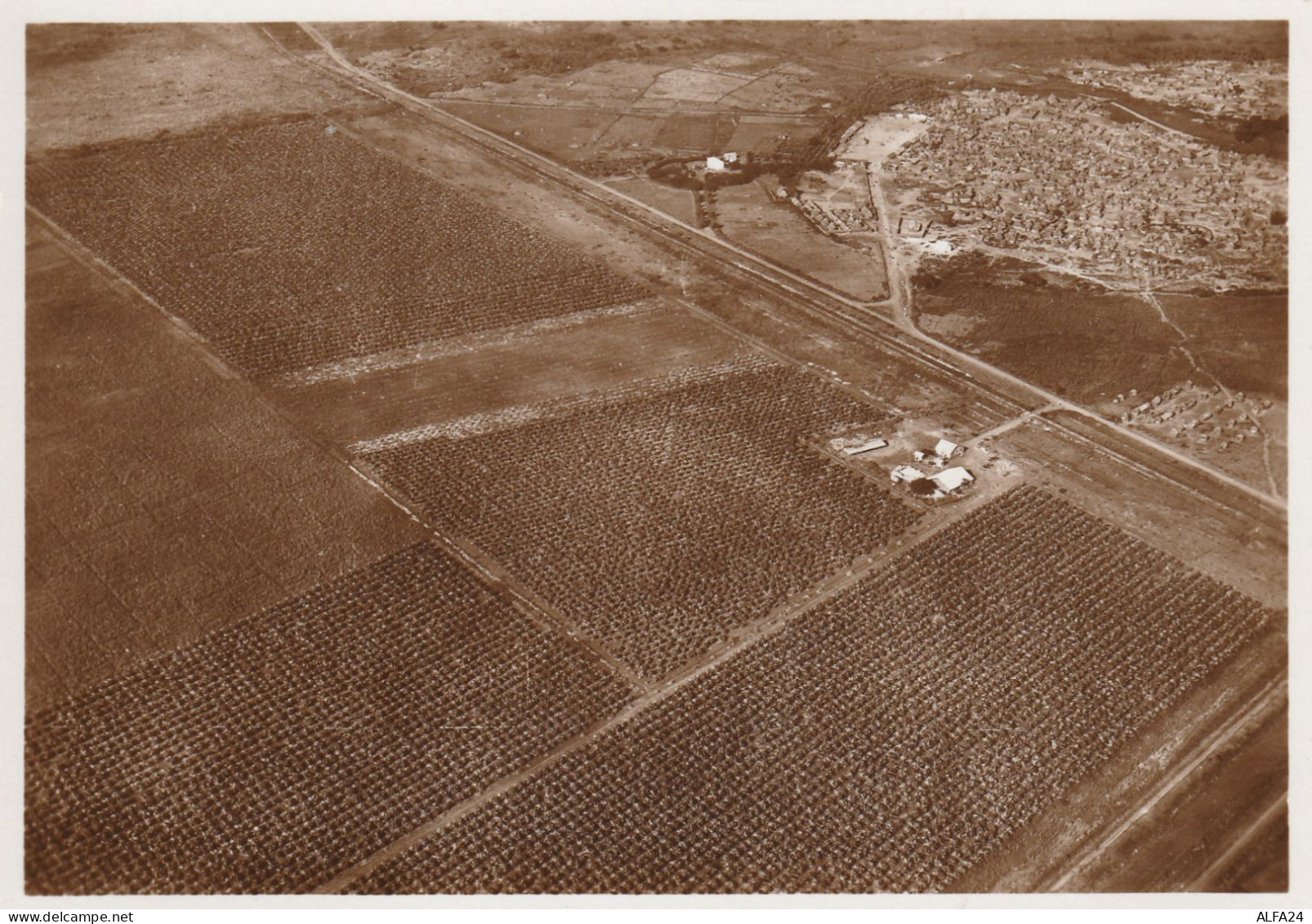
Aeral view of Vittorio di Africa in Italian Somalia, 1920s

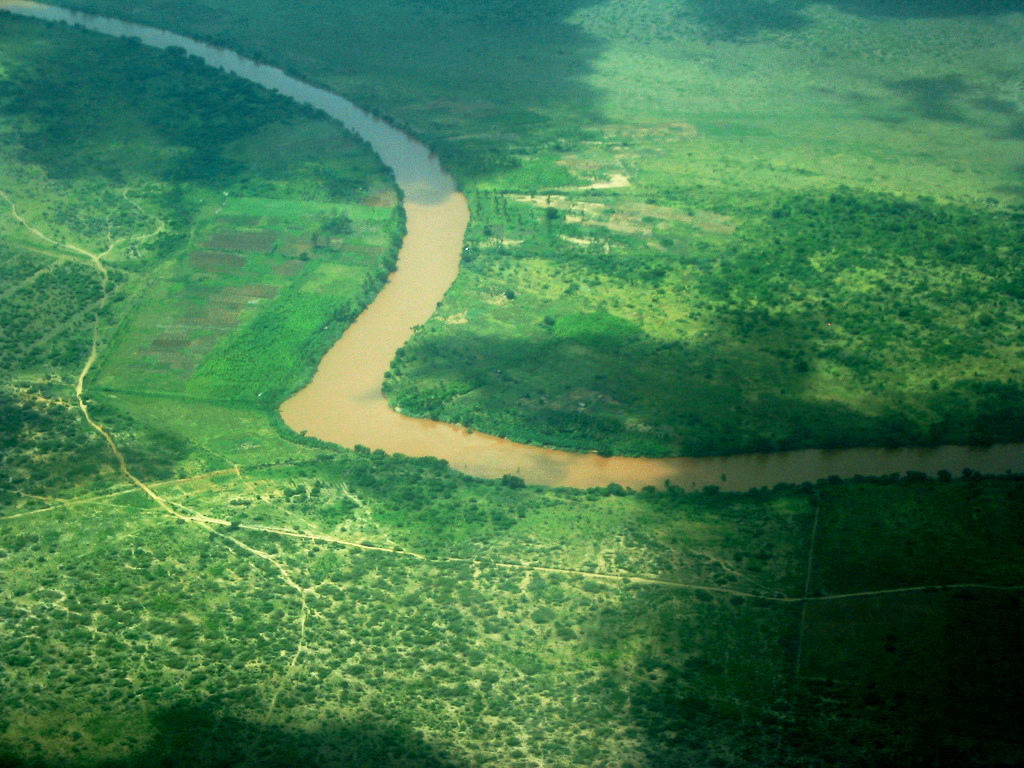
Farmland along the Juba River in the southern Lower Juba region, a local agricultural center.

Somalia produced, in 2018, 209 thousand tons of sugarcane, 138 thousand tons of maize, 129 thousand tons of sorghum, 92 thousand tons of cassava, 75 thousand tons of vegetable, in addition to smaller productions of other agricultural products, like beans, banana, sesame seed, tomato, coconut, orange and date.

Somalia's farming areas are concentrated in the southern part of the country, in the Gedo, Middle Juba, Lower Juba, Lower Shebelle, Middle Shebelle and Hiran regions. The Juba River and Shabelle River pass through these provinces, rendering the soil more conducive to crop cultivation than the comparatively arid north, where pastoralism has instead traditionally been practiced.

Principal crop exports include bananas; sugar, sorghum and corn are products for the domestic market. According to the Central Bank of Somalia, imports of goods total about $460 million per year, and have recovered and even surpassed aggregate imports prior to the start of the civil war in 1991. Exports, which total about $270 million annually, have also surpassed pre-war aggregate export levels but still lead to a trade account deficit of about $190 million US dollars per year. However, this trade deficit is far exceeded by remittances sent by Somalis in the diaspora, which have helped sustain the import level.

In mid-2010, Somalia's business community also pledged to invest $1 billion in the national economy industries over the following five years. Abdullahi Hussein, the director of the just-formed Trans-National Industrial Electricity and Gas Company, predicted that the investment strategy would create 100,000 jobs. The new firm was established through the merger of five Somali companies from the trade, finance, security and telecommunications sectors. The second phase of the project, which began in mid-to-late 2011, saw the construction of factories in specially designated economic zones for the farming, livestock, fishing and mining industries.

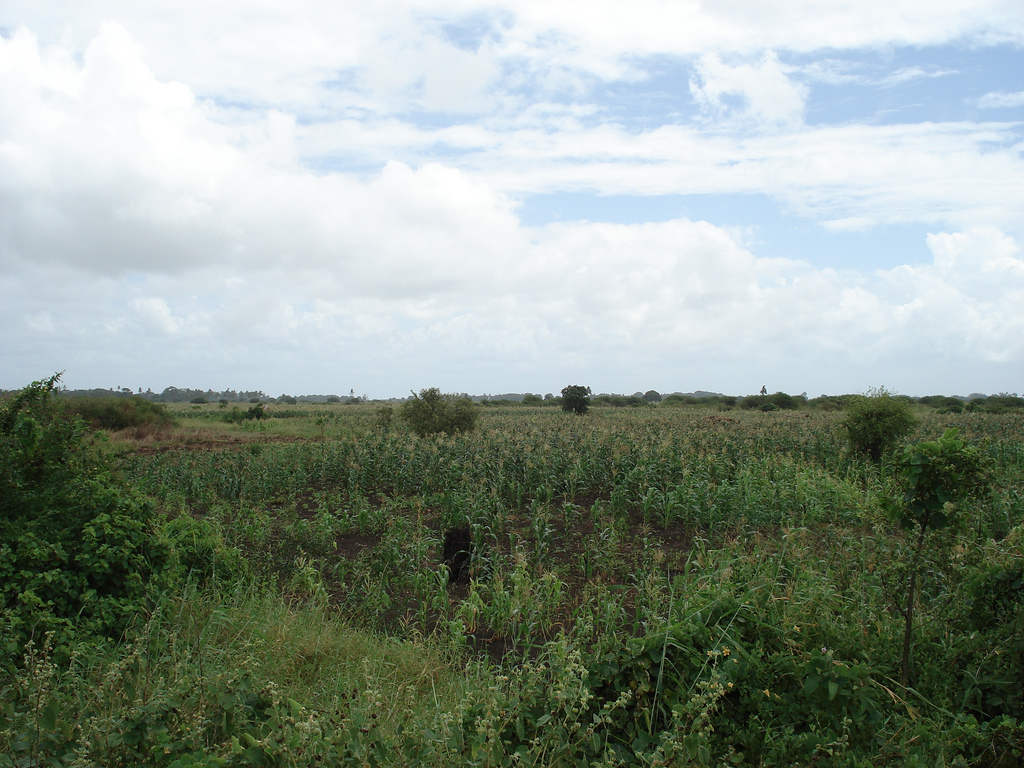
A maize field in the south

In 2014, local farmers completed a program enabling them to begin selling for the first time high quality grain to the UN's WFP. Under the initiative, the cultivators received training from FAO and WFP experts on grading their grain, post-harvest handling, and warehouse and storage management. The aim was to strengthen the farmers' knowledge base and production capacity to meet international supply standards. By March of the year, cultivators from south-central Somalia had through the program sold 200 metric tons of high quality maize grain. According to Minister of Agriculture Abdi Ahmed Mohamed, the government is working to further rehabilitate the farming sector through both agricultural production and stabilization efforts. Farmers ultimately aim to move beyond local distribution and become a major grain supplier for the broader region.

In March 2014, the Somali Producers' Conference and Exhibition (SOPEC) was held at Dubai's World Trade Center as part of an initiative by the federal government to promote Somali products from the farming, livestock and fisheries sectors in the United Arab Emirates and other Gulf state markets. In May of the year, commercial farmers also resumed banana exports to the Arabian peninsula. Additionally, they began exploring newer markets for their agricultural products in Kuwait and Dubai.

In December 2014, the Ministry of Agriculture announced that it would commence a new water management project on the Shabelle River in 2015 in order to assist small scale cultivators. The initiative will in part see additional water channels dug so as to more effectively control river flows on farms.

== Fishing ==
Somalia has the longest coastline on the mainland. Prior to the start of the civil war in 1991, the country had a number of fishing hubs. Tuna, lobster, and other high value marine stock were harvested locally for the domestic and international seafood markets. The government has since endeavoured to work with local communities to rebuild the fisheries industry and normalize trade. To this end, fishing fleets from Europe and Asia have reached commercial fishing agreements in the northeastern Puntland region.

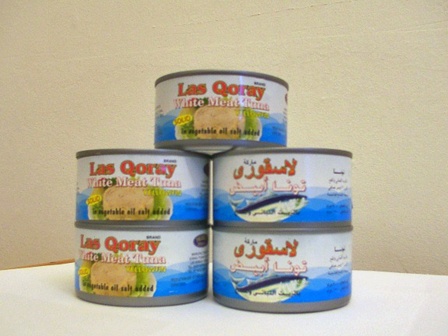
Cans of Las Qoray brand tuna fish made in Las Khorey.

In 2012, a team of engineers was also enlisted by the Puntland authorities to assess the ongoing renovations taking place at the Las Khorey port. According to the Minister of Ports, Said Mohamed Rage, the Puntland government intends to launch more such development projects in the town.

In April 2013, the Puntland Ministry of Fisheries and Marine Resources officially inaugurated a new fish market in Garowe. Constructed in conjunction with the UK authorities and the UNDP, it is part of a larger regional development plan which will see two other similar marketplaces launched within the year in Galkayo and Qardho.

In September 2013, Puntland Minister of Fisheries Mohamed Farah Adan also announced that the Puntland government plans to open two new marine training schools in Eyl and Bandar Siyada (Qaw), another northeastern coastal town. The institutes are intended to buttress the regional fisheries industry and enhance the skill set of the Ministry's personnel and local fishermen. Adan also indicated that the Ministry in conjunction with the FAO would open a new fish market in Bosaso, complete with modern refrigerators.

In March 2014, Puntland President Abdiweli Mohamed Ali in conjunction with representatives from the EU and FAO officially launched a new database for registering local fishermen. Referred to as the Fishermen Identification Database System, it is a $400,000 project financed by a Trust Fund from seven EU Member States. The database will provide fishermen in the region with a unique identification card. It uses biometric data, which can differentiate between the identities of individuals. Registering fishermen will allow the Puntland government to identify who fishes in its waters, and to ensure efficacious management of fisheries and sustainable resource use through the gathering of vital data. More than 3,100 fishermen already registered in the new biometric database over the previous 12 months.

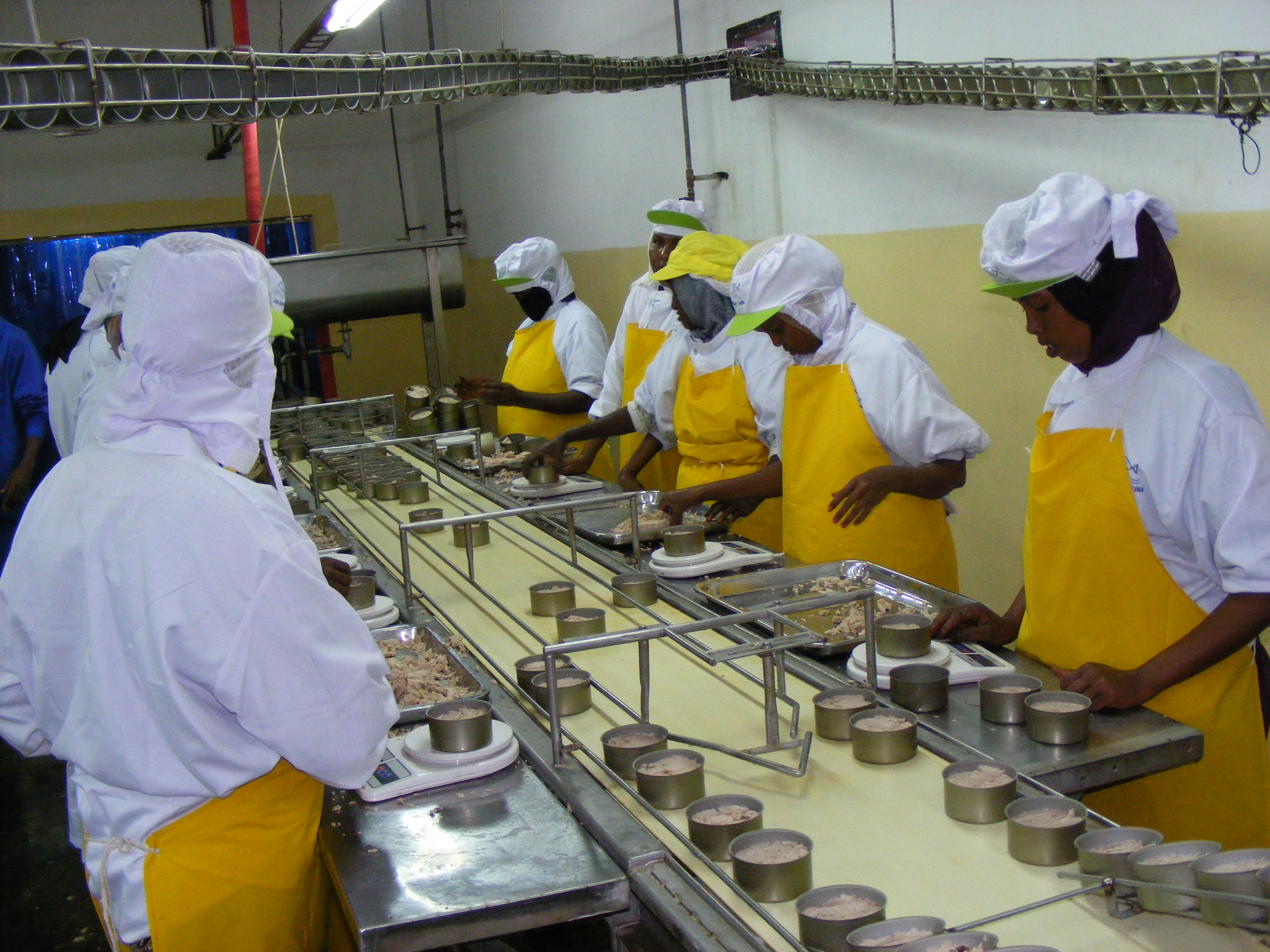
Tuna-processing factory in Las Khorey

In April 2014, a Somali federal government delegation including President Hassan Sheikh Mohamud, Minister of Fisheries and Marine Resources Mohamed Olow Barrow, Minister of Finance Hussein Abdi Halane, and Minister of Planning Said Abdullahi Mohamed met in Brussels with EU Development Commissioner Andris Piebalgs and Fisheries Commissioner Maria Damanaki to discuss bilateral relations. The talks were brokered by the Scottish Conservative Euro MP Struan Stevenson, with the aim of securing international funding for reconstruction of Somalia's fishing industry infrastructure. According to Stevenson, the EU's long-term objective is to set up a fisheries partnership agreement with the Somali authorities in order to tap into the country's abundant marine stocks.

In June 2014, the Fisheries Minister of the Puntland State of Somalia Hasan Mahmoud announced that the Somali and Yemeni governments are slated to sign a Memorandum of Understanding to regulate fishing within Somalia's territorial waters by Yemeni fishermen. The Puntland and Yemeni Fisheries ministries are also scheduled to hold talks on bilateral cooperation, with the aim of preserving and effectively exploiting marine resources.

In October 2014, in an extraordinary meeting in Mogadishu chaired by Second Deputy Speaker Mahad Abdalle Awad, the Federal Parliament passed a new Fishing Act. The law was forwarded to the legislature by the federal Ministry of Fisheries. Of the 140 lawmakers present at the parliamentary session, 135 MPs voted in favor of the bill, 2 voted against it, and 3 abstained.

== See also ==
- Ministry of Agriculture
