= Ministry of Planning Economic Development and International Cooperation =

Government ministry in Puntland

- Wasaaradda Qorshaynta, Horumarinta Dhaqaalaha iyo Iskaashiga Caalamiga ee Puntland

Agency overview
- Formed: 1 August 1998
- Jurisdiction: Government of Puntland
- Headquarters: Garowe, Puntland
- Employees: 51+
- Annual budget: $10 million USD 2016
- Minister responsible: Daud Mohamed Omar
- State Minister responsible: Shakir Mohamed Guled
- Agency executive: Abdulkadir A. Farah
- Website: https://mopic.pl.so/

The Ministry of Planning Economic Development and International Cooperation MoPEDIC or MoPIC (Somali: Wasaaradda Qorshaynta, Horumarinta Dhaqaalaha iyo Iskaashiga Caalamiga ee Puntland; Arabic: وزارة التخطيط والتنمية الاقتصادية والتعاون الدولي) is government ministry and was established in 1998 as a directorate of Puntland Bank system. In August 2001 the ministry has been structured and changed the previous name into the Ministry of Planning and International cooperation instead of directorate, in 2003-2005 the Ministry was renamed as the Ministry of Planning and statistics, then in 2006 it was named again as the Ministry of planning and international cooperation.
