= Mohamud Hayir Ibrahim =

Somali politician

former state minister of finance, former State Minister for Presidential Palace, former member of parliament, former deputy minister of finance, somalia
- In office 12 January 2015 – August, 2022
- Prime Minister: Omar Abdirashid Ali Sharmarke
- In office 2017–2022
- Prime Minister: hassan ali khaire

Personal details
- Born: 1981 (age 44–45) Bosaso, Puntland Somalia
- Party: Independent

Mohamoud Hayir Ibrahim is a Somali politician. Mohamud Hayir occupies a notable position in Puntland’s political sphere, where his leadership and influence have played an important role in shaping political discourse and policy direction. He was a candidate in the 2024 Puntland presidential election, but he withdrew his candidacy just days before the polls were set to open. He is considered as the longest serving ministry of finance official in the history of somalia holding the office from 2015 until 2022. He served as the deputy finance minister from 2015 to 2017 and from 2017 to 2022 he served as the state minister of finance. he also served as the State Minister for Presidential Palace of Somalia, having been appointed to the position on 12 January 2015 by Prime Minister Omar Abdirashid Ali Sharmarke. In 2009 He was elected as the chairman of Puntland chamber of commerce where he served until 2012. In 2012 he was elected as a member of Somalia parliament where he was then re-elected again in November 2016.
