= Coat of arms of Somalia =

- Armiger: Federal Republic of Somalia
- Adopted: 10 October 1956
- Crest: A mural crown Or
- Shield: Azure, a mullet argent within a bordure Or
- Supporters: Two leopards rampant proper
- Compartment: Two palm leaves Vert surmounted by two spears in saltire proper, interlaced with a scroll argent

The banner of arms, which serves as national flag

The coat of arms of Somalia was adopted on October 10, 1956, by the then Italian Trust Territory of Somaliland and features a golden framed shield of the Somali flag supported by two Leopards standing on spears. The Leopard is a common animal seen in Somalia. Leopards are a common motif in Somali culture. The arms were designed by the Italian Giuseppe Ricci, born in Ravenna on 29th of April, 1912.

== Official description ==
The Constitution of Somalia describes the coat of arms of the nation as follows:

The emblem of the Federal Republic of Somalia is a blue shield with a gold frame, in the centre of which is a silver-coated, five-pointed star. The shield is surmounted by a decorated emblem with five golden heads, with two lateral ones halved. The shield is borne from the sides by two leopards facing each other under the lower point of the shield, along with two palm leaves, which are interlaced with a white ribbon.

== Historical coats of arms ==
Coat of Arms of The Ottoman Empire (1846–1882)

Coat of Arms of The Ottoman Empire (1882–1884)

Coat of Arms of The Khedivate of Egypt (1874–1884)

Emblem of Sultanate of Hobyo (1876–1889)

Coat of arms of Kingdom of Italy (1889–1890)

Coat of arms of Italian Somaliland (1889–1941)

Coat of arms of Kingdom of Italy (1890–1929)

Coat of arms of United Kingdom (1884–1952)

Coat of arms of British Somaliland (1903–1950)

Coat of arms of British Somaliland (1950–1952)

Coat of arms of British Somaliland (1952-1960) and the short-lived State of Somaliland (1960)

Coat of arms of Fascist Italy (1929–1941)

Coat of arms of Italian East Africa (1938–1941)

Coat of arms of Somalia Governorate (1938–1941)

Emblem of Italy (1950–1960)

Coat of arms of the Italian Trust Territory of Somaliland (1950-1956)

Coat of arms of the Italian Trust Territory of Somaliland (1956-1960) and currently Coat of arms of the Federal Republic of Somalia (1956-present)

== Subnational emblems ==
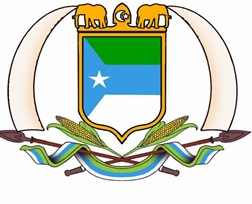
Jubaland

Himan and Heeb

Puntland

South West State of Somalia

North Eastern State of Somalia

Hirshabelle

Galmudug

== Armed Forces emblems ==
The Armed Forces branches have unique emblems based on the national coat of arms.

Armed Forces

Navy

Air Force
