= Waiye District =

District in Bari, Puntland

Waiye
- District
- Country: Somalia: Puntland
- Region: Bari
- Capital: Waiye
- Time zone: UTC+3 (EAT)

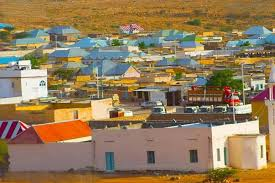
Waiye overhead view

Waiye District is a district in the northeastern Bari region of Somalia. Its capital of Waiye.
