= HCMA =

HCMA may refer to:

- Alula Airport (ICAO code) in Alula (also called Caluula) in Bari region of northeastern Somalia
- Huron-Clinton Metropolitan Authority, the body that administers the Huron–Clinton Metroparks system in the Metro Detroit area of Michigan, USA
