= Somalia =

Country in East Africa

Federal Republic of Somalia Jamhuuriyadda Federaalka Soomaaliya (Somali) جمهورية الصومال الفيدرالية (Arabic) Jumhūriyah aṣ-Ṣūmāl al-Fīdirāliyah
- Flag Coat of arms
- Anthem: Qolobaa Calankeed "Every Nation Has Its Own Flag"
- Territory controlled Territory claimed but not controlled
- Capital and largest city: Mogadishu; 2°2′N 45°21′E
- Official languages: Somali
- Second language: Arabic
- Ethnic groups (2021): 85% Somali; 15% other
- Religion: Sunni Islam (official) (Note: According to a 2010 report by the Pew Research Center (Pew Research Center 2012, p. 49), 99.8% of the population in Somalia adheres to Islam, with the remaining 0.2% practising other faiths or unaffiliated.)
- Demonym: Somali (Note: The demonym Somalian has also been used (see Etymology for further details).)
- Government: Federal parliamentary republic under a Provisional Constitution
  - President: Hassan Sheikh Mohamud (disputed) (Note: The presidency has been disputed since 15 May 2026, with Mohamud asserting that the constitutional amendments passed on 30 March 2024 means that he continues to be the legitimate president until 15 May 2027. The opposition dispute the constitutional amendments as being invalid, stating that the constitutional term of Mohamud expired on 15 May 2026 in accordance with the provisional constitution of Somalia.)
  - Prime Minister: Hamza Abdi Barre
  - First Deputy Prime Minister: Salah Jama
  - Second Deputy Prime Minister: Jibril Abdirashid Haji Abdi
- Legislature: Federal Parliament
  - Upper house: Senate
  - Lower house: House of the People

Establishment
  - Land of Punt: 2350 BC
  - Macrobia: 980 BC
  - Barbaria: 100 BC
  - Adal Sultanate: 9th century
  - Mogadishu Sultanate: 10th century
  - Sultanate of Ifat: 13th century
  - Ajuran Sultanate: 13th century
  - British Somaliland: 1884–1960
  - Italian Somaliland: 1889–1941
  - Independence of British Somaliland: 26 June 1960
  - Independence of Italian Somaliland: 1 July 1960
  - Unification of the Somali Republic: 1 July 1960
  - Current constitution: 1 August 2012

Area
  - Total: 637,657 km^{2} (246,201 sq mi) (43rd)

Population
  - 2026 estimate: ▲20,305,907 (64th)
  - Density: 27.2/km^{2} (70.4/sq mi)
- GDP (PPP): 2026 estimate
  - Total: ▲$34.118 billion (147st)
  - Per capita: ▲$1,965 (179th)
- GDP (nominal): 2026 estimate
  - Total: ▲$14.174 billion (145th)
  - Per capita: ▲$813 (177th)
- Gini (2022 (last available data)): 35.2 medium inequality
- HDI (2023): ▲0.404 low (192nd)
- Currency: Somali shilling (SOS)
- Time zone: UTC+3 (EAT)
- Calling code: +252
- ISO 3166 code: SO
- Internet TLD: .so

Somalia, (Note: /səˈmɑːliə, soʊ-/ sə-MAH-lee-ə, soh; Somali: Soomaaliya [soːmaːlija], Osmanya script: 𐒈𐒝𐒑𐒛𐒐𐒘𐒕𐒖; Arabic: الصومال, romanised: aṣ-Ṣūmāl) officially the Federal Republic of Somalia, (Note: Somali: Jamhuuriyadda Federaalka Soomaaliya; Arabic: جمهورية الصومال الفيدرالية) is the easternmost country in continental Africa. Stretching across the Horn of Africa, it borders Ethiopia to the west, Djibouti (Note: The Djiboutian–Somali border is de jure controlled by the internationally recognised Federal Republic of Somalia, but is de facto under the control of the partially recognised Republic of Somaliland.) to the northwest, Kenya to the southwest, the Gulf of Aden to the north, and the Indian Ocean to the east. Somalia has the longest coastline on Africa's mainland. Somalia has an estimated population over 19 million, of which 2.7 million live in the capital and largest city, Mogadishu. As one of Africa's most ethnically homogeneous countries, around 85% of its residents are ethnic Somalis. The official and national language of the country is Somali, and Arabic is recognised as a second language. The overwhelming majority of the population are Sunni Muslims.

In ancient history, Somalia was an important commercial centre. During the Middle Ages, several powerful Somali empires dominated the regional trade, including the Ajuran Sultanate, Adal Sultanate, and the Sultanate of the Geledi. In the late 19th century, the Somali sultanates were colonised by the Italian and British empires, who merged these tribal territories into two colonies: Italian Somaliland and British Somaliland. In 1960, the two territories united to form the independent Somali Republic under a civilian government. Siad Barre of the Supreme Revolutionary Council (SRC) seized power in 1969 and established the Somali Democratic Republic, launching a failed invasion of Ethiopia which triggered major instability in Somalia and brutally attempting to quash the Somaliland War of Independence in the north of the country.

The SRC collapsed in 1991 with the onset of the Somali Civil War. Instability continued through periods of reduced conflict under transitional governments in the early 2000s. At the end of 2006, a US-backed Ethiopian invasion overthrew the Islamic Courts Union (ICU), leading to the installation of the Transitional Federal Government of Somalia (TFG) in Mogadishu under an Ethiopian military occupation. The subsequent insurgency which emerged saw the ICU fragment into various rebel factions, including the militant group al-Shabaab, which waged a protracted conflict against Ethiopian forces, the two powers exchanging control of territories through mid-2012. A new provisional constitution was passed in August 2012, reforming Somalia as a federation and began reconstruction under the Federal Government of Somalia. Insurgents still control much of central and southern Somalia and influence government-controlled areas.

Somalia is among the least developed countries in the world because of its low GDP per capita and the Human Development Index. It has maintained an informal economy mainly based on livestock, remittances from Somalis working abroad, and telecommunications. It is a member of the United Nations, the Arab League, African Union, Non-Aligned Movement, East African Community, and the Organisation of Islamic Cooperation.

In 2026 the United Nations and the World Food Programme warned that six million people or one third of Somalia's population were facing food crises and that 1.9 million children faced acute malnutrition, primarily due to a severe drought and cut in aid expenditures.

== Etymology ==
Samaale, the last common ancestor of several Somali clans, is generally regarded as the source of the ethnonym Somali. Another theory is that the name is derived from the words soo and maal, which together mean "go" and "milk". This interpretation varies depending on region, with northern Somalis believing it means "camel's milk," and southern Somalis using the transliteration "sa maal", which refers to cow's milk. This is a reference to the pastoralism of the Somali people. Another proposed etymology is that the term Somali is derived from the Arabic ذوو مال, transliterated as dhawu māl and meaning "wealthy", again referring to Somali riches in livestock.

The first written reference of the sobriquet Somali dates back to the early 15th century AD during the reign of Ethiopian Emperor Yeshaq I, who had one of his court officials compose a hymn celebrating a military victory over the Sultanate of Ifat. Simur was also an ancient Harari alias for the Somali people.

== History ==
=== Prehistory ===
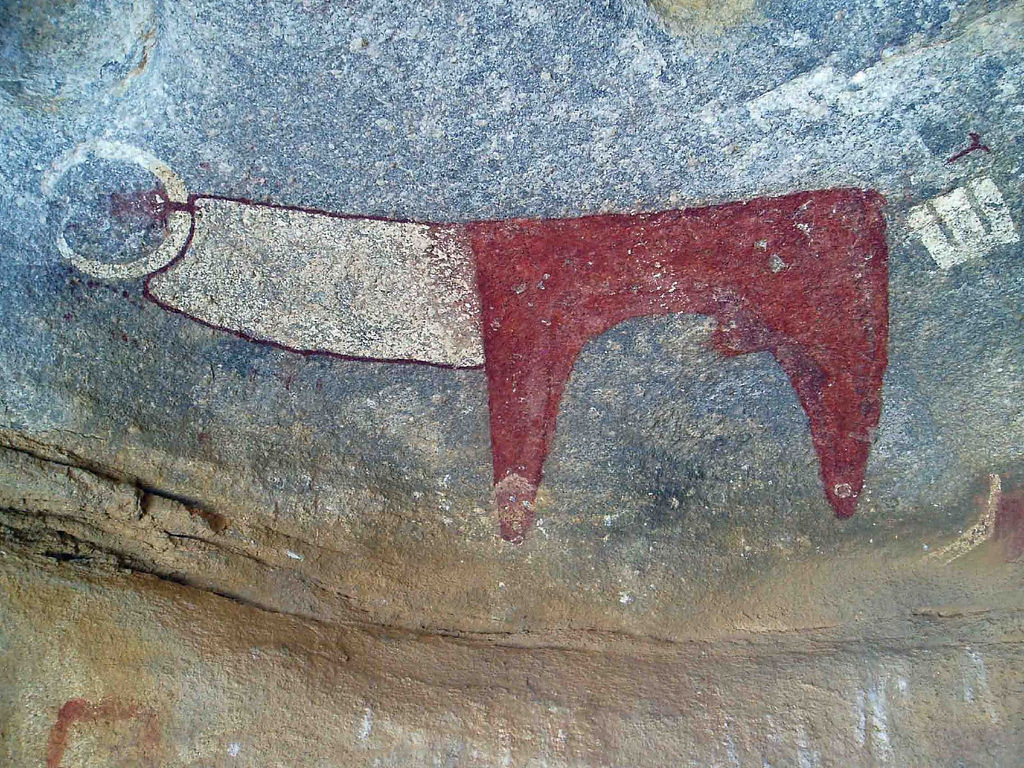
Neolithic rock art at the Laas Geel complex depicting a long-horned cow

Somalia was likely one of the first lands to be settled by early humans due to its location. Hunter-gatherers who would later migrate out of Africa likely settled here before their migrations. During the Stone Age, the Doian and Hargeisan cultures flourished here. The oldest evidence of burial customs in the Horn of Africa comes from cemeteries in Somalia dating back to the 4th millennium BC. The stone implements from the Jalelo site in the north were also characterised in 1909 as important artefacts demonstrating the archaeological universality during the Paleolithic between the East and the West.

According to linguists, the first Afroasiatic-speaking populations arrived in the region during the ensuing Neolithic period from the family's proposed urheimat ("original homeland") in the Nile Valley, or the Near East.

The Laas Geel complex on the outskirts of Hargeisa in northwestern Somalia dates back approximately 5,000 years, and has rock art depicting both wild animals and decorated cows. Other cave paintings are found in the northern Dhambalin region, which feature one of the earliest known depictions of a hunter on horseback. The rock art is dated to 1,000 to 3,000 BC. Additionally, between the towns of Las Khorey and El Ayo in northern Somalia lies Karinhegane, the site of numerous cave paintings, which collectively have been estimated to be around 2,500 years old.

The camel is believed to have been domesticated in the Horn region between the 2nd and 3rd millennium BC. From there, it spread to Egypt and the Maghreb.

=== Classical era ===
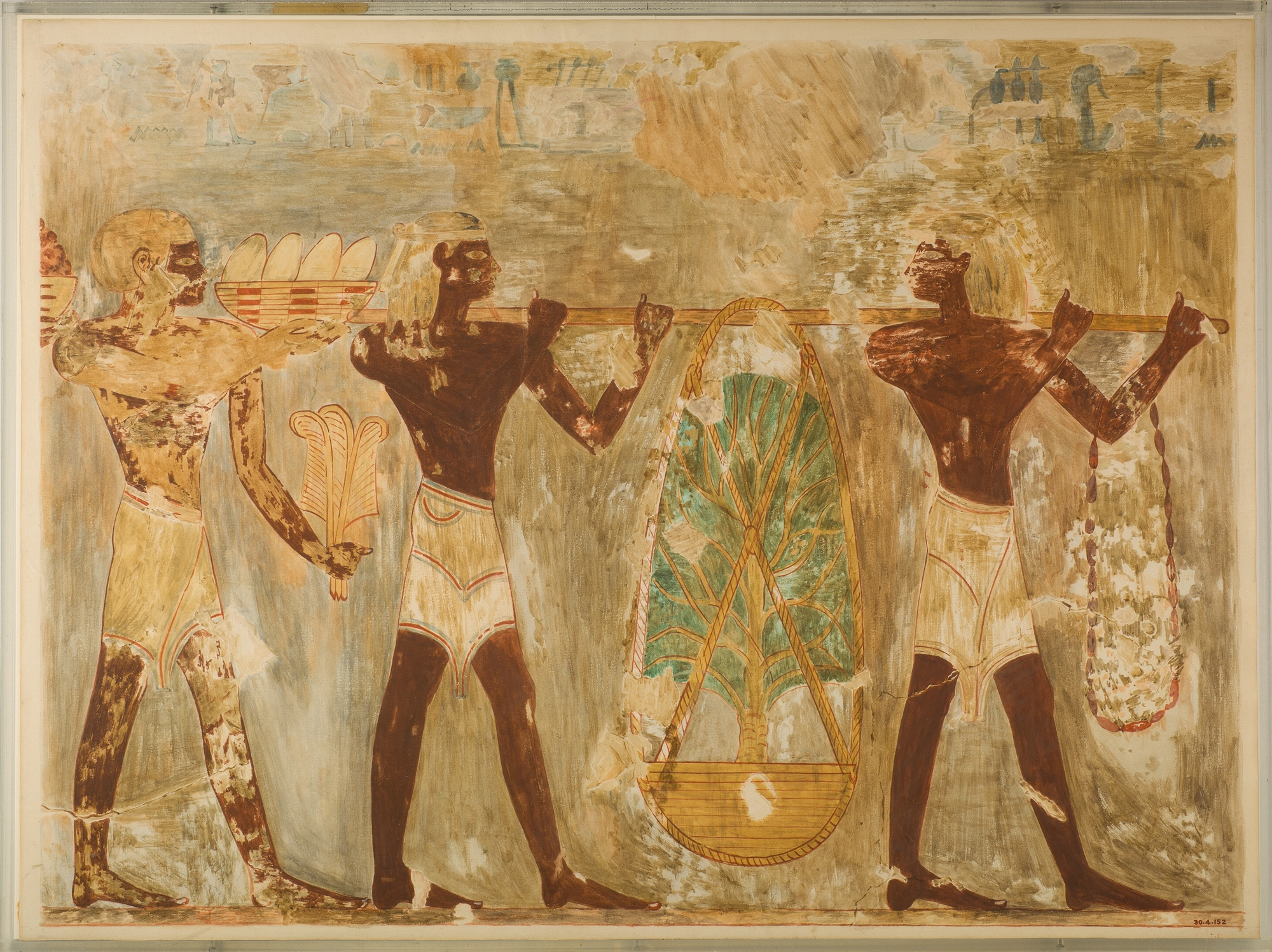
Men from Punt carrying gifts, as depicted on the tomb of Rekhmire.

Ancient pyramidical structures, mausoleums, ruined cities and stone walls, such as the Wargaade Wall, are evidence of an old civilisation that once thrived in the Somali peninsula. This civilisation enjoyed a trading relationship with ancient Egypt and Mycenaean Greece since the second millennium BC, supporting the hypothesis that Somalia or adjacent regions were the location of the ancient Land of Punt. The Puntites native to the region traded myrrh, spices, gold, ebony, short-horned cattle, ivory and frankincense with the Egyptians, Phoenicians, Babylonians, Indians, Chinese, and Romans through their commercial ports. An Egyptian expedition sent to Punt by the 18th dynasty Queen Hatshepsut is recorded on the temple reliefs at Deir el-Bahari, during the reign of the Puntite King Parahu and Queen Ati.

In the classical era, the Macrobians, who may have been ancestral to Somalis, established a powerful kingdom that ruled large parts of modern Somalia. They were reputed for their longevity and wealth, and were said to be the "tallest and handsomest of all men". The Macrobians were warrior herders and seafarers. According to Herodotus' account, the Persian Emperor Cambyses II, upon his conquest of Egypt in 525 BC, sent ambassadors to Macrobia, bringing luxury gifts for the Macrobian king to entice his submission. The Macrobian ruler, who was elected based on his stature and beauty, replied instead with a challenge for his Persian counterpart in the form of an unstrung bow: if the Persians could manage to draw it, they would have the right to invade his country; but until then, they should thank the gods that the Macrobians never decided to invade their empire. The Macrobians were a regional power reputed for their advanced architecture and gold wealth, which was so plentiful that they shackled their prisoners in golden chains.

During the classical period, the Barbara city-states of Mosylon, Opone, Mundus, Isis, Malao, Avalites, Essina, Nikon and Sarapion developed a lucrative trade network, connecting with merchants from Ptolemaic Egypt, Ancient Greece, Phoenicia, Parthian Persia, Saba, the Nabataean Kingdom, and the Roman Empire. They used the ancient Somali maritime vessel known as the beden to transport their cargo.

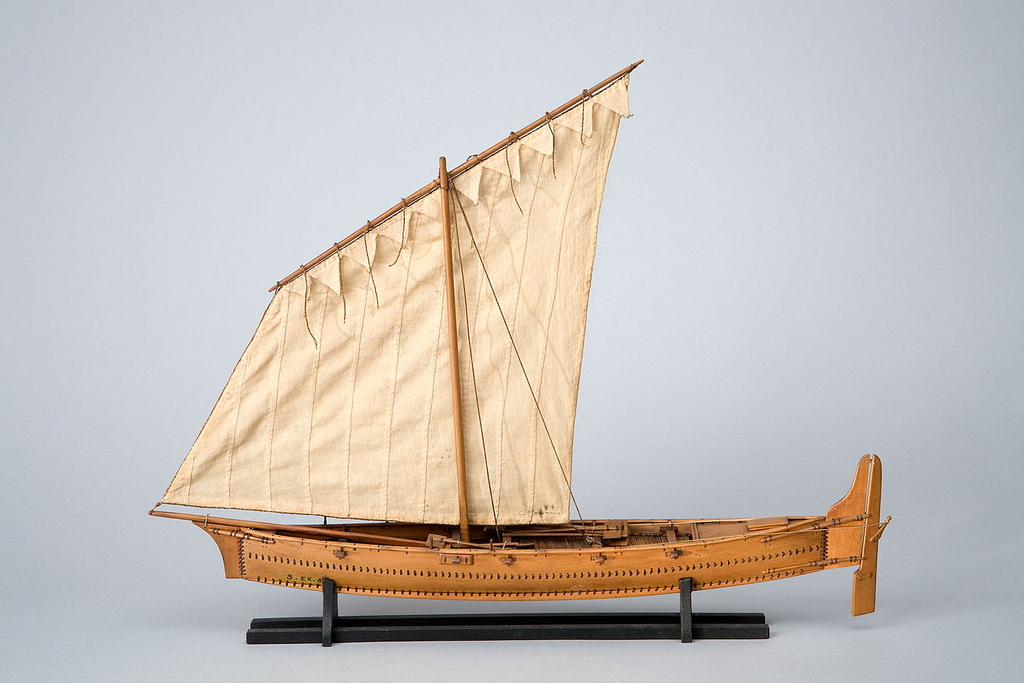
The beden is a fast, ancient Somali single or double-masted maritime ship.

After the Roman conquest of the Nabataean Empire and the Roman naval presence at Aden to curb piracy, Arab and Somali merchants agreed with the Romans to bar Indian ships from trading in the free port cities of the Arabian peninsula to protect the interests of Somali and Arab merchants in the lucrative commerce between the Red and Mediterranean Seas. However, Indian merchants continued to trade in the port cities of the Somali peninsula, which was free from Roman interference. For centuries, Indian merchants brought large quantities of cinnamon to Somalia and Arabia from Ceylon and the Spice Islands. The source of the cinnamon and other spices is said to have been the best-kept secret of Arab and Somali merchants in their trade with the Roman and Greek world; the Romans and Greeks believed the source to have been the Somali peninsula. The collusive agreement among Somali and Arab traders inflated the price of Indian and Chinese cinnamon in North Africa, the Near East, and Europe, and made the cinnamon trade a very profitable revenue generator, especially for the Somali merchants.

=== Islamic era ===
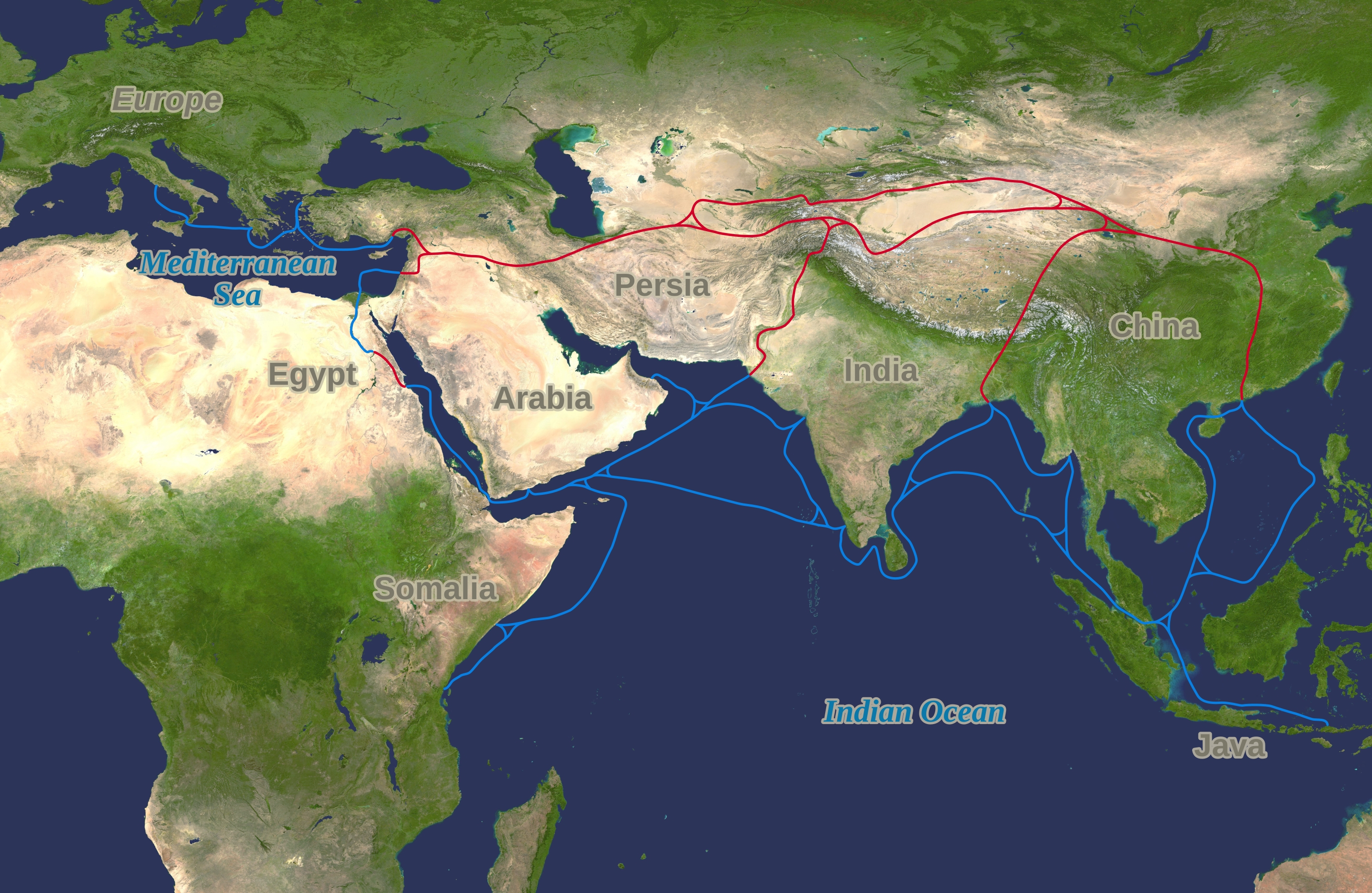
The Silk Road extending from China to southern Europe, Arabia, Somalia, Egypt, Persia, India, and Java

Islam was introduced to the area early on by the first Muslims of Mecca fleeing prosecution during the first Hejira with Masjid al-Qiblatayn in Zeila being built before the Qiblah towards Mecca. It is one of the oldest mosques in Africa. In the late 9th century, Al-Yaqubi wrote that Muslims were living along the northern Somali seaboard. He also mentioned that the Adal Kingdom had its capital in the city. According to Leo Africanus, the Adal Sultanate was governed by local Somali dynasties and its realm encompassed the geographical area between the Bab-el-Mandeb and Cape Guardafui. It was thus flanked to the south by the Ajuran Empire and to the west by the Abyssinian Empire.

Throughout the Middle Ages, Arab immigrants arrived in Somaliland, a historical experience which would later lead to the legendary stories about Muslim sheikhs such as Daarood and Ishaaq bin Ahmed (the purported ancestors of the Darod and Isaaq clans, respectively) travelling from Arabia to Somalia and marrying into the local Dir clan. The oldest writing in Somalia dates to this time, with the funerary inscription of Ḥajj Shānid in the al-Jami mosque in Barawa dating to 1104 or 1105 CE (year 498 AH). Although these medieval inscriptions are in Arabic, they were clearly written by people who were well-integrated into Somali culture and society. For example, an inscription from 1365 CE calls this year a Saturday year, using the traditional Somali calendar where years are named after the weekday on which the year begins.

In 1332, the Zeila-based King of Adal was slain in a military campaign aimed at halting Abyssinian emperor Amda Seyon I's march toward the city. When the last Sultan of Ifat, Sa'ad ad-Din II, was also killed by Emperor Dawit I in Zeila in 1410, his children escaped to Yemen, before returning in 1415. In the early 15th century, Adal's capital was moved further inland to the town of Dakkar, where Sabr ad-Din II, the eldest son of Sa'ad ad-Din II, established a new base after his return from Yemen.

Muslim Chinese diplomat Zheng He visited Mogadishu in his voyages to the horn of Africa.

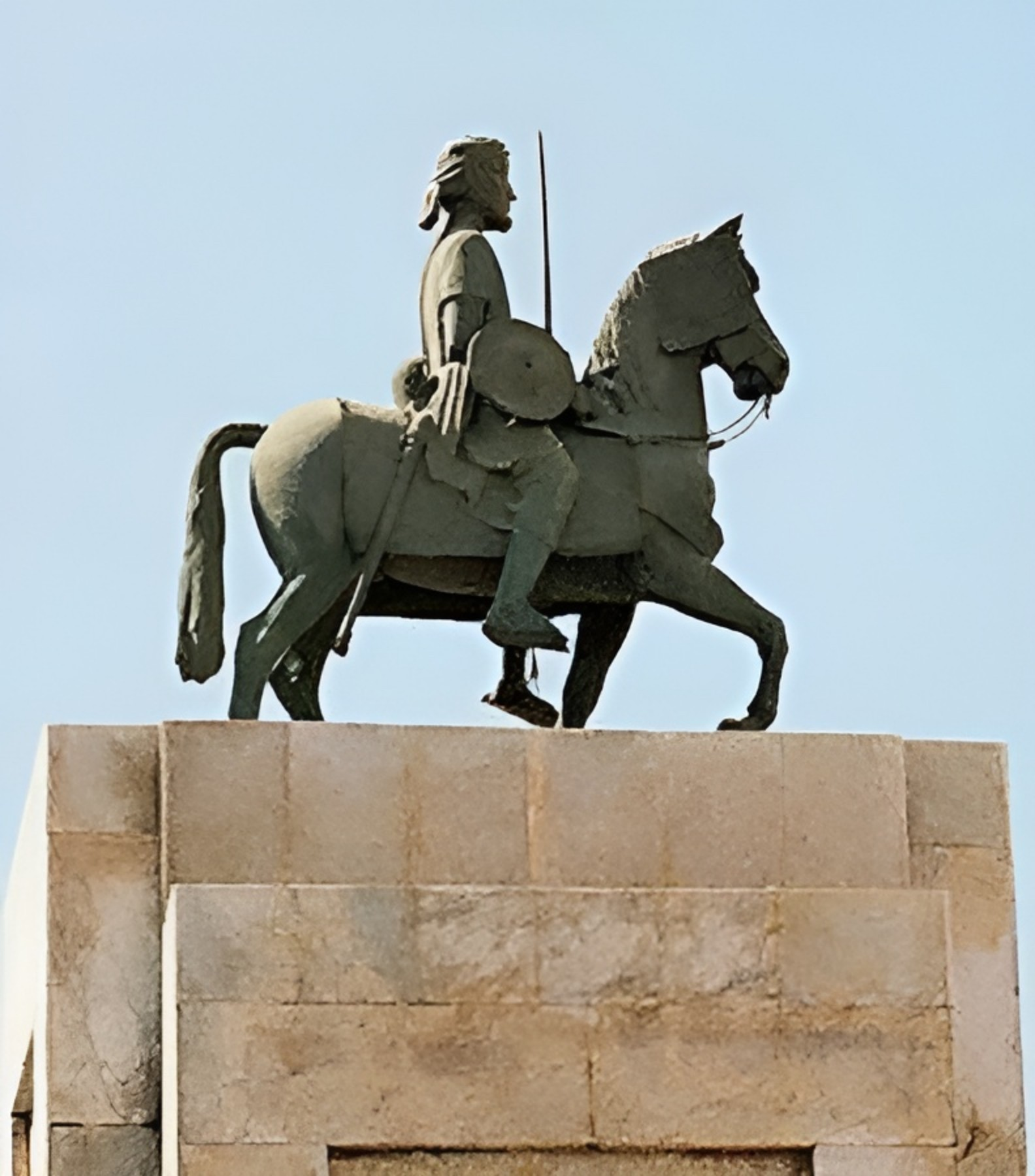
Statue of Ahmed ibn Ibrahim al-Ghazi, Imam of the Adal Empire

Adal's headquarters were again relocated the following century, this time southward to Harar. From this new capital, Adal organised an effective army led by Imam Ahmad ibn Ibrahim al-Ghazi, (commonly named ግራኝ አህመድ (Grañ Ahmed) in Amharic and Gurey in Somali, both meaning "the left-handed") and his closest top general and brother in law Garad Matan. Imam Ahmed clan is documented to be from the Geri Koombe, a sub clan of Darod. This 16th-century campaign is historically known as the Conquest of Abyssinia (Futuh al-Habash). During the war, Imam Ahmad pioneered the use of cannons supplied by the Ottoman Empire, which he imported through Zeila and deployed against Abyssinian forces and their Portuguese allies led by Cristóvão da Gama.

During the Ajuran Sultanate period, the city-states and republics of Merca, Mogadishu, Barawa, Hobyo and their respective ports flourished and had a lucrative foreign commerce with ships sailing to and from Arabia, India, Venetia, Persia, Egypt, Portugal, and as far away as China. Vasco da Gama, who passed by Mogadishu in the 15th century, noted that it was a large city with houses several storeys high and large palaces in its centre, in addition to many mosques with cylindrical minarets. The Harla, an early Hamitic group of tall stature who inhabited parts of Somalia, Tchertcher and other areas in the Horn, also erected various tumuli. These masons are believed to have been ancestral to ethnic Somalis.

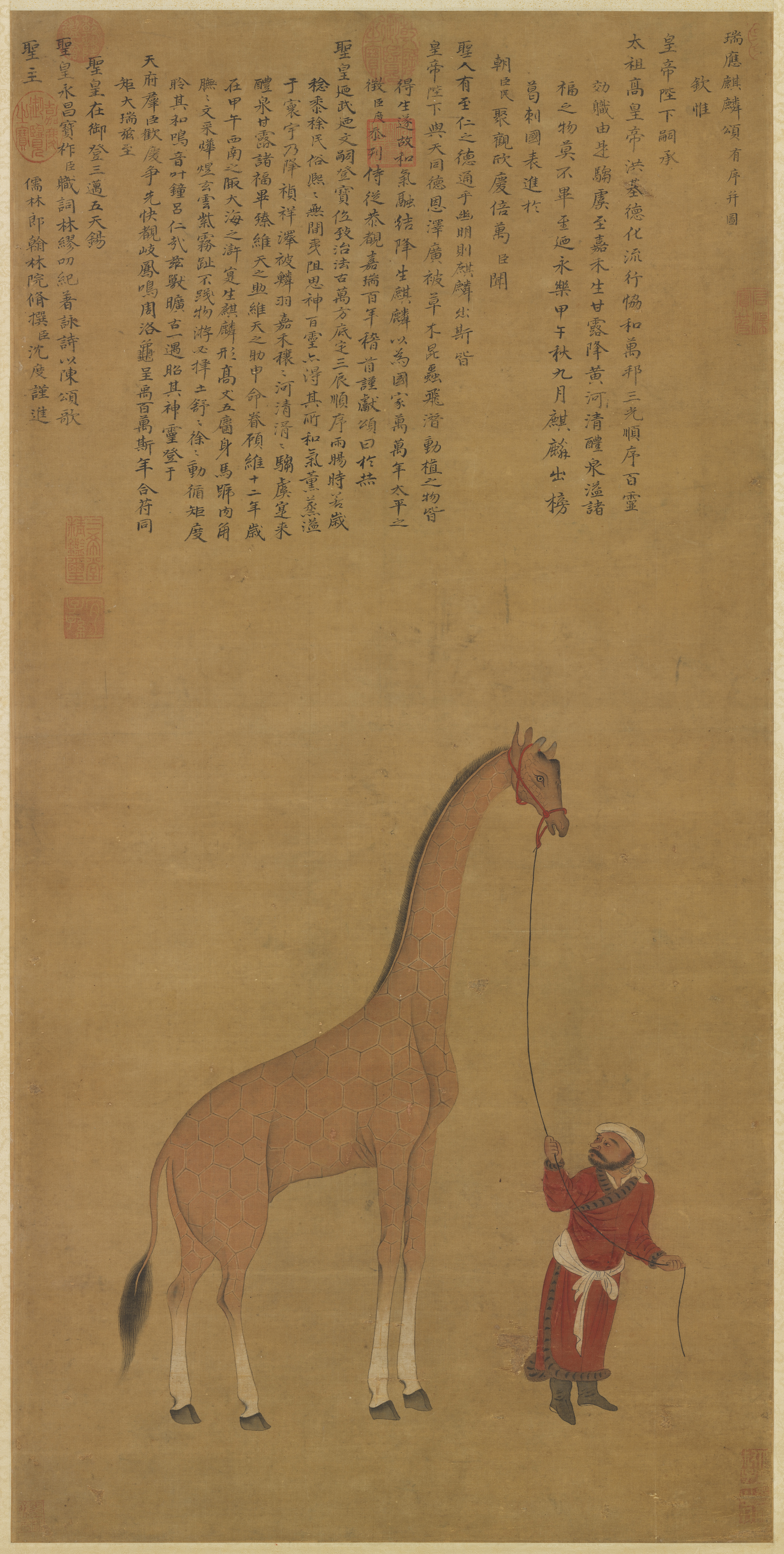
The Ajuran Sultanate maintained commercial ties with the Ming dynasty and other kingdoms (c. 1400s)

In the 16th century, Duarte Barbosa noted that many ships from the Kingdom of Cambaya in modern-day India sailed to Mogadishu with cloth and spices, for which they in return received gold, wax and ivory. Barbosa also highlighted the abundance of meat, wheat, barley, horses, and fruit on the coastal markets, which generated enormous wealth for the merchants. Mogadishu, the centre of a thriving textile industry known as toob benadir (specialised for the markets in Egypt, among other places), together with Merca and Barawa, also served as a transit stop for Swahili merchants from Mombasa and Malindi and for the gold trade from Kilwa. Jewish merchants from the Hormuz brought their Indian textile and fruit to the Somali coast in exchange for grain and wood.

Trading relations were established with Malacca in the 15th century, with cloth, ambergris and porcelain being the main commodities of the trade. Giraffes, zebras and incense were exported to the Ming Empire of China, which established Somali merchants as leaders in the commerce between East Asia and the Horn. Hindu merchants from Surat and Southeast African merchants from Pate, seeking to bypass both the Portuguese India blockade (and later the Omani interference), used the Somali ports of Merca and Barawa (which were out of the two powers' direct jurisdiction) to conduct their trade in safety and without interference.

=== Modern era ===
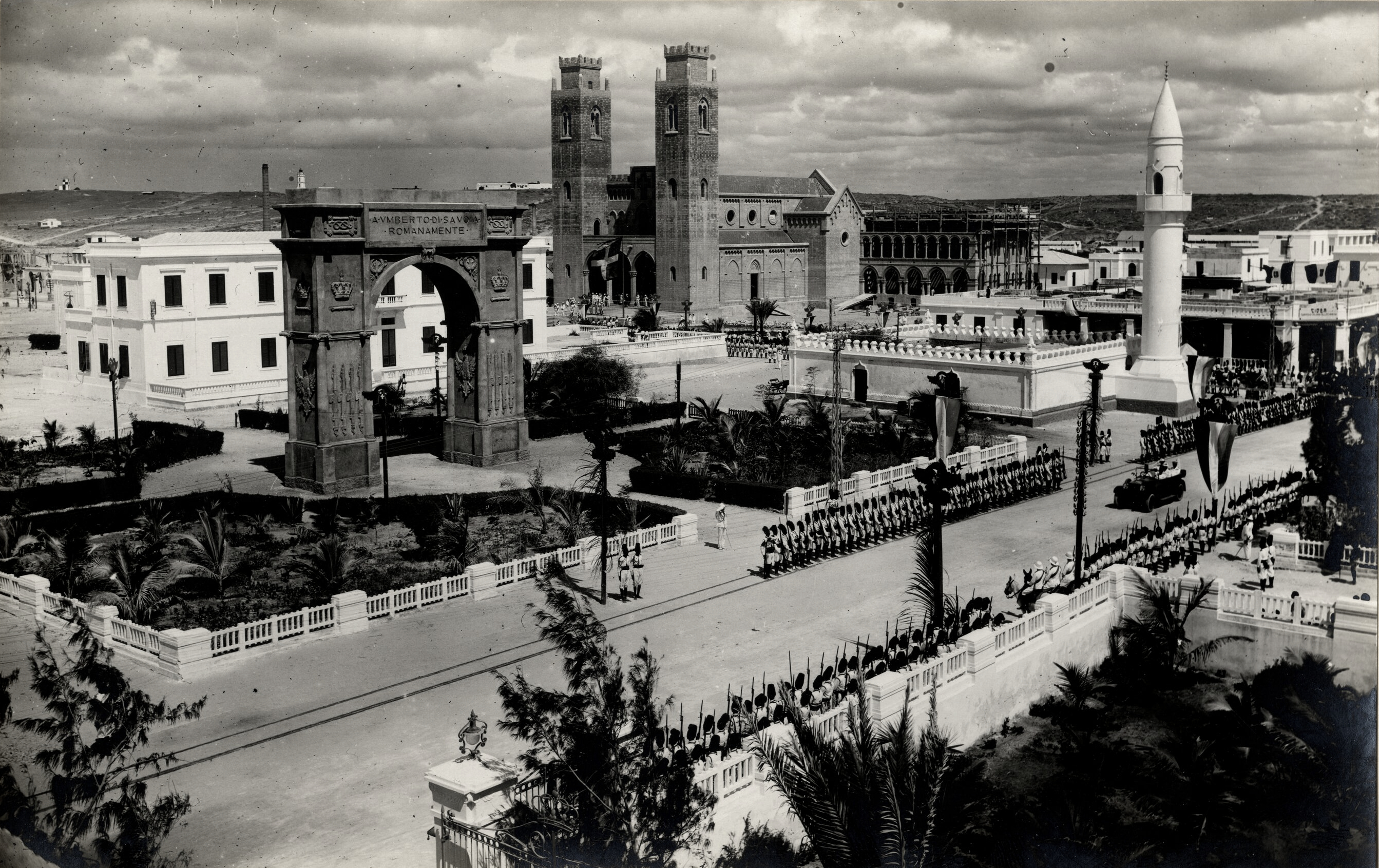
Mogadishu during Italian Somaliland period with the Catholic Cathedral at the centre and the Arch monument in honour of King Umberto I of Italy, 1928

In the early modern period, successor states to the Adal Sultanate and Ajuran Sultanate began to flourish in Somalia. These included the Hiraab Imamate, the Isaaq Sultanate led by the Guled dynasty, the Habr Yunis Sultanate led by the Ainanshe dynasty, the Sultanate of the Geledi (Gobroon dynasty), the Majeerteen Sultanate (Migiurtinia), and the Sultanate of Hobyo (Obbia). They continued the tradition of castle-building and seaborne trade established by previous Somali empires.

Sultan Yusuf Mahamud Ibrahim, the third Sultan of the House of Gobroon, started the golden age of the Gobroon Dynasty. His army came out victorious during the Bardheere Jihad, which restored stability in the region and revitalised the East African ivory trade. He also had cordial relations and received gifts from the rulers of neighbouring and distant kingdoms such as the Omani, Witu, and Yemeni Sultans.

Sultan Ibrahim's son Ahmed Yusuf succeeded him as one of the most important figures in 19th-century East Africa, receiving tribute from Omani governors and creating alliances with important Muslim families on the East African coast.

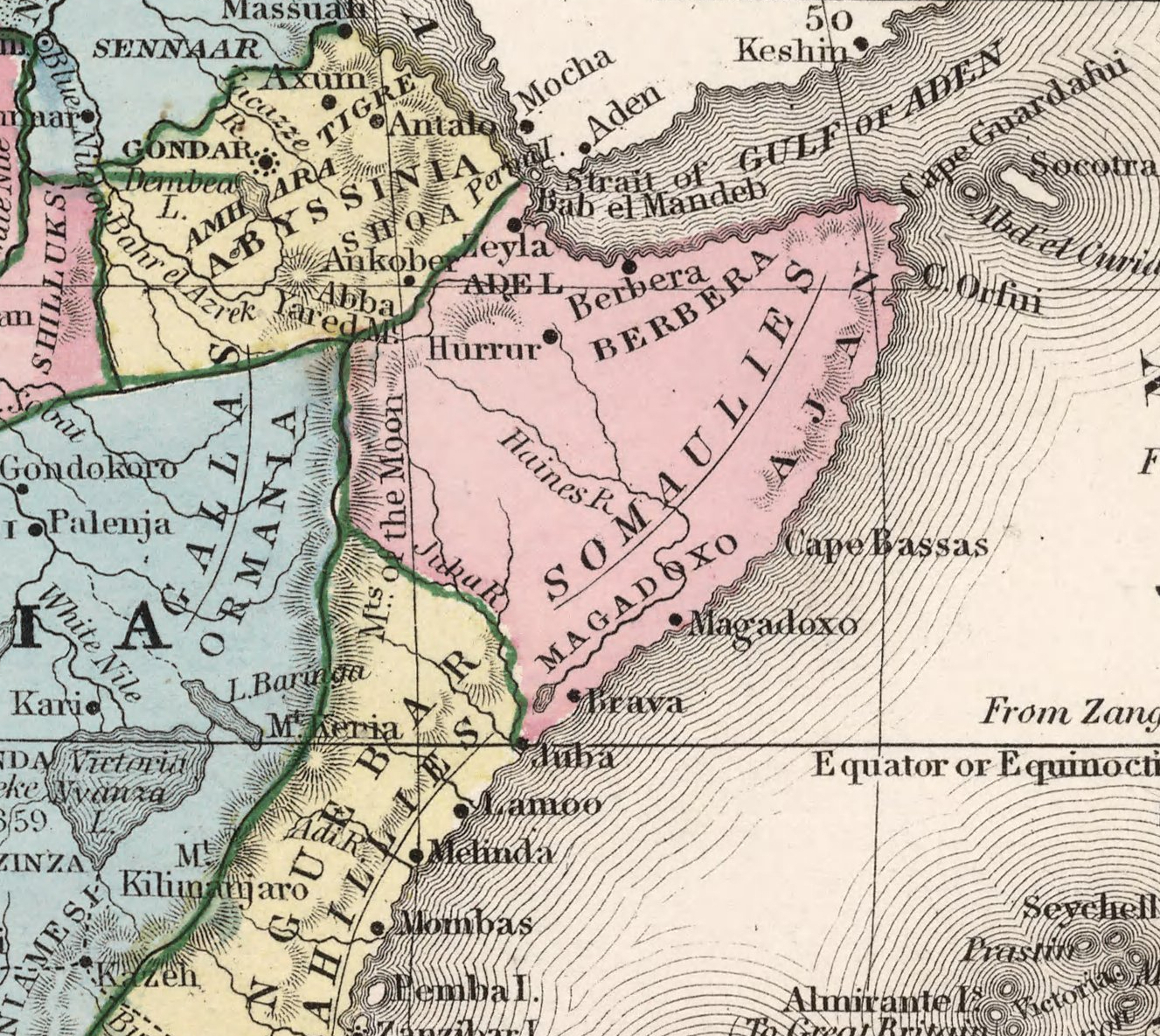
An 1865 map showing the territory of the Somaulies (Somalis) prior to the Scramble for Africa.

In Somaliland, the Isaaq Sultanate was established in 1750. The Isaaq Sultanate was a Somali kingdom that ruled parts of the Horn of Africa during the 18th and 19th centuries. It spanned the territories of the Isaaq clan, descendants of the Banu Hashim clan, in modern-day Somaliland and Ethiopia. The sultanate was governed by the Rer Guled branch established by the first sultan, Sultan Guled Abdi, of the Eidagale clan. According to oral tradition, prior to the Guled dynasty the Isaaq clan-family were ruled by a dynasty of the Tolje'lo branch starting from, descendants of Ahmed nicknamed Tol Je'lo, the eldest son of Sheikh Ishaaq's Harari wife. There were eight Tolje'lo rulers in total, starting with Boqor Harun (Somali: Boqor Haaruun) who ruled the Isaaq Sultanate for centuries starting from the 13th century. The last Tolje'lo ruler Garad Dhuh Barar (Somali: Dhuux Baraar) was overthrown by a coalition of Isaaq clans. The once strong Tolje'lo clan were scattered and took refuge amongst the Habr Awal with whom they still mostly live.

In the late 19th century, after the Berlin Conference of 1884, European powers began the Scramble for Africa. In that year, a British protectorate was declared over part of Somalia, on the African coast opposite South Yemen. Initially, this region was under the control of the Indian Office, and so administered as part of the Indian Empire; in 1898 it was transferred to control by London. In 1889, the protectorate and later colony of Italian Somalia was officially established by Italy through various treaties signed with a number of chiefs and sultans; Sultan Yusuf Ali Kenadid first sent a request to Italy in late December 1888 to make his Sultanate of Hobyo an Italian protectorate before later signing a treaty in 1889.

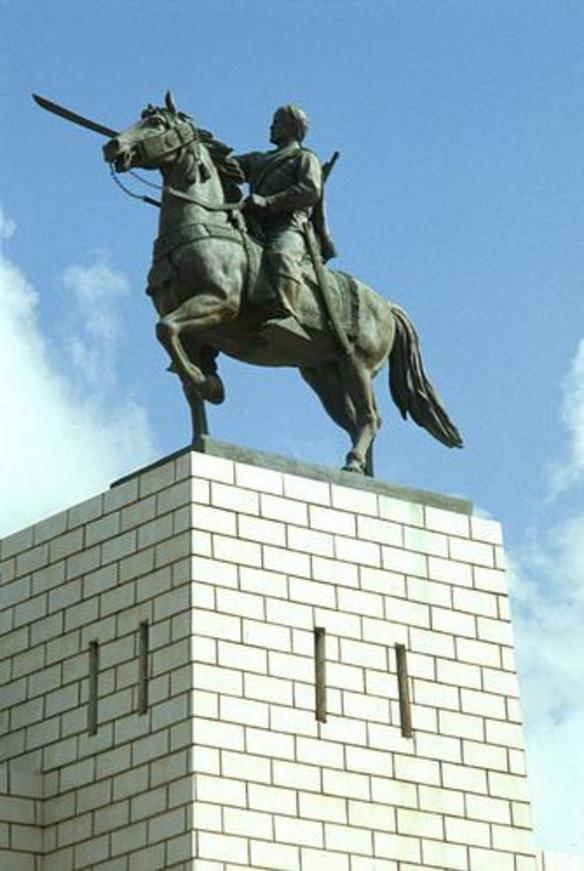
Statue of Muhammed Abdullah Hassan, Leader of the Dervishes

The Dervish movement successfully repulsed the British Empire four times and forced it to retreat to the coastal region. The Darawiish defeated the Italian, British, Abyssinian colonial powers on numerous occasions, most notably, the 1903 victory at Cagaarweyne commanded by Suleiman Aden Galaydh, forcing the British Empire to retreat to the coastal region in the early 1900s. The Dervishes were finally defeated in 1920 by British airpower.

The dawn of fascism in the early 1920s heralded a change of strategy for Italy, as the north-eastern sultanates were soon to be forced within the boundaries of La Grande Somalia ("Greater Somalia") according to the plan of Fascist Italy. With the arrival of Governor Cesare Maria De Vecchi on 15 December 1923, things began to change for that part of Somaliland known as Italian Somaliland. De Vecchi was responsible for an aggressive expansion campaign and large construction projects, including the cathedral of Mogadishu. The last piece of land acquired by Italy in Somalia was Oltre Giuba, present-day Jubaland region, in 1925.

The Italians began local infrastructure projects, including the construction of hospitals, farms and schools. Fascist Italy, under Benito Mussolini, attacked Abyssinia (Ethiopia) in 1935, with an aim to colonise it. The invasion was condemned by the League of Nations, but little was done to stop it or to liberate occupied Ethiopia. In 1936, Italian Somalia was integrated into Italian East Africa, alongside Eritrea and Ethiopia, as the Somalia Governorate. On 3 August 1940, Italian troops, including Somali colonial units, crossed from Ethiopia to invade British Somaliland, and by 14 August, succeeded in taking Berbera from the British.

Leaders of the Isaaq clan in Hargeisa during a Royal visit in British Somaliland, November 1958

A British force, including troops from several African countries, launched the campaign in January 1941 from Kenya to liberate British Somaliland and Italian-occupied Ethiopia and conquer Italian Somaliland. By February most of Italian Somaliland was captured and, in March, British Somaliland was retaken from the sea. The forces of the British Empire operating in Somaliland comprised the three divisions of South African, West African, and East African troops. They were assisted by Somali forces led by Abdulahi Hassan with Somalis of the Isaaq, Dhulbahante, and Warsangali clans prominently participating. The number of Italian Somalis began to decline after World War II, with fewer than 10,000 remaining in 1960.

=== Independence and post-independence ===
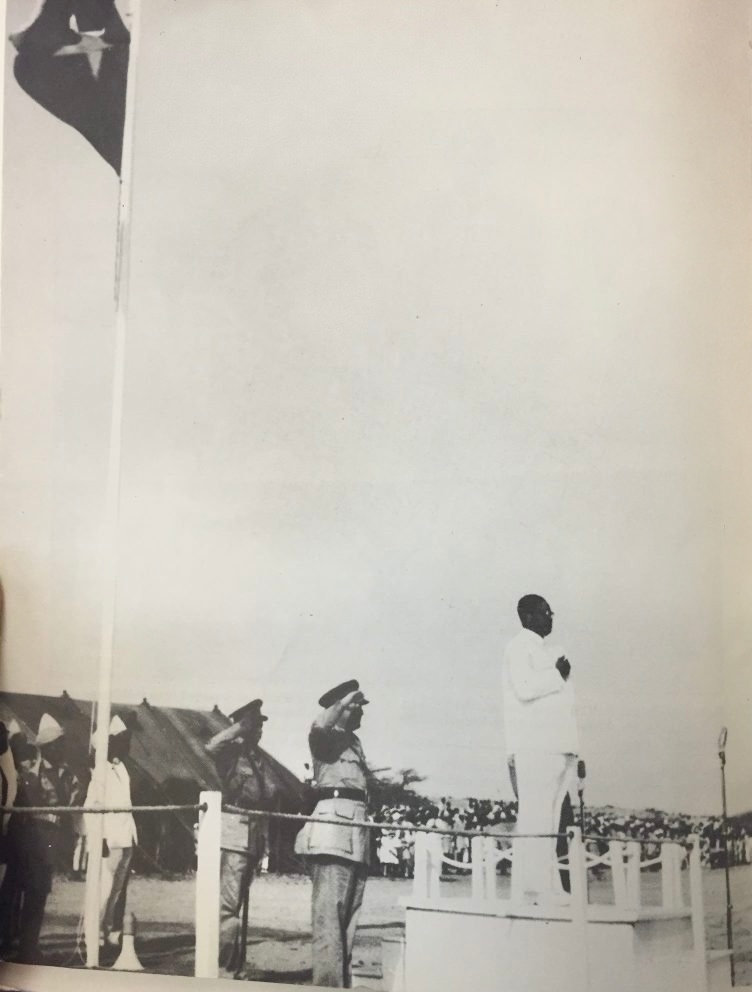
The Somali flag being raised during the independence celebrations of the State of Somaliland on 26 June 1960

Following World War II, Britain controlled both British Somaliland and Italian Somaliland. During the 1945 Potsdam Conference, the United Nations granted Italy Italian Somaliland, on the condition that Somalia achieve independence within ten years, due to pressure from Somali organisations. British Somaliland remained a protectorate of Britain until 1960.

The trusteeship gave Somalis the opportunity to gain experience in Western political education and self-government. These were advantages that British Somaliland lacked, as it was to be incorporated into the new Somali state. In the 1950s British officials attempted, to improve various administrative development efforts. However, the protectorate stagnated administratively. The disparity between the two territories would cause difficulties integrating.

In 1948, pressured by their allies and disappointing the Somalis, the British returned the Haud, an important Somali grazing area, and the Somali Region to Ethiopia, based on a treaty they signed in 1897 in which the British ceded Somali territory to the Ethiopian Emperor.

Britain stipulated that Somali residents would retain autonomy, but Ethiopia ignored this, prompting an unsuccessful bid by Britain to repurchase the lands. Britain also granted almost exclusively Somali-inhabited Northern Frontier District to Kenyan nationalists. This was despite a plebiscite where almost all of the territory's ethnic Somalis favoured joining Somalia.

A referendum was held in neighbouring French Somaliland in 1958, to decide whether to join the Somali Republic or to remain with France. The referendum turned out in favour of a continued association with France, largely due to a combined yes vote by the sizeable Afar ethnic group and resident Europeans. There was also widespread vote rigging, with the French expelling thousands of Somalis before voting commenced. The majority of those who voted "no" were Somalis, who strongly supported joining Somalia.

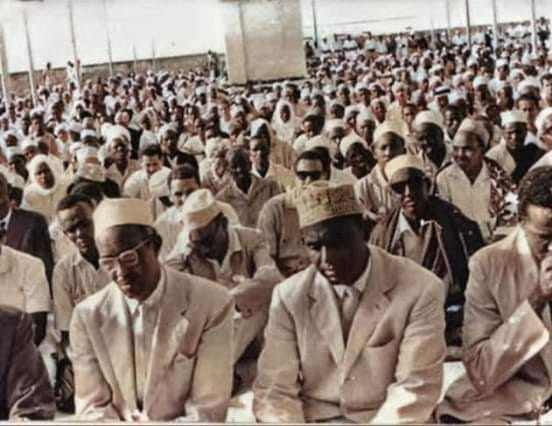
President Aden Adde (left) alongside Prime Minister Abdirashid Ali Sharmarke during Eid Khutbah in Mogadishu, 1964

A street scene in Mogadishu in 1966, featuring the 13th-century Arba'a Rukun Mosque

British Somaliland obtained independence on 26 June 1960, and Italian Somaliland followed on 1 July, with the two uniting to form the Somali Republic, within boundaries drawn up by Italy and Britain. A government was formed by members of the former trusteeship and protectorate governments, with Abdulcadir Muhammed Aden as President of the Somali National Assembly, Aden Abdullah Osman Daar as President of the Somali Republic, and Abdirashid Ali Shermarke as Prime Minister (later to become president from 1967 to 1969). On 20 July 1961, a popular referendum, was ratified by the people of Italian Somalia. Most people did not participate, although only a small number voted against the new constitution. In 1967, Muhammad Haji Ibrahim Egal became Prime Minister, a position to which he was appointed by Shermarke. Egal would later become the President of the autonomous Somaliland region in northwestern Somalia.

On 15 October, when President Abdirashid Ali Sharmarke was touring Las Anood, his bodyguard killed him, he was acting on his own accord, according to Henry Kissinger. Six days later, on 21 October, General Siad Barre led a military coup which overthrew the parliamentary government. The coup was motivated by corruption. The bodyguard was tried and executed by the Supreme Revolutionary Council (SRC). He came from the same clan background as the president.

Alongside Barre, the SRC was led by Brigadier General Mohamed Ainanshe Guled, Lieutenant Colonel Salaad Gabeyre Kediye, and Chief of Police Jama Korshel. Kediye officially held the title "Father of the Revolution", and afterwards, Barre became the head of the SRC. The SRC subsequently renamed the country to the Somali Democratic Republic, dissolved the parliament and the Supreme Court, and suspended the constitution.

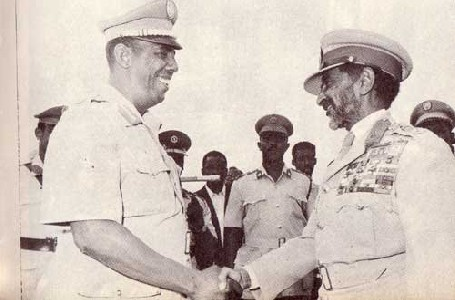
President Siad Barre (1969–1991), left, and visiting Ethiopian Emperor Haile Selassie (r. 1930–1974) in Mogadishu, October 1971

The revolutionary government developed infrastructure and implemented a literacy campaign, dramatically increasing the literacy rate to 70%, then one of the highest in Africa. The new regime's foreign policy emphasised Somalia's links with the Arab world, eventually joining the Arab League. That same year, Barre also served as chairman of the Organisation of African Unity (OAU).

In July 1976, Barre's SRC disbanded and established the Somali Revolutionary Socialist Party (SRSP), a government based on scientific socialism and Islam. The SRSP was established to reconcile the state ideology with the state religion by adapting Marxist precepts. Emphasis was placed on principles of social progress, equality, and justice, and on self-sufficiency, public participation, popular control, the direct ownership of the means of production. While the SRSP encouraged limited private investment, the administration was communist.

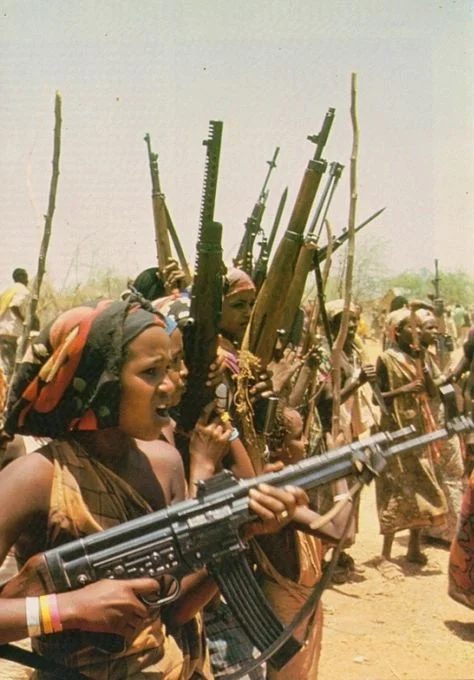
Somali Nationalist movement Western Somali Liberation Front (WSLF) militants during the Ogaden War in 1977.

In July 1977, the Ogaden War started after Barre's government used national liberation to justify the incorporation of the predominantly Somali Ogaden of Ethiopia into a Greater Somalia. Ogaden had rich agricultural lands, infrastructure, and strategically important areas. In the first week, Somali forces took southern and central Ogaden. For most of the war, the Somali army scored continuous victories over the Ethiopian army, pursuing till Sidamo. By September 1977, Somalia controlled 90% of the Ogaden and captured strategic cities such as Jijiga and pressured Dire Dawa, threatening the train route from the city to Djibouti. After the siege of Harar, a massive, unprecedented Soviet intervention of 20,000 Cuban forces and several thousand Soviet experts came to aid Ethiopia's communist Derg. By 1978, the Somali troops were ultimately pushed out of the Ogaden. This shift in support by the Soviets motivated the Barre government to seek allies elsewhere. It eventually settled on the Soviets' Cold War rival, the United States, which had been courting the Somali government for some time. Somalia's initial friendship with the Soviet Union and later partnership with the United States enabled it to build the largest army in Africa. A new constitution was promulgated in 1979, under which elections for a People's Assembly were held. In October 1980, the SRSP was disbanded, and the Supreme Revolutionary Council was reestablished.

The regime was weakened further in the 1980s as the Cold War drew to a close and Somalia's strategic importance was diminished. The government became increasingly authoritarian, and resistance movements, encouraged by Ethiopia, sprang up across the country, eventually leading to the Somali Civil War. Among the militia groups were the Somali Salvation Democratic Front (SSDF), United Somali Congress (USC), Somali National Movement (SNM) and the Somali Patriotic Movement (SPM), together with the non-violent political oppositions of the Somali Democratic Movement (SDM), the Somali Democratic Alliance (SDA) and the Somali Manifesto Group (SMG).

Approximate map of the current phase of the Somali Civil War (Updated March 2026) Somalia: Federal Government of Somalia, the African Union Support and Stabilization Mission in Somalia, the United States, and contested territory Government of Puntland Jubaland Dervish Force and the Raskamboni Movement Jihadist insurgent groups: al-Shabaab and allies Islamic State-backed Somalia Wilayah Somaliland: Self-declared state of Somaliland (For a more detailed map of the current military situation, see Template:Somali Civil War detailed map.)

As the moral authority of Barre's government was gradually eroded, many Somalis became disillusioned with life under military rule. By the mid-1980s, resistance movements supported by Ethiopia's communist Derg administration had sprung up across the country. Barre responded by ordering punitive measures against those he perceived as locally supporting the guerrillas, especially in the northern regions. The clampdown included bombing of cities, with the northwestern administrative centre of Hargeisa, a Somali National Movement (SNM) stronghold, among the targeted areas in 1988.

The clampdown initiated by Barre's government extended its reach beyond the initial bombings in the north to encompass various regions across the country. This reproduction of aggressive strategies aimed at stifling dissent and retaining authority over the populace was a hallmark of the government's repressive actions in the South. One of the most notable instances occurred in 1991, when Barre's regime initiated a ruthless aerial assault that led to the deaths of numerous individuals in the town of Beledwene, situated in southern Somalia.

Another notable instance of Barre's repressive policies occurred in the city of Baidoa, which earned the nickname 'the city of death' due to the events that unfolded there during the famine and civil war. Hundreds of thousands of individuals lost their lives as a consequence of governmental strategies specifically aimed at the Rahanweyn community residing in these areas.

During 1990, in the capital city of Mogadishu, the residents were prohibited from gathering publicly in groups greater than three or four. Fuel shortages, inflation, and currency devaluation impacted the economy. A thriving black market existed in the centre of the city as banks experienced shortages of local currency for exchange. Harsh exchange control regulations were introduced to prevent export of foreign currency. Although no travel restrictions were placed on foreigners, photographing many locations was banned. During daytime in Mogadishu, the appearance of any government military force was extremely rare. Alleged late-night operations by government authorities, however, included "disappearances" of individuals from their homes.

In 1991, the Barre administration was ousted by a coalition of clan-based opposition groups, backed by Ethiopia's then-ruling Derg regime and Libya. Following a meeting of the Somali National Movement and northern clans' elders, the northern former British portion of the country declared its independence as the Republic of Somaliland in May 1991. Although de facto independent and relatively stable compared to the tumultuous south, it was not recognised by any foreign government, until Israel recognised it in 2025.

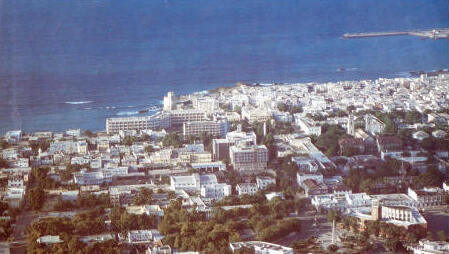
Prior to the civil war, Mogadishu was known as the "White pearl of the Indian Ocean".

Many of the opposition groups subsequently began competing for influence in the power vacuum that followed the ouster of Barre's regime. In the south, armed factions led by USC commanders General Mohamed Farah Aidid and Ali Mahdi Mohamed, in particular, clashed as each sought to exert authority over the capital.

In 1991, a multi-phased international conference on Somalia was held in neighbouring Djibouti. Owing to the legitimacy bestowed on Muhammad by the Djibouti conference, he was subsequently recognised by the international community as the new President of Somalia. He was not able to exert his authority beyond parts of the capital. Power was instead vied with other faction leaders in the southern half of Somalia and with autonomous sub-national entities in the north. The Djibouti conference was followed by two abortive agreements for national reconciliation and disarmament, which were signed by 15 political stakeholders: an agreement to hold an Informal Preparatory Meeting on National Reconciliation, and the 1993 Addis Ababa Agreement made at the Conference on National Reconciliation. In 1998, the state of Puntland was established under the leadership of Abdullahi Yusuf, head of the Somali Salvation Democratic Front.

In the early 1990s, due to the protracted lack of a permanent central authority, Somalia began to be characterised as a "failed state".

Following the collapse of the Somali Democratic Republic in early 1991, a new phenomenon emerged – the establishment of Sharia courts to impose law and order on the volatile neighborhoods of Mogadishu. These independent courts found their existence threatened by warlords, necessitating cooperation which resulted in their unification by 2000. The Islamic Courts Union (ICU) was a broad-based organization comprising various courts with diverse goals, from national political ambitions to local dispute resolution and propagation of Islam. Due to Islam's central role in Somali society, the initiative gained significant popularity and acceptance, along with substantial financial support from the Somali business community, as it originated from the grassroots level, built legitimacy through religious solidarity, addressed local security concerns, and demonstrated a commitment to restoring public order.

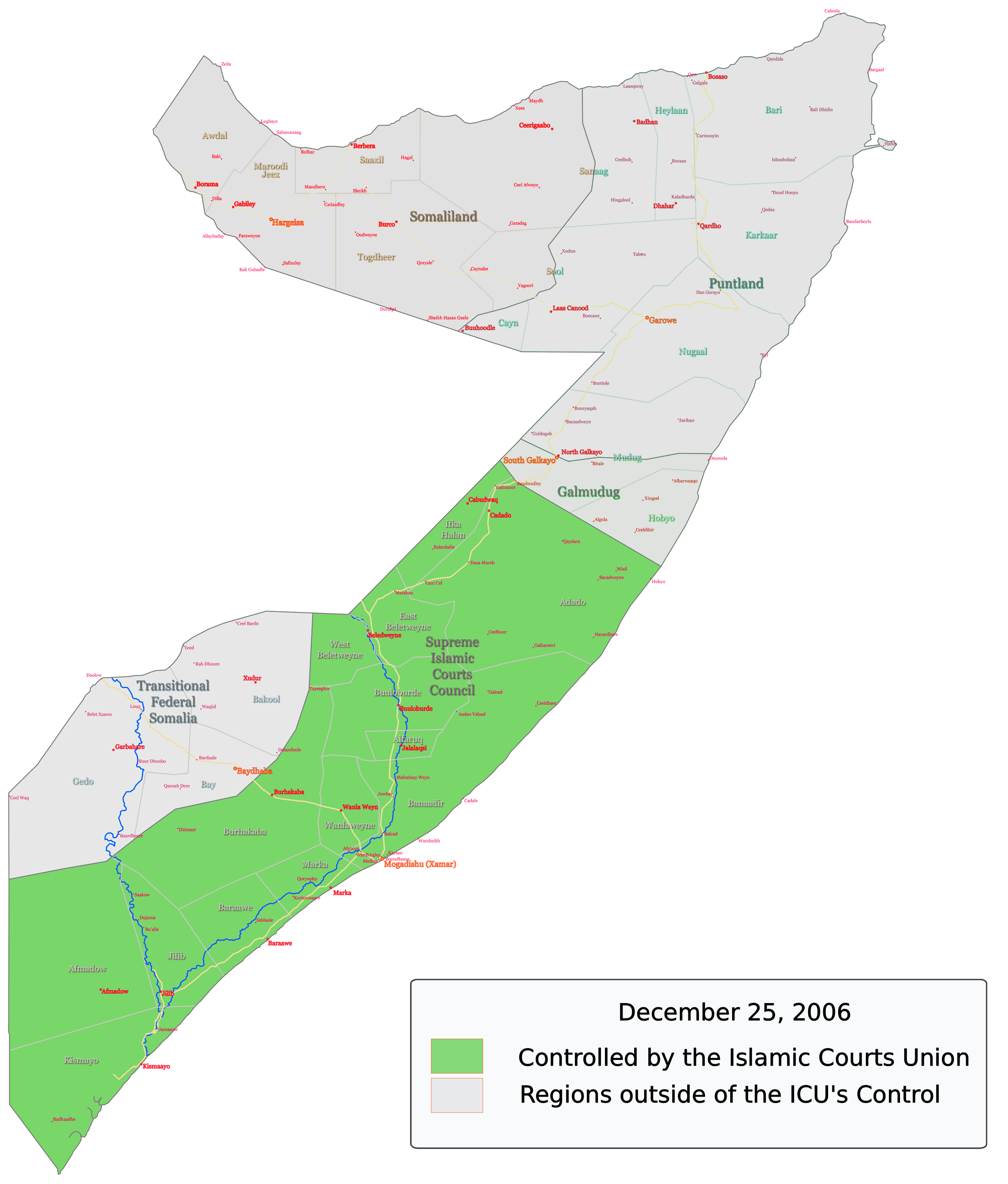
Map showing the Islamic Courts Union at the peak of its influence in Somalia, December 2006

The Transitional National Government (TNG) was established in April–May 2000 at the Somalia National Peace Conference (SNPC) held in Arta, Djibouti. Abdiqasim Salad Hassan was selected as the President of the nation's new Transitional National Government (TNG), an interim administration formed to guide Somalia to its third permanent republican government. The TNG's internal problems led to the replacement of the Prime Minister four times in three years, and the administrative body's reported bankruptcy in December 2003. Its mandate ended at the same time.

On 10 October 2004, legislators elected Abdullahi Yusuf Ahmed as the first President of the Transitional Federal Government (TFG), the Transitional National Government's successor. The TFG was the second interim administration aiming to restore national institutions to Somalia after the 1991 collapse of the Siad Barre regime and the ensuing civil war.

In 2006, the Islamic Courts Union (ICU) assumed control of much of the southern part of the country for 6 months and imposed Shari'a law. Top UN officials have referred to this brief period as a 'Golden era' in the history of Somali politics.

Al-Shabaab opposed the Ethiopian military's presence in Somalia and continued an insurgency against the TFG. Throughout 2007 and 2008, Al-Shabaab scored military victories, seizing control of key towns and ports in both central and southern Somalia. By January 2009, Al-Shabaab and other militias had forced the Ethiopian troops to retreat, leaving behind an under-equipped African Union peacekeeping force to assist the Transitional Federal Government's troops.

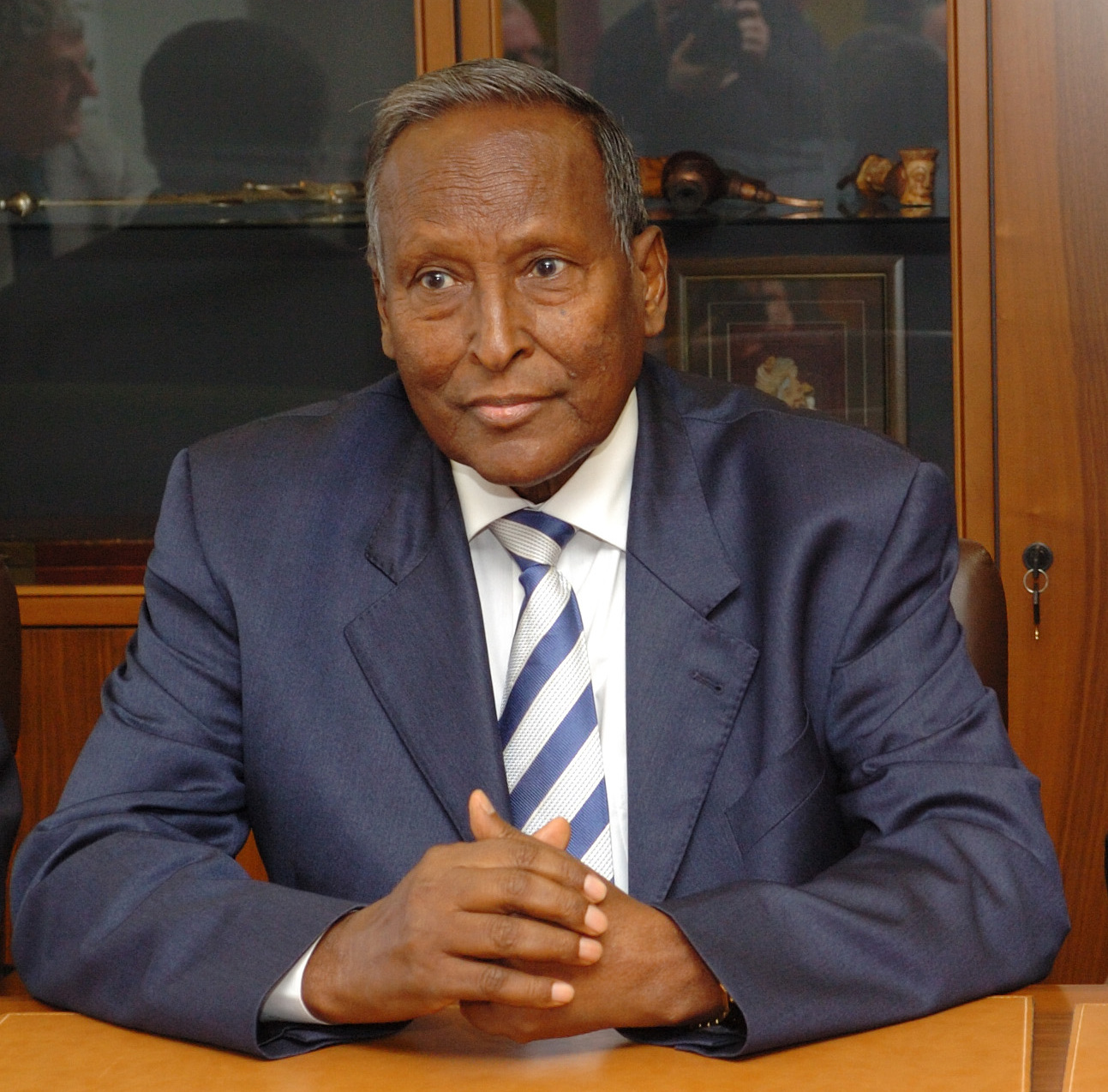
Abdullahi Yusuf Ahmed, president of the transitional government of Somalia

The Transitional Federal Government (TFG) was the internationally recognised government of Somalia until 20 August 2012, when its tenure officially ended. It was established as one of the Transitional Federal Institutions (TFIs) of government as defined in the Transitional Federal Charter (TFC) adopted in November 2004 by the Transitional Federal Parliament (TFP). The Transitional Federal Government officially comprised the executive branch of government, with the TFP serving as the legislative branch. The government was headed by the President of Somalia, to whom the cabinet reported through the Prime Minister. However, it was also used as a general term to refer to all three branches collectively.

Owing to a lack of funding and human resources, an arms embargo that made it difficult to reestablish a national security force, and general indifference on the part of the international community, Yusuf found himself obliged to deploy thousands of troops from Puntland to Mogadishu to sustain the battle against insurgent elements in the southern part of the country. Financial support for this effort was provided by the autonomous region's government. This left little revenue for Puntland's own security forces and civil service employees, leaving the territory vulnerable to piracy and terrorist attacks.

On 29 December 2008, Yusuf announced before a united parliament in Baidoa his resignation as President of Somalia. In his speech, which was broadcast on national radio, Yusuf expressed regret at failing to end the country's seventeen-year conflict as his government had been mandated to do. He also blamed the international community for their failure to support the government, and said that the speaker of parliament would succeed him in office per the Charter of the Transitional Federal Government.

Between 31 May and 9 June 2008, representatives of Somalia's federal government and the Alliance for the Re-liberation of Somalia (ARS) participated in peace talks in Djibouti brokered by the former United Nations Special Envoy to Somalia, Ahmedou Ould-Abdallah. The conference ended with a signed agreement calling for the withdrawal of Ethiopian troops in exchange for the cessation of armed confrontation. Parliament was subsequently expanded to 550 seats to accommodate ARS members, which then elected Sheikh Sharif Sheikh Ahmed, as president. With the help of a small team of African Union troops, the TFG began a counteroffensive in February 2009 to assume full control of the southern half of the country. To solidify its rule, the TFG formed an alliance with the Islamic Courts Union, other members of the Alliance for the Re-liberation of Somalia, and Ahlu Sunna Waljama'a, a moderate Sufi militia. Furthermore, Al-Shabaab and Hizbul Islam, the two main Islamist groups in opposition, began to fight amongst themselves in mid-2009. As a truce, in March 2009, the TFG announced that it would reimplement Shari'a as the nation's official judicial system. However, conflict continued in the southern and central parts of the country. Within months, the TFG had gone from holding about 70% of south-central Somalia's conflict zones, to losing control of over 80% of the disputed territory to the Islamist insurgents.

Three consecutive Somali presidents at the 2022 inauguration (left to right): 9th President Mohamed Abdullahi Farmajo (2017–2022), 8th President Hassan Sheikh Mohamud (2012–2017, 2022–present), and 7th President Sharif Sheikh Ahmed (2009–2012)

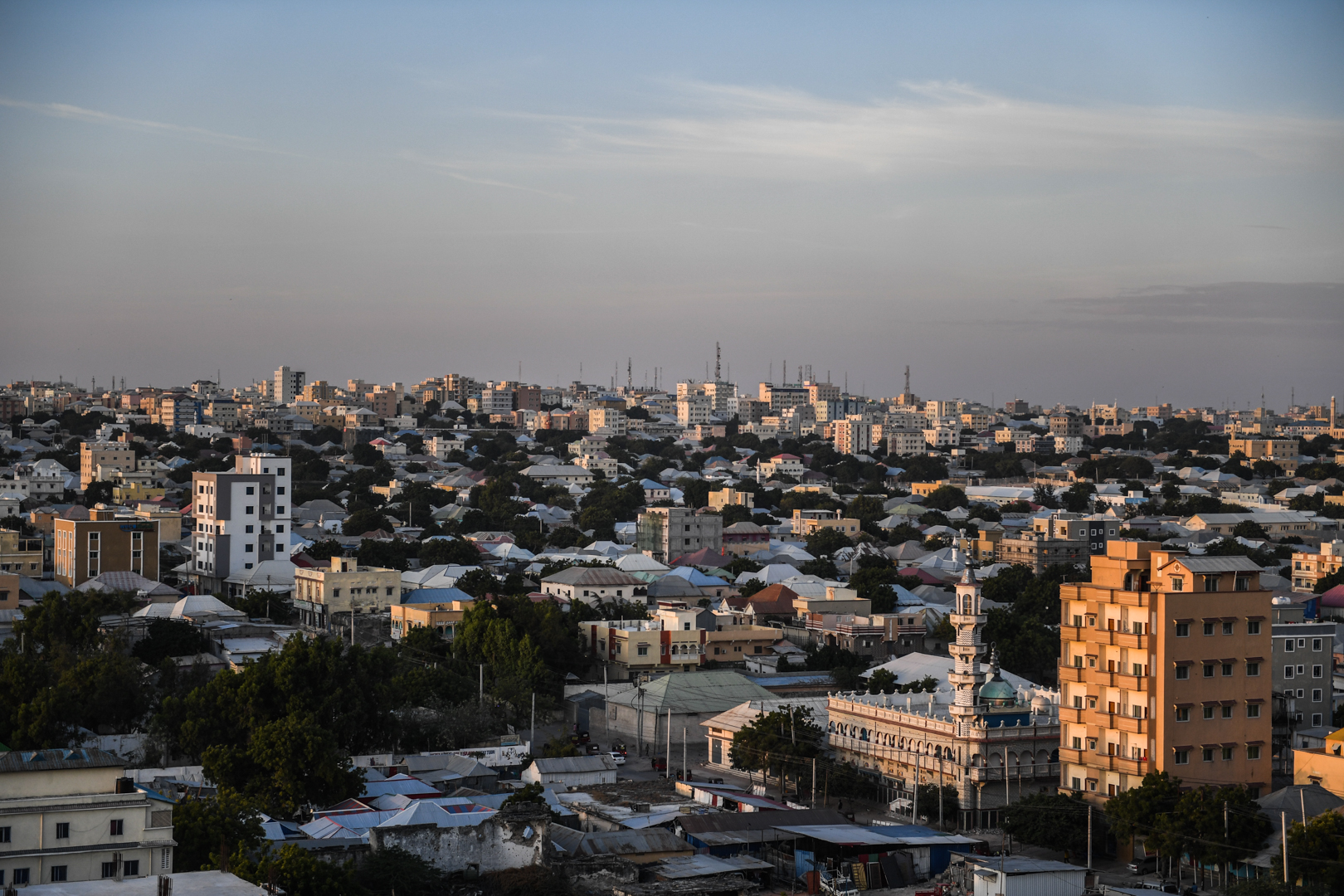
Mogadishu, the largest city in 2022

In October 2011, a coordinated operation, Operation Linda Nchi between the Somali and Kenyan militaries and multinational forces began against the Al-Shabaab in southern Somalia. By September 2012, Somali, Kenyan, and Raskamboni forces had managed to capture Al-Shabaab's last major stronghold, the southern port of Kismayo. In July 2012, three European Union operations were launched to engage with Somalia: EUTM Somalia, EU Naval Force Somalia Operation Atalanta off the Horn of Africa, and EUCAP Nestor.

As part of the official "Roadmap for the End of Transition", a political process that provided clear benchmarks leading toward the formation of permanent democratic institutions in Somalia, the Transitional Federal Government's interim mandate ended on 20 August 2012. The Federal Parliament of Somalia was concurrently inaugurated.

The Federal Government of Somalia, the first permanent central government in the country since the start of the civil war, was established in August 2012 with Hassan Sheikh Mohamud elected as president. In August 2014, the Somali government-led Operation Indian Ocean was launched against insurgent-held pockets in the countryside. The next election took place in 2017 with Mohamed Abdullahi Farmajo succeeding as president. Near the end of his presidency, disagreements over the upcoming election prompted Farmajo to sign a controversial 2 year extension that was eventually overturned.

In 2022, Hassan Sheikh Mohamud was re-elected for a second term. The beginning of his term coincided with the 2022 Central Somalia offensive that recaptured many settlements from Al-Shabaab. Some of these gains would eventually be reversed by the 2025 Shabelle offensive. On 15 May 2026, Mohamud's presidential term officially ended with no election agreement, resulting in a political dispute between state and opposition figures.

The 2021–2023 Somali drought was Somalia's most severe drought in 40 years, and affected 7.8 million people.

On 30 March 2024, a series of constitutional amendments approved by the Federal Government of Somalia led to disagreements with some federal member states, triggering a political crisis. Three out of six member states withdrew their recognition of the federal government's authority and local clashes erupted in Jubaland and South West State.

== Geography ==
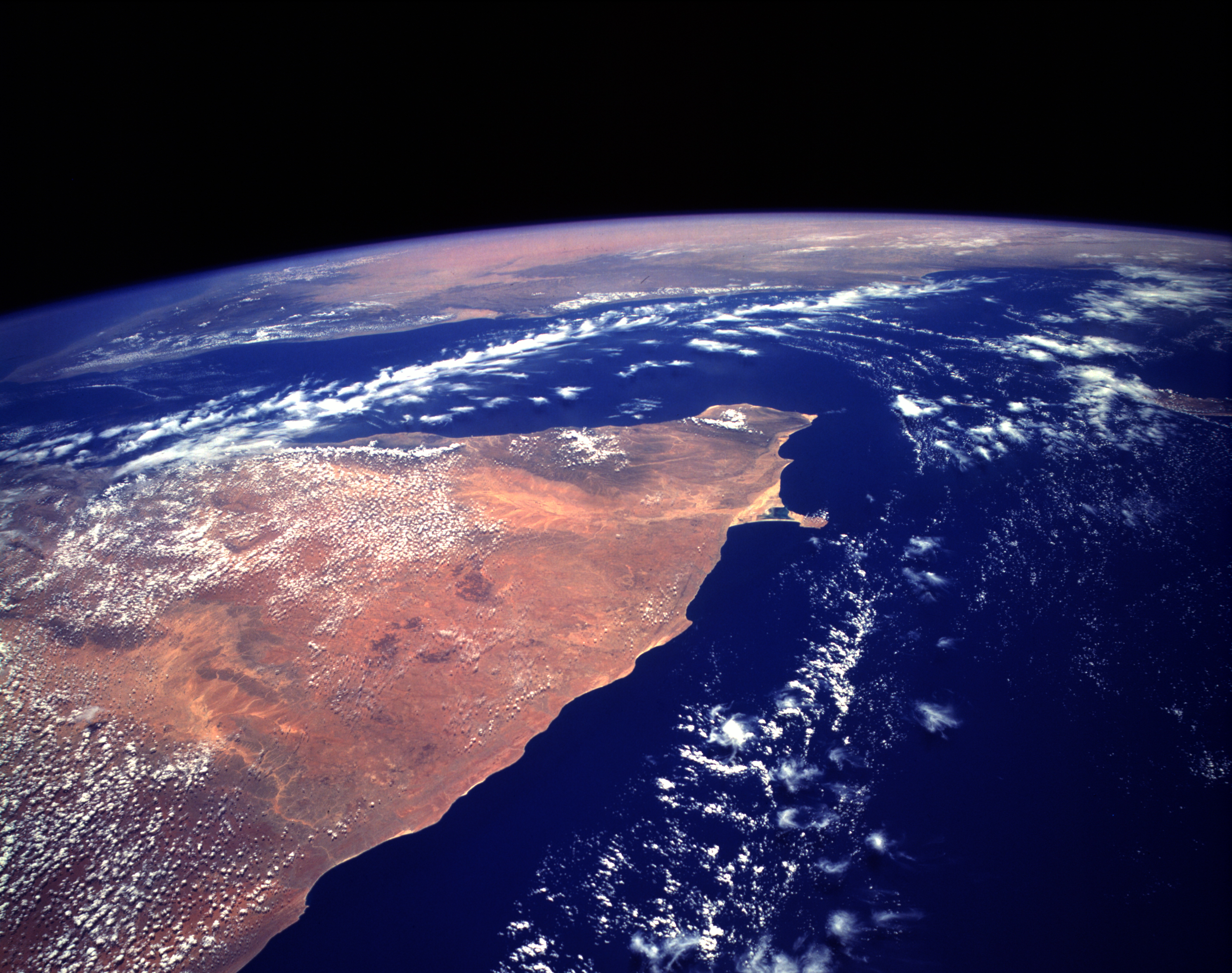
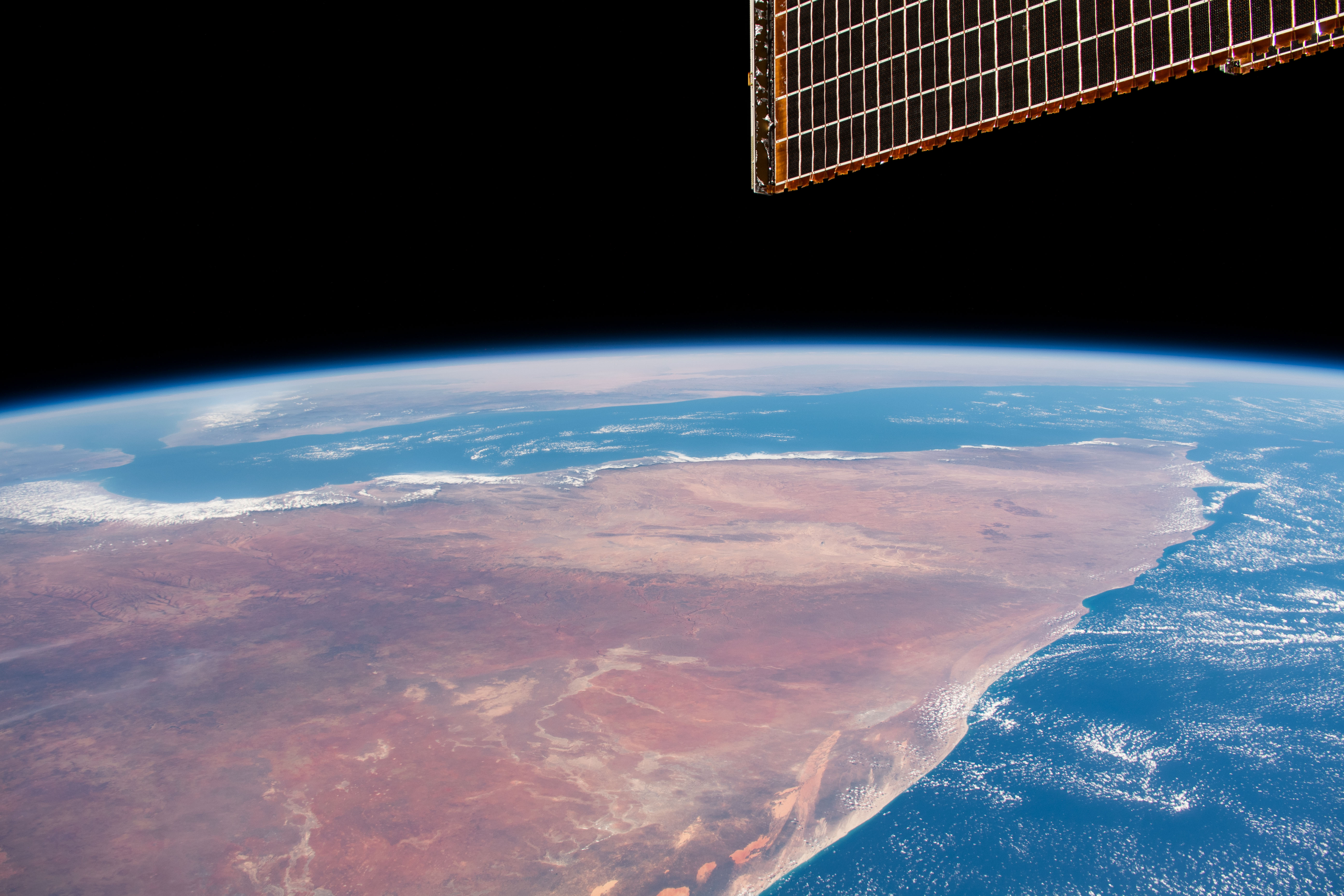
Views of the Somali Peninsula from the Space Shuttle Columbia in 1993 (top) and the International Space Station in 2020 (bottom)

Somalia borders Djibouti to the northwest, Ethiopia to the west, the Gulf of Aden to the north, the Somali Sea and Guardafui Channel to the east, and Kenya to the southwest. With a land area of 637,657 square kilometres, Somalia's terrain consists mainly of plateaus, plains and highlands. Its coastline is more than 3,333 kilometres in length, the longest of mainland Africa. Its maritime claims include territorial waters of 200 nautical miles (370 km; 230 mi). Somalia has several islands and archipelagos on its coast, including the Bajuni Islands and the Saad ad-Din Archipelago.

Strategically located at the mouth of the Bab el Mandeb gateway to the Red Sea and the Suez Canal, the country occupies the tip of a region that, due to its resemblance on the map to a rhinoceros' horn, is commonly referred to as the Horn of Africa.

In the far north, the rugged east–west ranges of the Ogo Mountains lie at varying distances from the Gulf of Aden coast. Hot conditions prevail year-round, along with periodic monsoon winds and irregular rainfall. Geology suggests the presence of valuable mineral deposits. Somalia is separated from Seychelles by the Somali Sea and is separated from Socotra by the Guardafui Channel.

Somalia contains seven terrestrial ecoregions: Ethiopian montane forests, Northern Zanzibar–Inhambane coastal forest mosaic, Somali Acacia–Commiphora bushlands and thickets, Ethiopian xeric grasslands and shrublands, Hobyo grasslands and shrublands, Somali montane xeric woodlands, and East African mangroves.

In the north, a scrub-covered, semi-desert plain referred as the Guban lies parallel to the Gulf of Aden littoral. With a width of twelve kilometres in the west to as little as two kilometres in the east, the plain is bisected by watercourses that are essentially beds of dry sand except during the rainy seasons. When the rains arrive, the Guban's low bushes and grass clumps transform into lush vegetation. This coastal strip is part of the Ethiopian xeric grasslands and shrublands ecoregion.

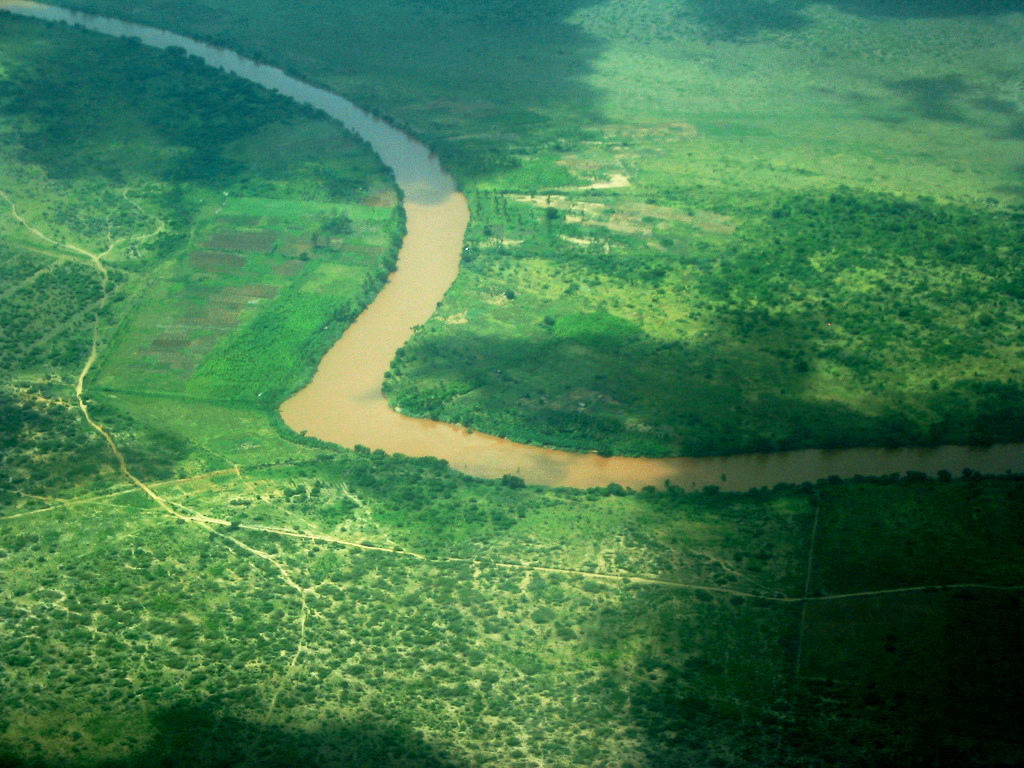
Aerial view of the Jubba River meandering through the fertile landscape downstream from Jamame

Cal Madow is a mountain range in the northeastern part of the country. Extending from several kilometres west of the city of Bosaso to the northwest of Erigavo, it features Somalia's highest peak, Shimbiris, which sits at an elevation of about 2,416 metres (7,927 ft). The rugged east–west ranges of the Karkaar Mountains also lie to the interior of the Gulf of Aden littoral. In the central regions, the country's northern mountain ranges give way to shallow plateaus and typically dry watercourses that are referred to locally as the Ogo. The Ogo's western plateau, in turn, gradually merges into the Haud, an important grazing area for livestock.

Somalia has only two permanent rivers, the Jubba and Shabele, both of which begin in the Ethiopian Highlands. These rivers flow southwards, with the Jubba River entering the Indian Ocean at Kismayo. The Shabele River used to enter the sea near Merca, but now reaches a point just southwest of Mogadishu. After that, it consists of swamps and dry reaches before finally disappearing in the desert terrain east of Jilib, near the Jubba River.

=== Environment ===
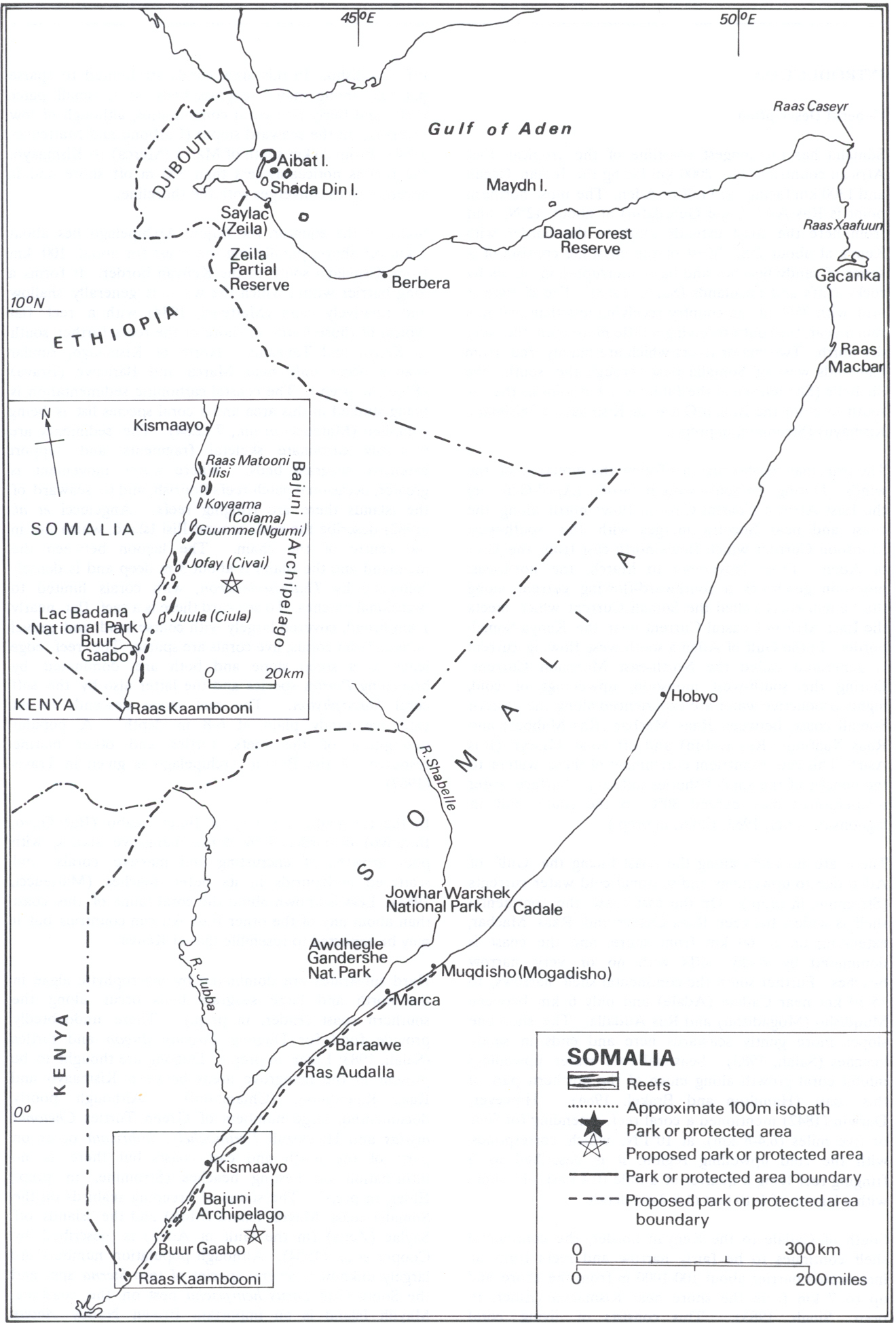
Somalia's coral reefs, ecological parks and protected areas

Somalia is a semi-arid country with about 1.6% arable land. The first local environmental organisations were Ecoterra Somalia and the Somali Ecological Society, which promoted ecological awareness and mobilised environmental programs governmentally and through grassroots efforts. From 1971 onward, a massive tree-planting campaign on a nationwide scale was introduced by the communist government to halt the advance of wind-driven sand dunes, which threatened to engulf towns, roads and farm land. By 1988, 265 hectares of a projected 336 hectares had been treated, with 39 range reserve sites and 36 forestry plantation sites established. In 1986, the Wildlife Rescue, Research and Monitoring Centre was established by Ecoterra International, with the goal of raising ecological awareness. This effort led in 1989 to a decision by the Somali government to adhere to the Convention on International Trade in Endangered Species of Wild Fauna and Flora, which banned the trade of elephant ivory.

Following the tsunami of December 2004, it was alleged that Somalia's shoreline was used to dump toxic waste. The waves after the tsunami stirred up nuclear and toxic waste that was possibly dumped illegally by foreign firms.

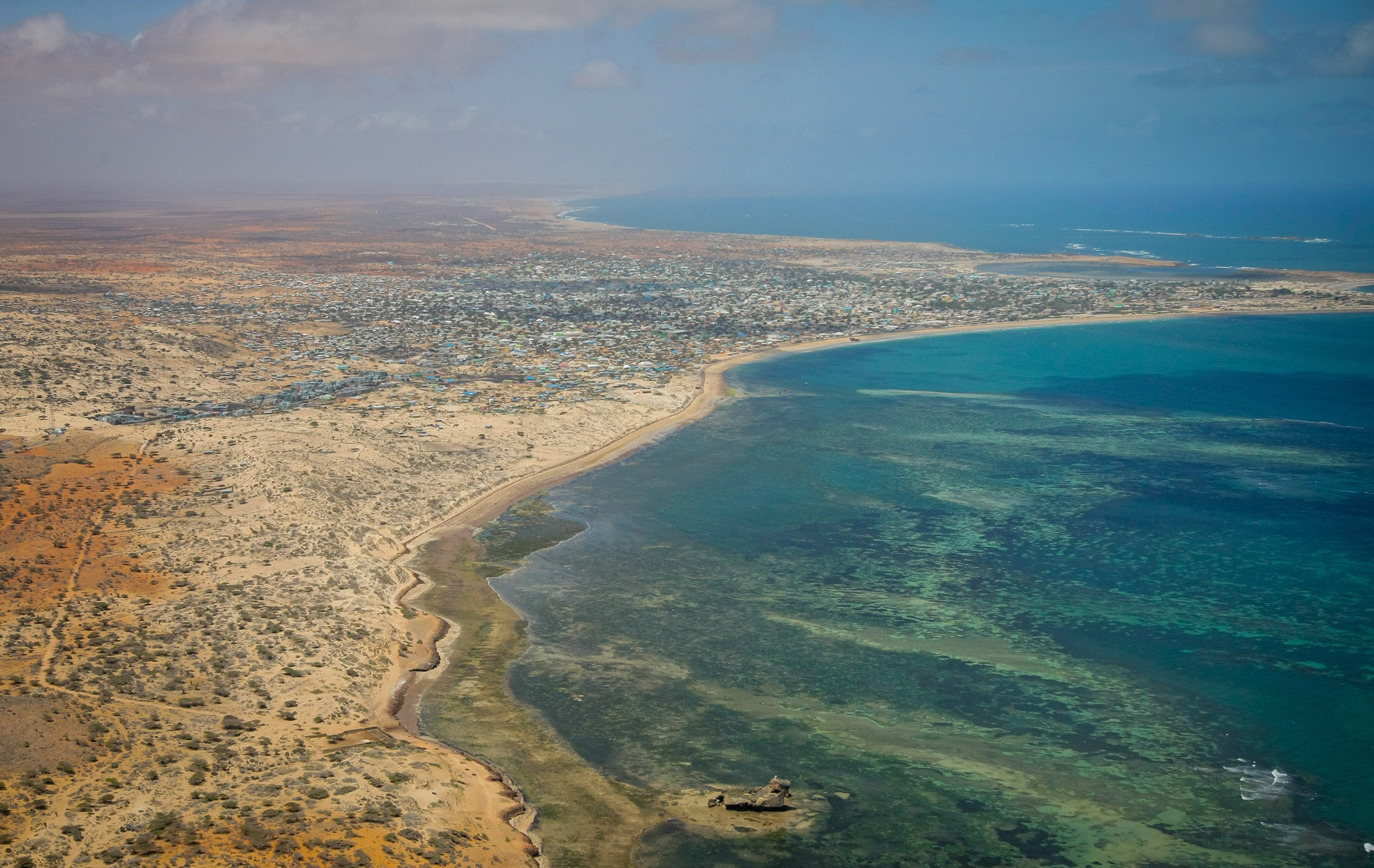
The coast south of Mogadishu

Following this, the European Green Party presented the European Parliament copies of contracts signed by two European companies and representatives of the President of Somalia, to accept 10 million tonnes of toxic waste for $80 million.

According to reports by the United Nations Environment Programme (UNEP), the waste resulted in abnormally high cases of respiratory infections, mouth ulcers, mouth bleeding, abdominal haemorrhages and unusual skin infections among the inhabitants of and around the northeastern towns of Hobyo and Benadir. These diseases were consistent with radiation sickness. UNEP adds that the situation posed a very serious environmental hazard to Somalia and the broader eastern Africa sub-region.

=== Climate ===
Köppen–Geiger climate classification map at 1-km resolution for Somalia 1991–2020

Owing to Somalia's proximity to the equator, there is little seasonal variation in climate. Hot conditions prevail year-round, with periodic monsoon winds and irregular rainfall. Mean daily maximum temperatures range from 30–40 °C (86–104 °F), except at higher elevations along the eastern seaboard, because of a cold offshore current. In Mogadishu, average afternoon highs range from 28–32 °C (82–90 °F) in April. Some of the highest global mean annual temperatures were recorded in the country; Berbera on the northwestern coast has an average afternoon high of more than 38 °C (100 °F) from June through September. Nationally, mean daily minimums usually vary from about 15–30 °C (59–86 °F). The greatest range in climate occurs in northern Somalia, where temperatures sometimes surpass 45 °C (113 °F) in July on the littoral plains and drop below the freezing point during December in the highlands. In this region, relative humidity ranges from about 40% in the mid-afternoon to 85% at night, changing according to the season. Unlike the climates of most other countries at this latitude, conditions in Somalia range from arid in the northeastern and central regions to semiarid in the northwest and south. In the northeast, annual rainfall is less than 100 mm (4 in); in the central plateaus, it is about 200 to 300 mm (8 to 12 in). The northwestern and southwestern parts of the nation, receive considerably more rain, with an average of 510 to 610 mm (20 to 24 in) per year. Although the coastal regions are hot and humid throughout the year, the hinterland is typically dry and hot.

There are four main seasons dictated by shifts in wind patterns. Pastoral and agricultural life revolve around these. From December to March is the Jilal, the harshest dry season of the year. The main rainy season, the Gu, lasts from April to June. This period is characterised by the southwest monsoons, which rejuvenate pasture land, especially the central plateau, and briefly transform desert into lush vegetation. From July to September is the second dry season, the Xagaa. The Dayr, which is the shortest rainy season, lasts from October to December. The tangambili periods that intervene between the monsoons (October–November and March–May) are hot and humid.

=== Biodiversity ===
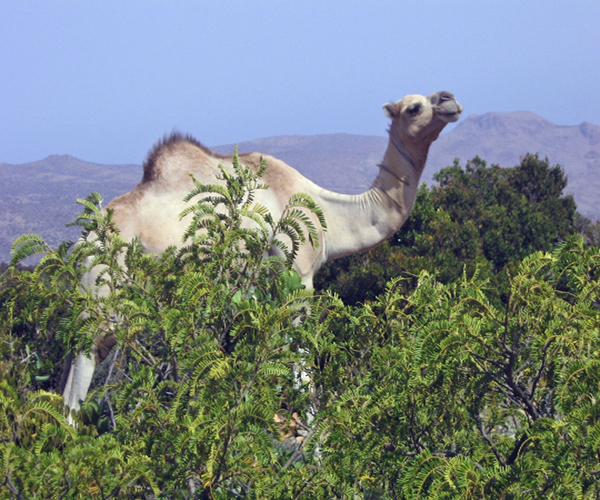
A camel in the northern mountains

Somalia contains a variety of mammals due to its geographical and climatic diversity. Wildlife still occurring includes cheetah, lion, reticulated giraffe, baboon, serval, elephant, bushpig, gazelle, ibex, kudu, dik-dik, oribi, Somali wild ass, reedbuck, Grévy's zebra, elephant shrew, rock hyrax, golden mole, and antelope. It also has a large population of the dromedary camel.

Somalia is home to around 727 species of birds. Of these, eight are endemic, one has been introduced by humans, and one is rare or accidental. Fourteen species are globally threatened. Birds species found exclusively in the country include the Somali pigeon, lesser hoopoe-lark, Somali lark, Russet lark, Obbia lark, Somali thrush, Somali grosbeak, and Warsangli linnet.

Somalia's territorial waters are prime fishing grounds for highly migratory marine species, such as tuna. A narrow but productive continental shelf contains several demersal fish and crustacean species. Fish species found exclusively in the nation include the Somali hawkfish Cirrhitichthys randalli (in the hawkfish family Cirrhitidae), Symphurus fuscus (in the tonguefish family Cynoglossidae), Parapercis simulata (in the sandperch family Pinguipedidae), Cociella somaliensis (in the flathead family Platycephalidae), and blackback dottyback Pseudochromis punctatus (in the dottyback family Pseudochromidae).

There are roughly 235 species of reptiles. Of these, almost half live in the northern areas. Reptiles endemic to Somalia include the Hughes' carpet viper, Somali garter snake, Messana's racer, Scortecci's diadem snake, Somali sand boa, angled worm lizard, Macfadyen's mastigure, Somali agama, Granchi's leaf-toed gecko, Somali semaphore gecko, Haacke-Greer's skink, an unnamed colubrid snake (Aprosdoketophis andreonei), and a wall lizard from either the Mesalina or Eremias genera.

== Government and politics ==
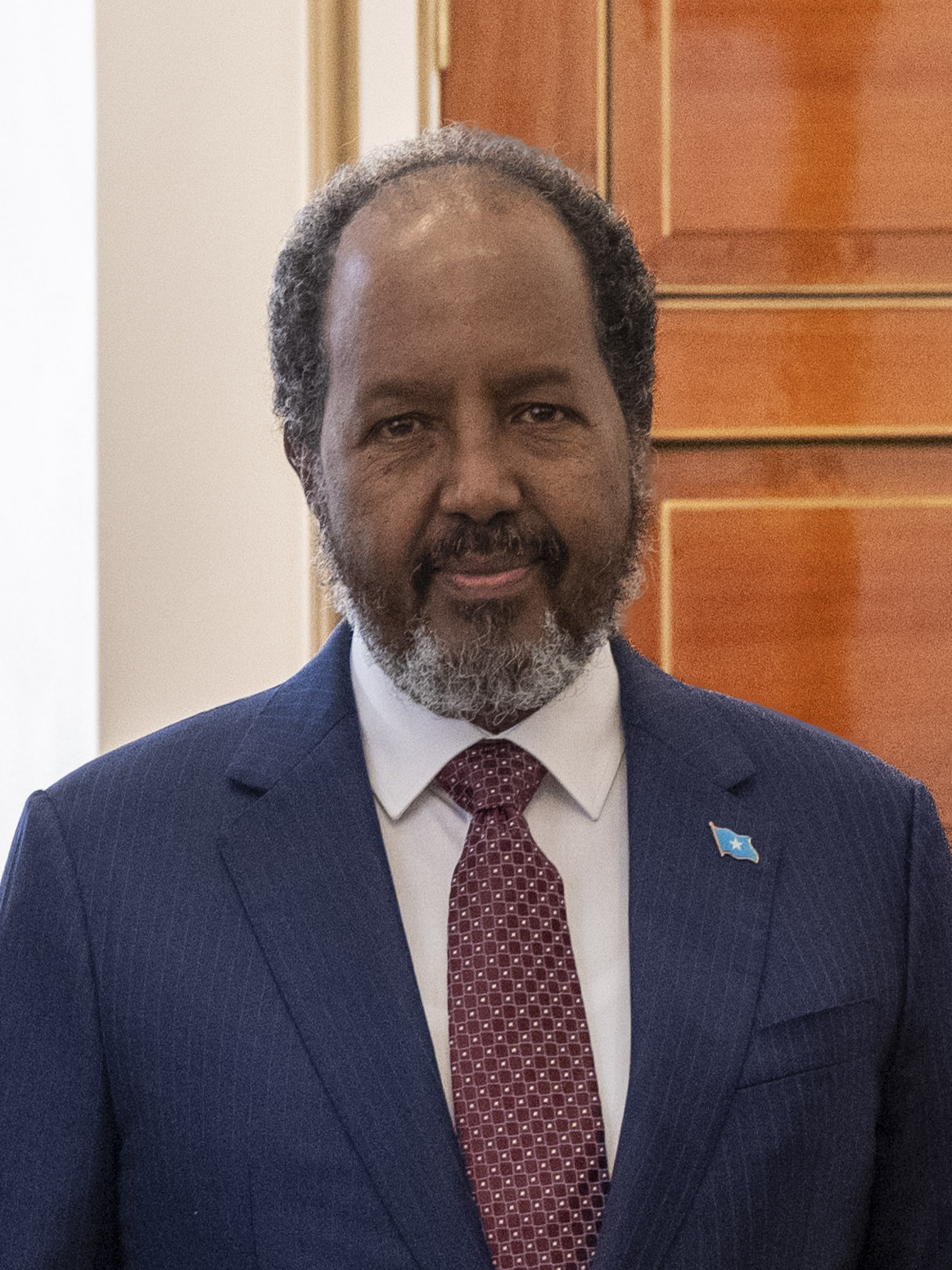
Hassan Sheikh Mohamud
President (disputed)

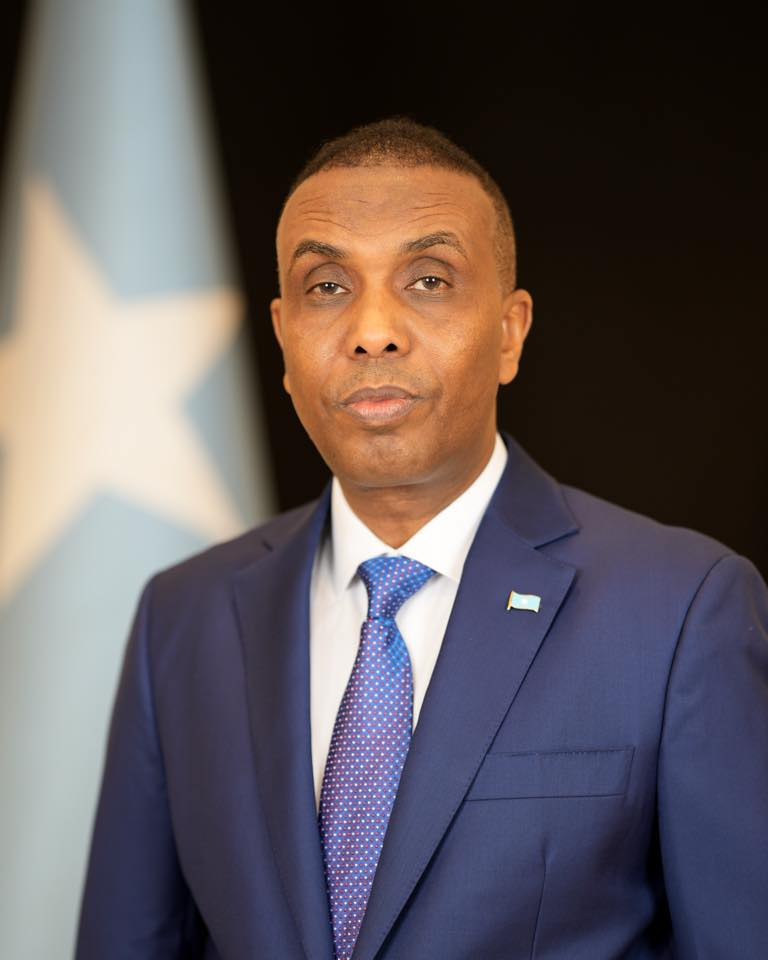
Hamza Abdi Barre
Prime Minister

Somalia is a federal parliamentary representative democratic republic. The president of Somalia is the head of state and commander-in-chief of the Somali Armed Forces and selects the prime minister to lead as head of government.

The Federal Parliament of Somalia is the national parliament of Somalia. The bicameral National Legislature consists of the House of the People (lower house) and the Senate (upper house), whose members are elected to serve four-year terms. The parliament elects the President, Speaker of Parliament and Deputy Speakers. It also has the authority to pass and veto laws.

The Judiciary of Somalia is defined by the Provisional Constitution of the Federal Republic of Somalia. Adopted on 1 August 2012 by a National Constitutional Assembly in Mogadishu, the document was formulated by a committee of specialists chaired by attorney and Speaker of the Federal Parliament, Mohamed Osman Jawari. It provides the legal foundation for the existence of the Federal Republic and source of legal authority.

Federal Parliament of Somalia

Composition of the Senate of Somalia

Structure of the Lower House (House of the People) under the 4.5 System

The national court structure is organised into three tiers: the Constitutional Court, Federal Government level courts and State level courts. A nine-member Judicial Service Commission appoints any Federal tier member of the judiciary. It also selects and presents potential Constitutional Court judges to the House of the People of the Federal Parliament for approval. If endorsed, the President appoints the candidate as a judge of the Constitutional Court. The five-member Constitutional Court adjudicates issues pertaining to the constitution, in addition to various Federal and sub-national matters.

Somali law draws from a mixture of three different systems: civil law, Islamic law and customary law.

According to 2023 V-Dem Democracy indices Somalia is the 5th least democratic country in Africa.

After the collapse of Somalia in 1991, there were no relations or any contact between the Somaliland government, which declared itself a country, and the government of Somalia.

=== Transitional Federal Government ===
The Transitional Federal Government sought to reestablish its authority, and, with the assistance of Ethiopian troops, African Union peacekeepers and air support by the United States, drove out the ICU and solidified its rule. On 8 January 2007, TFG President Abdullahi Yusuf Ahmed entered Mogadishu with the Ethiopian military support for the first time since being elected to office. The government then relocated to Villa Somalia in the capital from its interim location in Baidoa. This marked the first time since the fall of the Siad Barre regime in 1991 that the federal government controlled most of the country.

=== Administrative divisions ===
Somalia is officially divided into seven states and eighteen regions (gobollada, singular gobol), which in turn are subdivided into districts. The regions are:

Regions of Somalia with coloured states

Somaliland

Awdal
Woqooyi Galbeed**
Togdheer*
Sanaag*
Sool*
(Khatumo) North East

Togdheer*
Sanaag*
Sool*
Puntland

Bari
Nugaal
Mudug***
Galmudug

Galguduud
Mudug***
Hirshabelle

Hiran
Middle Shabelle
(South West State of Somalia) South West

Bakool
Bay
Lower Shabelle
Jubaland

Gedo
Middle Juba
Lower Juba
Banaadir

Mogadishu

* Disputed

** Separated to Maroodi Jeex and Sahil by Somaliland

*** Shared by Puntland and Galmudug

Northern Somalia is now de facto divided up among the autonomous regions of Puntland (which considers itself an autonomous state), Somaliland (a self-declared, partially-recognised state) and newly established North East State of Somalia. In central Somalia, Galmudug is another regional entity that emerged just south of Puntland. Jubaland in the far south is a fourth autonomous region within the federation. In 2014, a new South West State was likewise established. In April 2015, a formation conference was also launched for a new Hirshabelle State.

The Federal Parliament was tasked in 2012 with selecting the ultimate number and boundaries of the autonomous regional states (officially Federal Member States) within the Federal Republic of Somalia.

=== Foreign relations ===
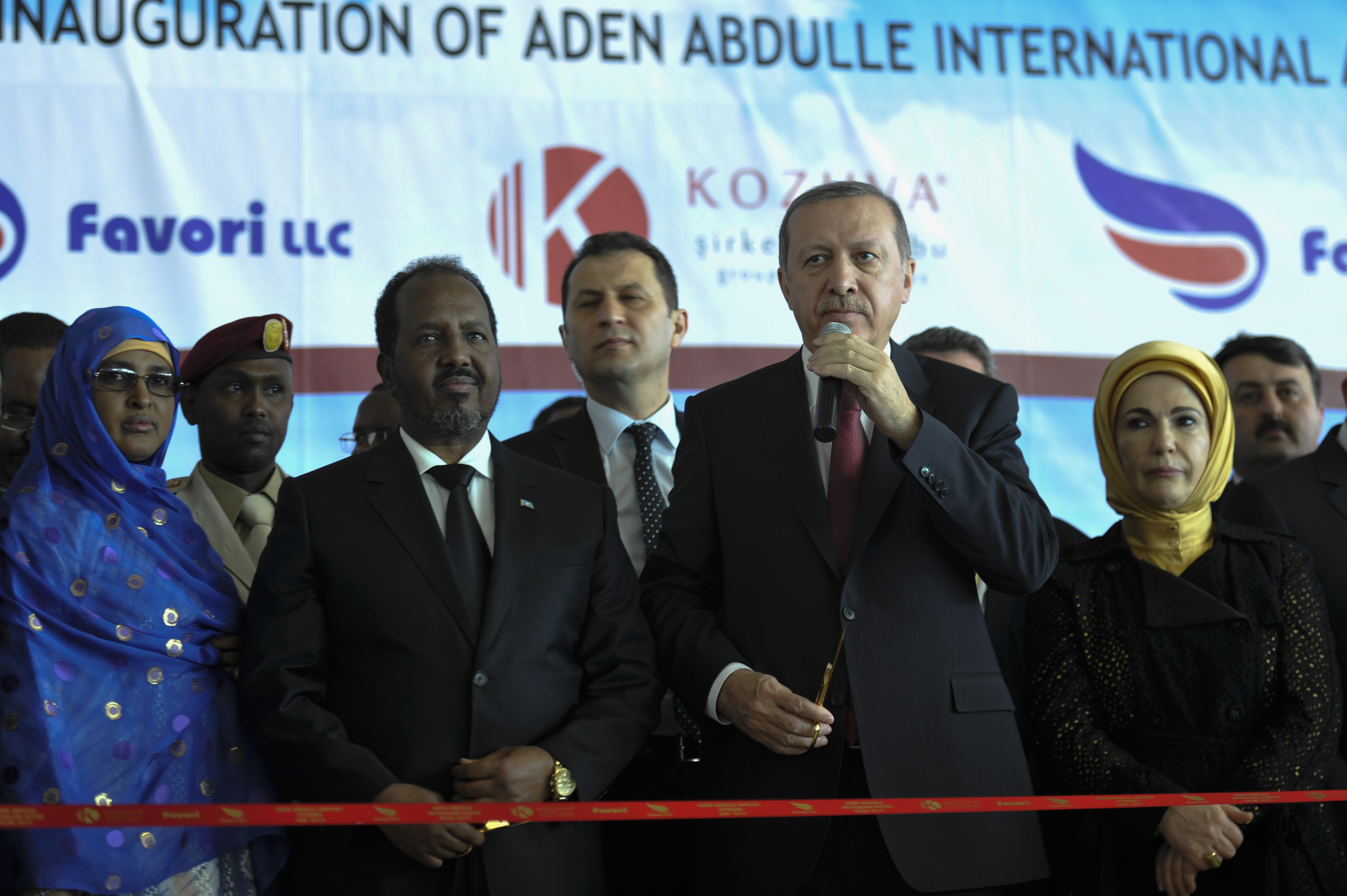
President of Somalia Hassan Sheikh Mohamud with Turkish President Recep Tayyip Erdogan opening the new terminal of Aden Abdulle International Airport in Mogadishu, Somalia. (25 January 2015)

Somalia's foreign relations are handled by the President as the head of state, the Prime Minister as the head of government, and the federal Ministry of Foreign Affairs.

According to Article 54 of the national constitution, the allocation of powers and resources between the Federal Government and the Federal Republic of Somalia's constituent Federal Member States shall be negotiated and agreed upon by the Federal Government and the Federal Member States, except in matters pertaining to foreign affairs, national defence, citizenship and immigration, and monetary policy. Article 53 also stipulates that the Federal Government shall consult the Federal Member States on major issues related to international agreements, including negotiations vis-a-vis foreign trade, finance and treaties. The Federal Government maintains bilateral relations with a number of other central governments in the international community. Among these are Djibouti, Ethiopia, Egypt, the United Arab Emirates, Yemen, Turkey, Italy, the United Kingdom, Denmark, France, the United States, the People's Republic of China, Japan, Russian Federation and South Korea.

Additionally, Somalia has several diplomatic missions abroad. There are likewise various foreign embassies and consulates based in the capital Mogadishu and elsewhere in the country.

Somalia is also a member of many international organisations, such as the United Nations, African Union and Arab League. It was a founding member of the Organisation of Islamic Cooperation in 1969. Other memberships include the African Development Bank, East African Community, Group of 77, Intergovernmental Authority on Development, International Bank for Reconstruction and Development, International Civil Aviation Organization, International Development Association, International Finance Corporation, Non-Aligned Movement, World Federation of Trade Unions and World Meteorological Organization.

=== Military ===
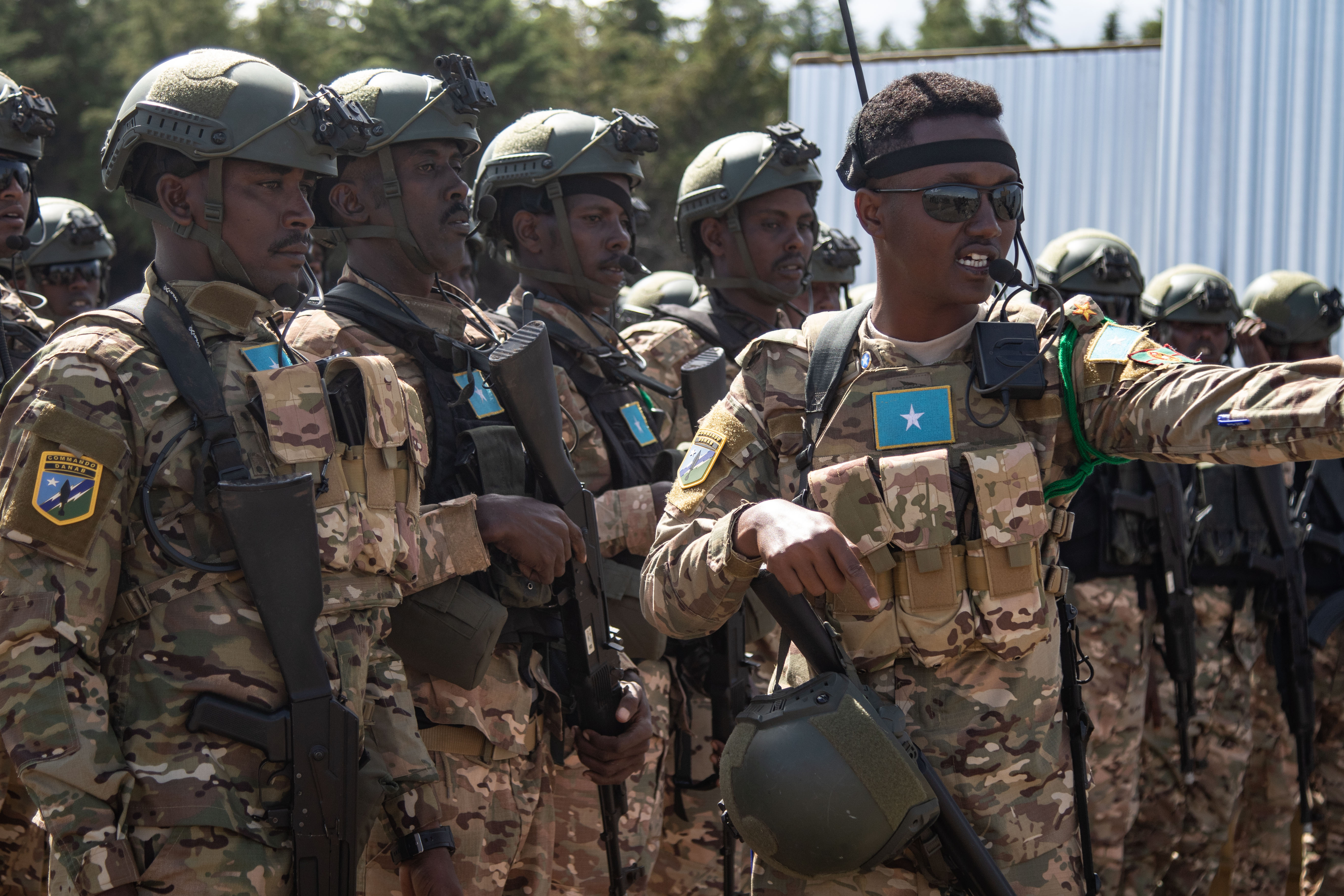
Somali National Army (SNA) soldiers conducting operations training in 2024

The Somali Armed Forces (SAF) are the military forces of the Federal Republic of Somalia. Headed by the President as Commander in Chief, they are constitutionally mandated to ensure the nation's sovereignty, independence and territorial integrity.

The SAF was initially made up of the Army, Navy, Air Force, Police Force and the National Security Service. In the post-independence period, it grew to become among the larger militaries on the continent. The subsequent outbreak of the civil war in 1991 led to the disbandment of the Somali National Army.

In 2004, the gradual process of reconstituting the military was put in motion with the establishment of the Transitional Federal Government (TFG). The Somali Armed Forces are now overseen by the Ministry of Defence of the Federal Government of Somalia, formed in mid-2012. In January 2013, the Somali federal government also reopened the national intelligence service in Mogadishu, renaming the agency the National Intelligence and Security Agency (NISA). The Somaliland and Puntland regional governments maintain their own security and police forces.

=== Human rights ===
Human rights are guaranteed in the Federal Constitution. They fall under the Ministry of Human Rights established in August 2013. The central authorities concurrently inaugurated a National Human Rights Day, endorsed an official Human Rights Roadmap, and completed Somalia's first National Gender Policy.

However, both male and female same-sex sexual activity are punishable by death within Somalia. On 3 October 2020, a UN human rights investigator raised concerns over Somali government's backtracking of human rights commitments.

== Economy ==
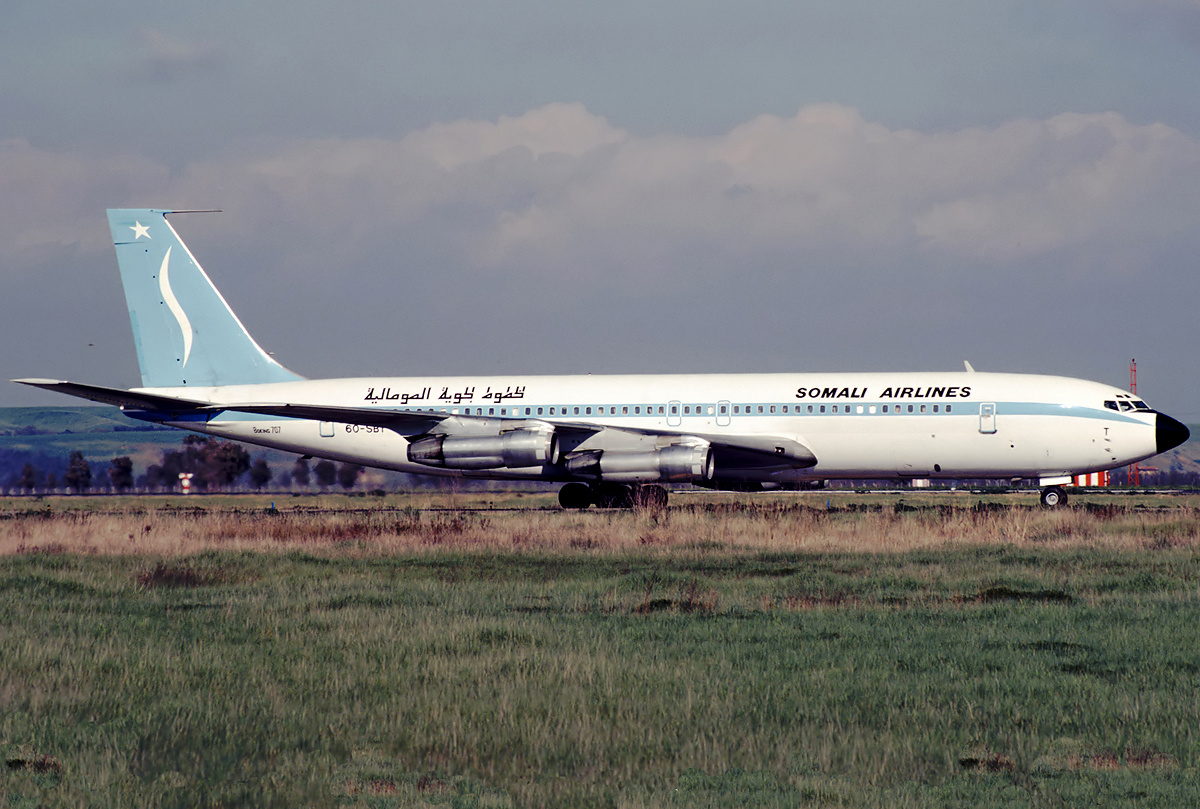
Somali Airlines, the government-owned national airline, Boeing 707-320B at Fiumicino Airport (1989).

According to the CIA and the Central Bank of Somalia, with ongoing civil unrest, the Somali economy is primarily limited to livestock and remittance/money transfers from Somalis living in more economically advanced countries, and local telecommunications. Owing to a dearth of formal government statistics and ongoing decades-long iterations of civil war, it is difficult to gauge the size or growth of the economy. For 1994, the CIA estimated the GDP at US$3.3 billion. In 2001, it was estimated to be US$4.1 billion. By 2009, the CIA estimated that the GDP had grown to US$5.731 billion, with a projected real growth rate of 2.6%. According to a 2007 British Chambers of Commerce report, during a period of relatively less internal warfare, the private sector had also grown, particularly in the service sector. Unlike the pre-civil war period, when most services and the industrial sector were government-run, the 2007 report noted substantial, albeit unmeasured, private investment in commercial activities; this has been largely financed by the Somali diaspora, and included trade and marketing, money transfer services, transportation, communications, fishery equipment, airlines, telecommunications, education, health, construction and hotels. In 2007, Libertarian economist Peter Leeson attributed this increased economic activity to the Somali customary law (referred to as Xeer), which he suggests provides a stable environment to conduct business in.

According to the Central Bank of Somalia, the country's GDP per capita as of 2012 was US$226, a slight reduction in real terms from 1990. About 43% of the population lives on less than 1 US dollar a day, with around 24% of those found in urban areas and 54% living in rural areas. The Ministry of Finance of Somalia projected the 2025 GDP to be $13.3 billion.

Somalia's economy consists of both traditional and modern production, with a gradual shift toward modern industrial techniques. Somalia has the largest population of camels in the world. According to the Central Bank of Somalia, about 80% of the population are nomadic or semi-nomadic pastoralists, who keep goats, sheep, camels and cattle. The nomads also gather resins and gums to supplement their income.

=== Agriculture ===
Agriculture is the most important economic sector of Somalia. It accounts for about 65% of the GDP and employs 65% of the workforce. Livestock contributes about 40% to GDP and more than 50% of export earnings. Other principal exports include fish, charcoal and bananas; sugar, sorghum and corn are products for the domestic market. According to the Central Bank of Somalia, imports of goods total about US$460 million per year, surpassing aggregate imports prior to the start of the civil war in 1991. Exports, which total about US$270 million annually, have also surpassed pre-war aggregate export levels. Somalia has a trade deficit of about US$190 million per year, but this is exceeded by remittances sent by Somalis in the diaspora, estimated to be about US$1 billion.

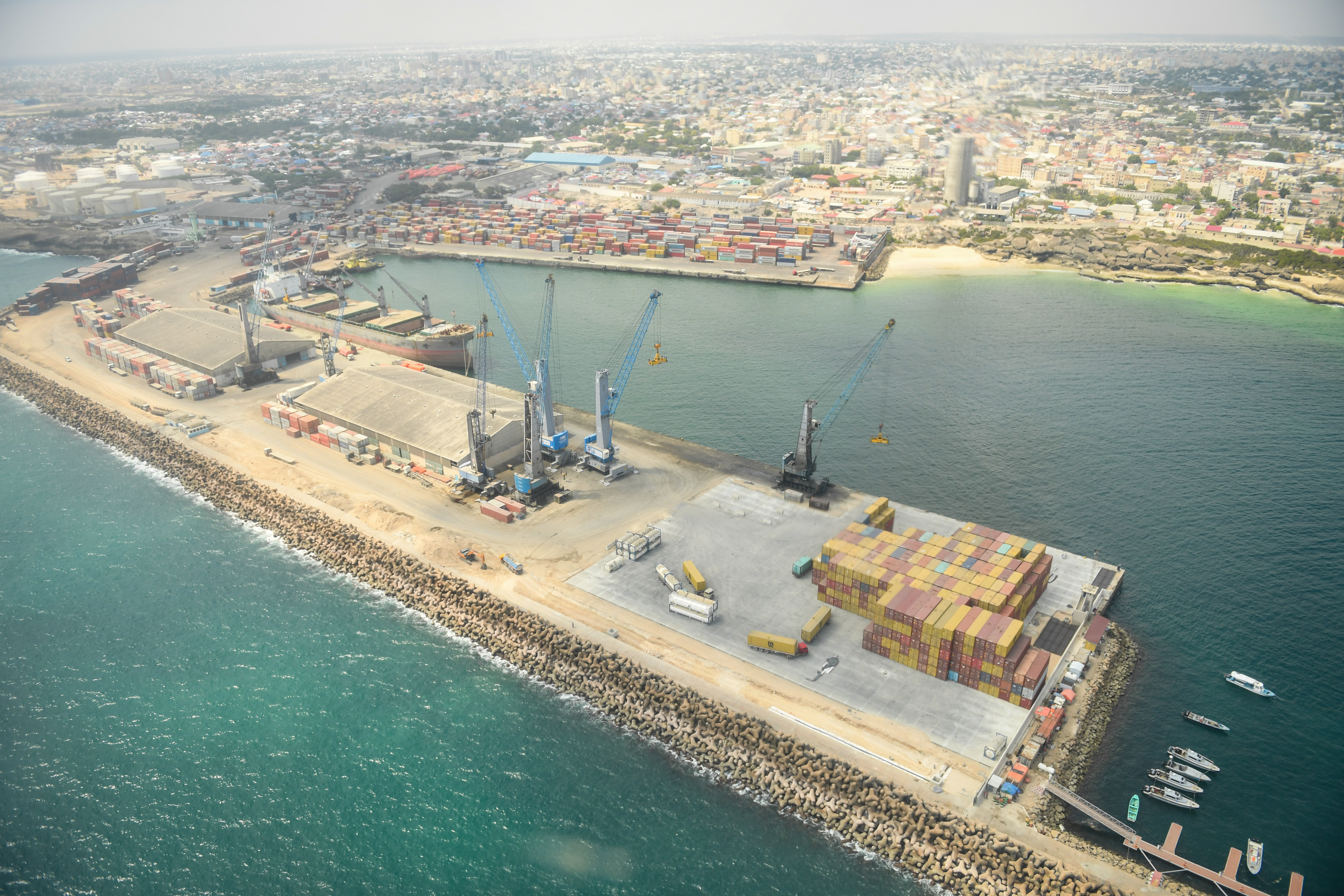
Aerial view of the Port of Mogadishu

With the advantage of being located near the Arabian Peninsula, Somali traders have increasingly begun to challenge Australia's traditional dominance over the Gulf Arab livestock and meat market, offering quality animals at very low prices. In response, Gulf Arab states have started to make strategic investments in the country, with Saudi Arabia building livestock export infrastructure and the United Arab Emirates purchasing large farmlands. Somalia is also a major world supplier of frankincense and myrrh. The modest industrial sector, based on the processing of agricultural products, accounts for 10% of Somalia's GDP. According to the Somali Chamber of Commerce and Industry, over six private airline firms also offer commercial flights to both domestic and international locations, including Daallo Airlines, Jubba Airways, African Express Airways, East Africa 540, Central Air and Hajara. In 2008, the Puntland government signed a multimillion-dollar deal with Dubai's Lootah Group, a regional industrial group operating in the Middle East and Africa. According to the agreement, the first phase of the investment is worth Dhs 170 m and will see a set of new companies established to operate, manage and build Bosaso's free trade zone and sea and airport facilities. The Bosaso Airport Company is slated to develop the airport complex to meet international standards, including a new 3,400 m (11,200 ft) runway, main and auxiliary buildings, taxi and apron areas, and security perimeters.

Prior to the outbreak of the civil war in 1991, the roughly 53 state-owned small, medium and large manufacturing firms were foundering, with the ensuing conflict destroying many of the remaining industries. However, primarily as a result of substantial local investment by the Somali diaspora, many of these small-scale plants have reopened and newer ones have been created. The latter include fish-canning and meat-processing plants in the northern regions, as well as about 25 factories in the Mogadishu area, which manufacture pasta, mineral water, confections, plastic bags, fabric, hides and skins, detergent and soap, aluminium, foam mattresses and pillows, fishing boats, carry out packaging, and stone processing. In 2004, a US$8.3 million Coca-Cola bottling plant also opened in the city, with investors hailing from various constituencies in Somalia. Foreign investment also included multinationals including General Motors and Dole Fruit.

=== Monetary and payment system ===
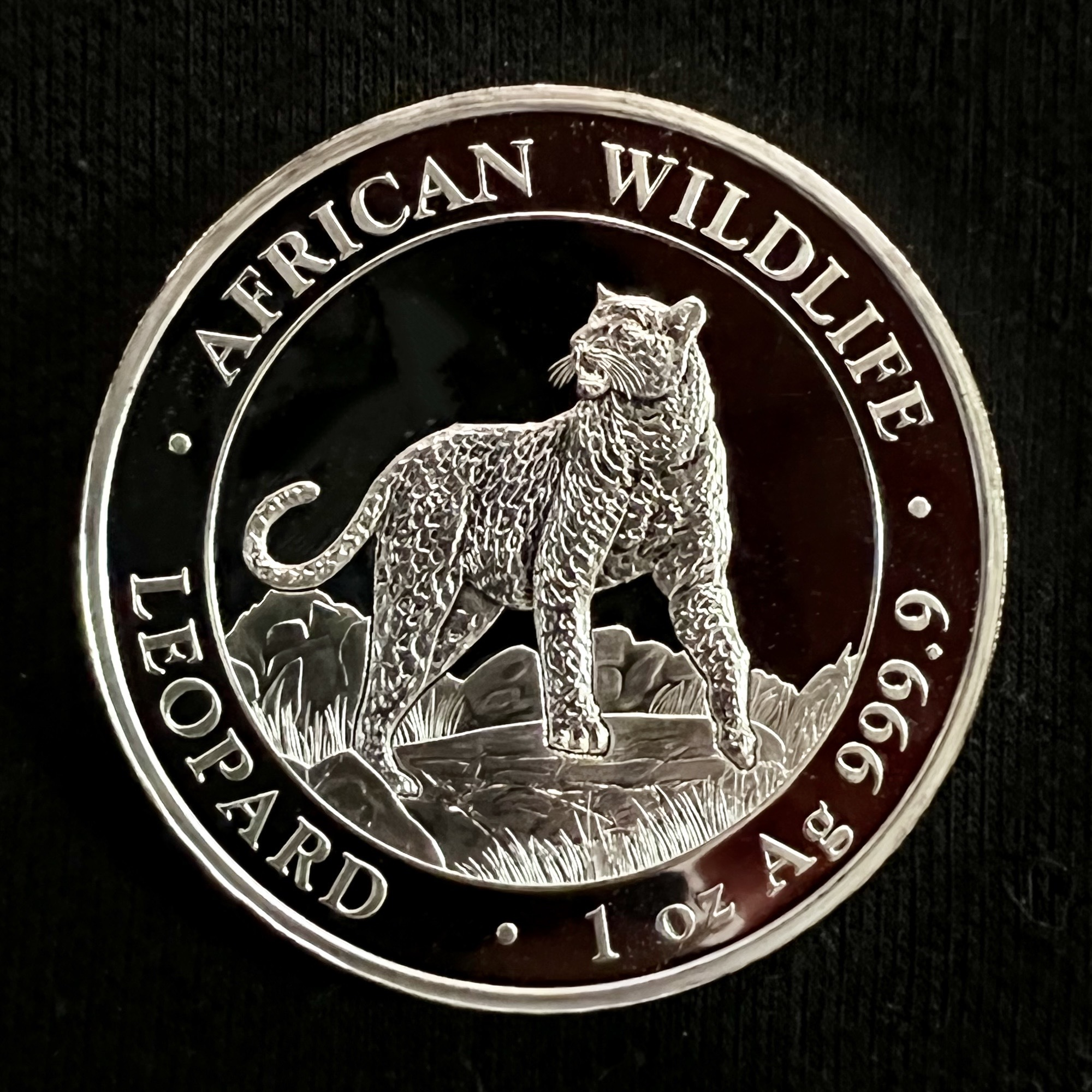
2022 Somalia 1 oz silver coin Leopard (100 shillings)

The Central Bank of Somalia is the official monetary authority of Somalia. In terms of financial management, it is in the process of assuming the task of both formulating and implementing monetary policy.

Owing to a lack of confidence in the local currency, the US dollar is widely accepted as a medium of exchange alongside the Somali shilling. Dollarisation notwithstanding, the large issuance of the Somali shilling has increasingly fuelled price hikes, especially for low value transactions. According to the Central Bank, this inflationary environment is expected to come to an end as soon as the bank assumes full control of monetary policy and replaces the presently circulating currency introduced by the private sector.

Although Somalia has had no central monetary authority for more than 15 years between the outbreak of the civil war in 1991 and the subsequent reestablishment of the Central Bank of Somalia in 2009, the nation's payment system is fairly advanced primarily due to the widespread existence of private money transfer operators (MTO) that have acted as informal banking networks.

These remittance firms (hawalas) have become a large industry in Somalia, with an estimated US$1.6 billion annually remitted to the region by Somalis in the diaspora via money transfer companies. Most are members of the Somali Money Transfer Association (SOMTA), an umbrella organisation that regulates the community's money transfer sector, or its predecessor, the Somali Financial Services Association (SFSA). The largest of the Somali MTOs is Dahabshiil, a Somali-owned firm employing more than 2,000 people across 144 countries with branches in London and Dubai.

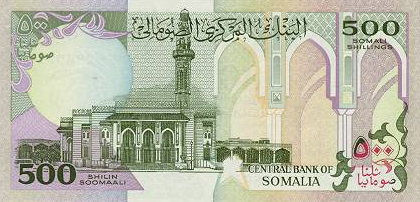
500 Somali shilling banknote

With a significant improvement in local security, Somali expatriates began returning to the country for investment opportunities. Coupled with modest foreign investment, the inflow of funds have helped the Somali shilling increase considerably in value. By March 2014, the currency had appreciated by almost 60% against the US dollar over the previous 12 months. The Somali shilling was the strongest among the 175 global currencies traded by Bloomberg, rising close to 50 percentage points higher than the next most robust global currency over the same period.

The Somalia Stock Exchange (SSE) is the national bourse of Somalia. It was founded in 2012 to attract investment from both Somali-owned firms and global companies in order to accelerate the ongoing post-conflict reconstruction process in Somalia. In June 2025, the National Securities Exchange of Somalia (NSES) was launched in Mogadishu, with future plans to trade stocks and sukuk bonds.

=== Energy and natural resources ===
The World Bank reports that, in 2007, electricity was largely supplied by local businesses. Among these domestic firms is the Somali Energy Company, which performs generation, transmission and distribution of electric power. In 2010, the nation produced 310 million kWh and consumed 288.3 million kWh of electricity, ranked 170th and 177th, respectively, according to the CIA.

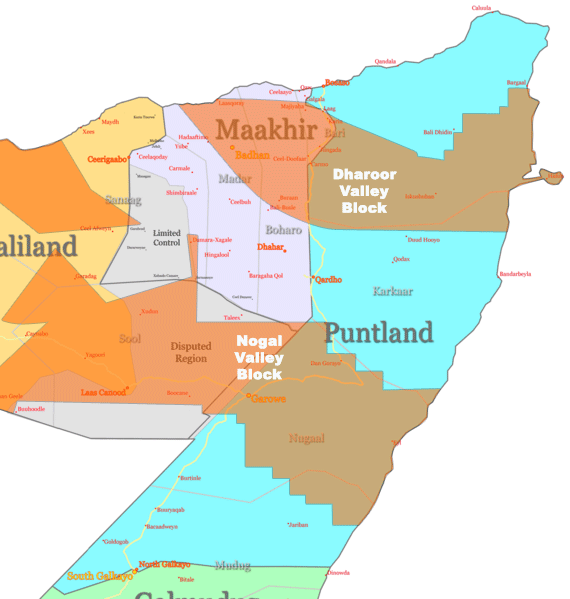
Oil blocks in Puntland

Somalia has reserves of several natural resources, including uranium, iron ore, tin, gypsum, bauxite, copper, salt and natural gas. The CIA reported that there are 5.663 billion cubic metres of proven natural gas reserves.

The presence or extent of proven oil reserves in Somalia is uncertain. The CIA asserts that as of 2011 there are no proven reserves of oil in the country, while UNCTAD suggests that most proven oil reserves in Somalia lie off its northwestern coast, in the Somaliland region. An oil group listed in Sydney, Range Resources, estimates that the Puntland region in the northeast has the potential to produce 5 billion barrels (790×10^{6} m^{3}) to 10 billion barrels (1.6×10^{9} m^{3}) of oil, compared to the 6.7 billion barrels of proven oil reserves in Sudan. As a result of these developments, the Somalia Petroleum Corporation was established by the federal government.

In the late 1960s, UN geologists discovered major uranium deposits and other rare mineral reserves in Somalia. The find was the largest of its kind, with industry experts estimating that the amount of the deposits could amount to over 25% of the world's then known uranium reserves of 800,000 tons. In 1984, the IUREP Orientation Phase Mission to Somalia reported that the country had 5,000 tons of uranium reasonably assured resources (RAR), 11,000 tons of uranium estimated additional resources (EAR) in calcrete deposits, as well as 0–150,000 tons of uranium speculative resources (SR) in sandstone and calcrete deposits. Somalia evolved into a major world supplier of uranium, with American, UAE, Italian and Brazilian mineral companies vying for extraction rights. Link Natural Resources has a stake in the central region, and Kilimanjaro Capital has a stake in the 1,161,400 acres (470,002 ha) Amsas-Coriole-Afgoi (ACA) Block, which includes uranium exploration.

The Trans-National Industrial Electricity and Gas Company is an energy conglomerate based in Mogadishu. It unites five major Somali companies from the trade, finance, security and telecommunications sectors, following a 2010 joint agreement signed in Istanbul to provide electricity and gas infrastructure in Somalia. With an initial investment budget of $1 billion, the company launched a labour-intensive energy program aimed at facilitating local industrialisation initiatives.

According to the Central Bank of Somalia, as the nation embarks on the path of reconstruction, the economy is expected not only to match its pre-civil war levels, but also to accelerate in growth and development due to Somalia's untapped natural resources.

=== Telecommunications and media ===
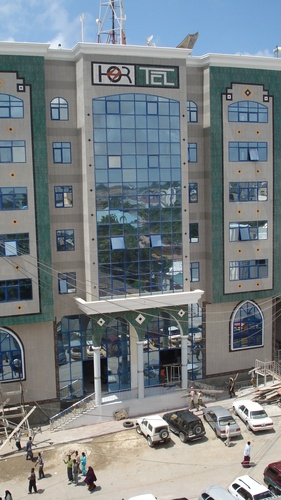
The Hormuud Telecom building in Mogadishu

After the start of the civil war, various new telecommunications companies began to spring up and compete to provide missing infrastructure. Funded by Somali entrepreneurs and backed by expertise from China, South Korea and Europe, these nascent telecommunications firms offer affordable mobile phone and Internet services that are not available in many other parts of the continent. Customers can conduct money transfers (such as through the popular Dahabshiil) and other banking activities via mobile phones, as well as easily gain wireless Internet access.

After forming partnerships with multinational corporations such as Sprint, ITT and Telenor, these firms now offer the cheapest and clearest phone calls in Africa. These Somali telecommunication companies also provide services to every city and town in Somalia. There are presently around 25 mainlines per 1,000 persons, and the local availability of telephone lines (tele-density) is higher than in neighbouring countries; three times greater than in adjacent Ethiopia. Prominent Somali telecommunications companies include Golis Telecom Group, Hormuud Telecom, Somafone, Nationlink, Netco, Telcom and Somali Telecom Group. Hormuud Telecom alone grosses about US$40 million a year. Despite their rivalry, several of these companies signed an inter-connectivity deal in 2005 that allows them to set prices, maintain and expand their networks, and ensure that competition does not get out of control.

The state-run Somali National Television is the principal national public service TV channel. After a twenty-year hiatus, the station was officially relaunched on 4 April 2011. Its radio counterpart Radio Mogadishu also broadcasts from the capital. Somaliland National TV and Puntland TV and Radio air from the northern regions.

Additionally, Somalia has several private television and radio networks. Among these are Horn Cable Television and Universal TV. The political Xog Doon and Xog Ogaal and Horyaal Sports broadsheets publish out of the capital. There are also a number of online media outlets covering local news, including Garowe Online, Wardheernews, and Puntland Post.

The internet country code top-level domain (ccTLD) for Somalia is .so. It was officially relaunched on 1 November 2010 by.SO Registry, which is regulated by the nation's Ministry of Posts and Telecommunications.

In November 2013, following a Memorandum of Understanding signed with Emirates Post in April of the year, the federal Ministry of Posts and Telecommunications officially reconstituted the Somali Postal Service (Somali Post). In October 2014, the ministry also relaunched postal delivery from abroad.

=== Tourism ===
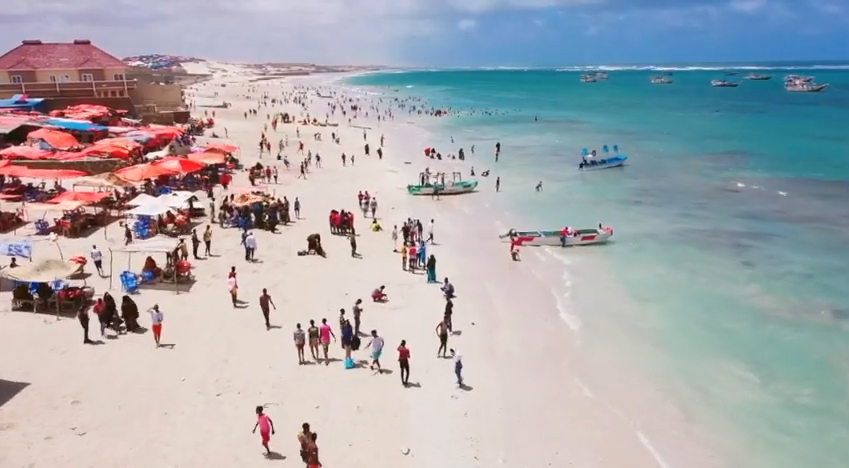
Aerial view of the shoreline at Lido Beach in Mogadishu, August 2020.

Somalia has a number of local attractions, consisting of historical sites, beaches, waterfalls, mountain ranges and national parks. The tourist industry is regulated by the national Ministry of Tourism. The autonomous Puntland and Somaliland regions maintain their own tourism offices. The Somali Tourism Association (SOMTA) also provides consulting services from within the country on the national tourist industry. As of March 2015, the Ministry of Tourism and Wildlife of the South West State announced that it is slated to establish additional game reserves and wildlife ranges.

=== Transport ===
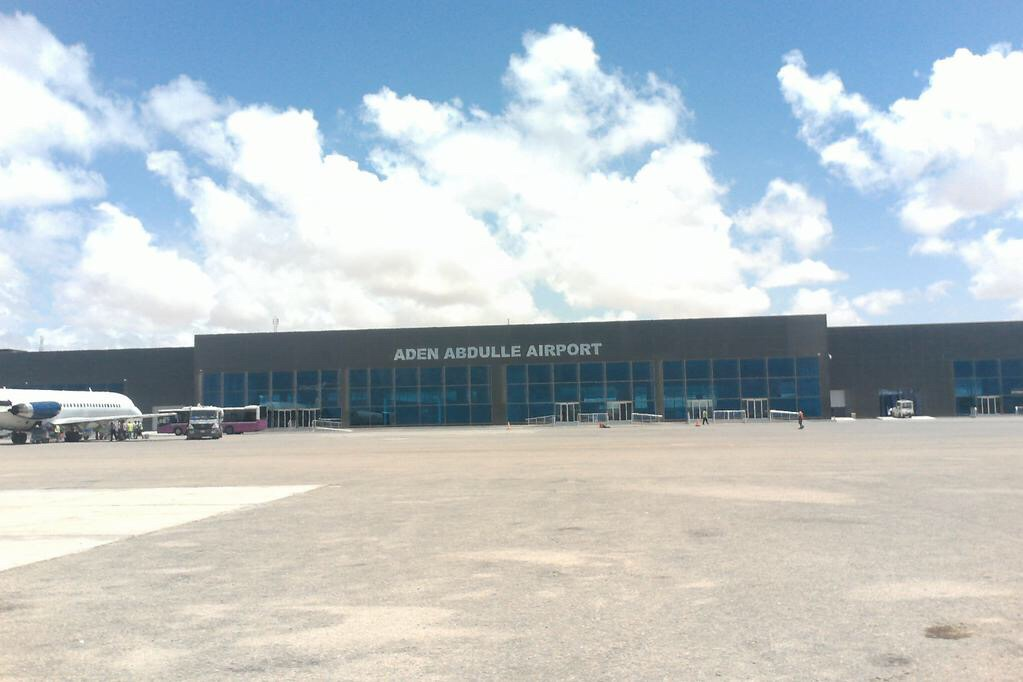
The Aden Adde International Airport

Somalia's network of roads is 22,100 km (13,700 mi) long. As of 2000, 2,608 km (1,621 mi) streets are paved and 19,492 km (12,112 mi) are unpaved. A 750 km (470 mi) highway connects major cities in the northern part of the country, such as Bosaso, Galkayo and Garowe, with towns in the south.

Sixty-two airports across Somalia accommodate aerial transportation; seven of these have paved runways. Among the latter, four airports have runways of over 3,047 metres (9,997 ft); two are between 2,438 and 3,047 m (7,999 and 9,997 ft) and one is 1,524 to 2,437 m (5,000 to 7,995 ft) long. There are fifty-five airports with unpaved landing areas. One has a runway of over 3,047 m; four are between 2,438 m and 3,047 m in length; twenty are 1,524 m to 2,437 m; twenty-four are 914 m to 1,523 m; and six are under 914 metres (2,999 ft). Major airports in the nation include the Aden Adde International Airport in Mogadishu, the Hargeisa International Airport in Hargeisa, the Kismayo Airport in Kismayo, the Baidoa Airport in Baidoa, and the Bender Qassim International Airport in Bosaso.

Established in 1964, Somali Airlines was the flag carrier of Somalia. It suspended operations during the civil war. However, a reconstituted Somali government later began preparations in 2012 for an expected relaunch of the airline, with the first new Somali Airlines aircraft scheduled for delivery by the end of December 2013. According to the Somali Chamber of Commerce and Industry, the void created by the closure of Somali Airlines has since been filled by various Somali-owned private carriers. Over six of these private airline firms offer commercial flights to both domestic and international locations, including Daallo Airlines, Jubba Airways, African Express Airways, East Africa 540, Central Air and Hajara. In 2025, it was announced that Somali Airlines would be making a return with the acquisition of two Airbus A320 aircraft.

Possessing the longest coastline on the continent, Somalia has several major seaports. Maritime transport facilities are found in the port cities of Mogadishu, Bosaso, Berbera, Kismayo and Merca. There is also one merchant marine. Established in 2008, it is cargo-based.

== Demographics ==
Population
Year	Million
1950	2.3
2000	9.0
2021	17.1

Somalia lacks reliable population data. The country had an estimated population of around 17.1 million inhabitants in 2021; the total population according to the 1975 census was 3.3 million. A United Nations Population Fund survey conducted in 2013 and 2014 estimated the total population to be 12,316,895. According to OCHA, the total population in 2025 was 19,280,850.

About 85% of residents are ethnic Somalis, who have historically inhabited the northern part of the country. They have traditionally been organised into nomadic pastoral clans, loose empires, sultanates and city-states. Civil strife in the early 1990s greatly increased the size of the Somali diaspora, as many of the best educated Somalis left.

Non-Somali ethnic minority groups make up the remainder of Somalia's population, and are largely concentrated in the southern regions. The Bantus, the largest ethnic minority group in Somalia, are the descendants of slaves brought from southeastern Africa by Arab and Somali traders. In 1940, there were about 50,000 Italians living in Italian Somaliland, although most Europeans left after independence.

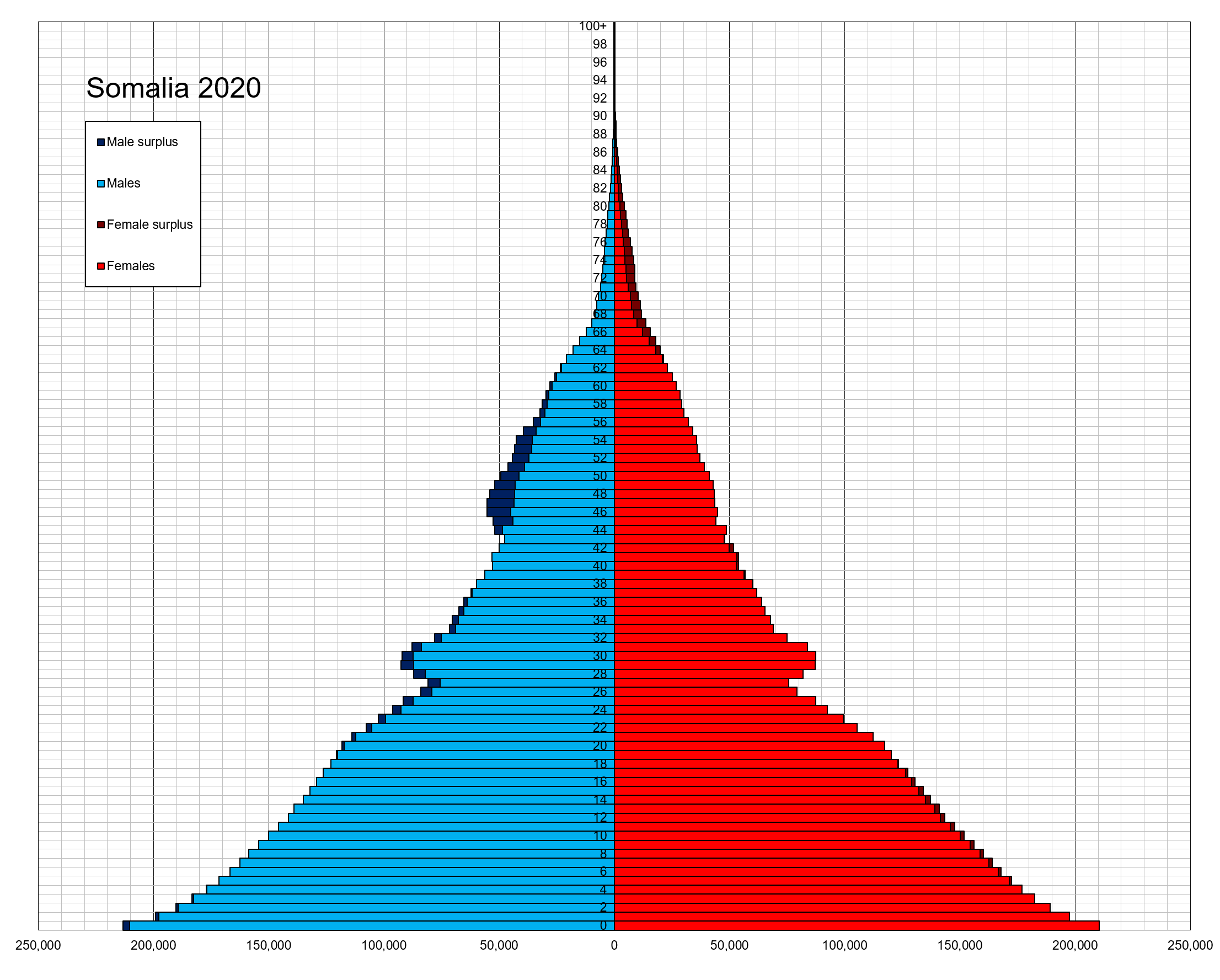
Population per age group

A sizeable Somali diaspora exists in various Western countries, the Arabian peninsula, and several African nations. The Somali diaspora is involved in the politics and development of Somalia.

Somalia's population is expanding at a growth rate of 1.75% per annum and a birth rate of 40.87 births per 1,000 people. The total fertility rate of Somalia is 6.08 children born per woman (2014 estimates), the fourth highest in the world, according to the CIA World Factbook. Most local residents are young, with a median age of 17.7 years; about 44% of the population is between the ages of 0–14 years, 52% is between the ages of 15–64 years, and only 2% is 65 years of age or older. The gender ratio is roughly balanced, with about as many men as women.

There is little reliable statistical information on urbanisation in Somalia. Rough estimates have been made indicating a rate of urbanisation of 4.8% per annum (2005–2010 est.), with many towns quickly growing into cities. Many ethnic minorities have also moved from rural areas to urban centres since the onset of the civil war, particularly to Mogadishu and Kismayo. According to the World Bank, the urban population stood at 55% in 2024.

=== Religion ===
Religion in Somalia 2010
Religion	Percent
Islam	99.8%
Other	0.2%

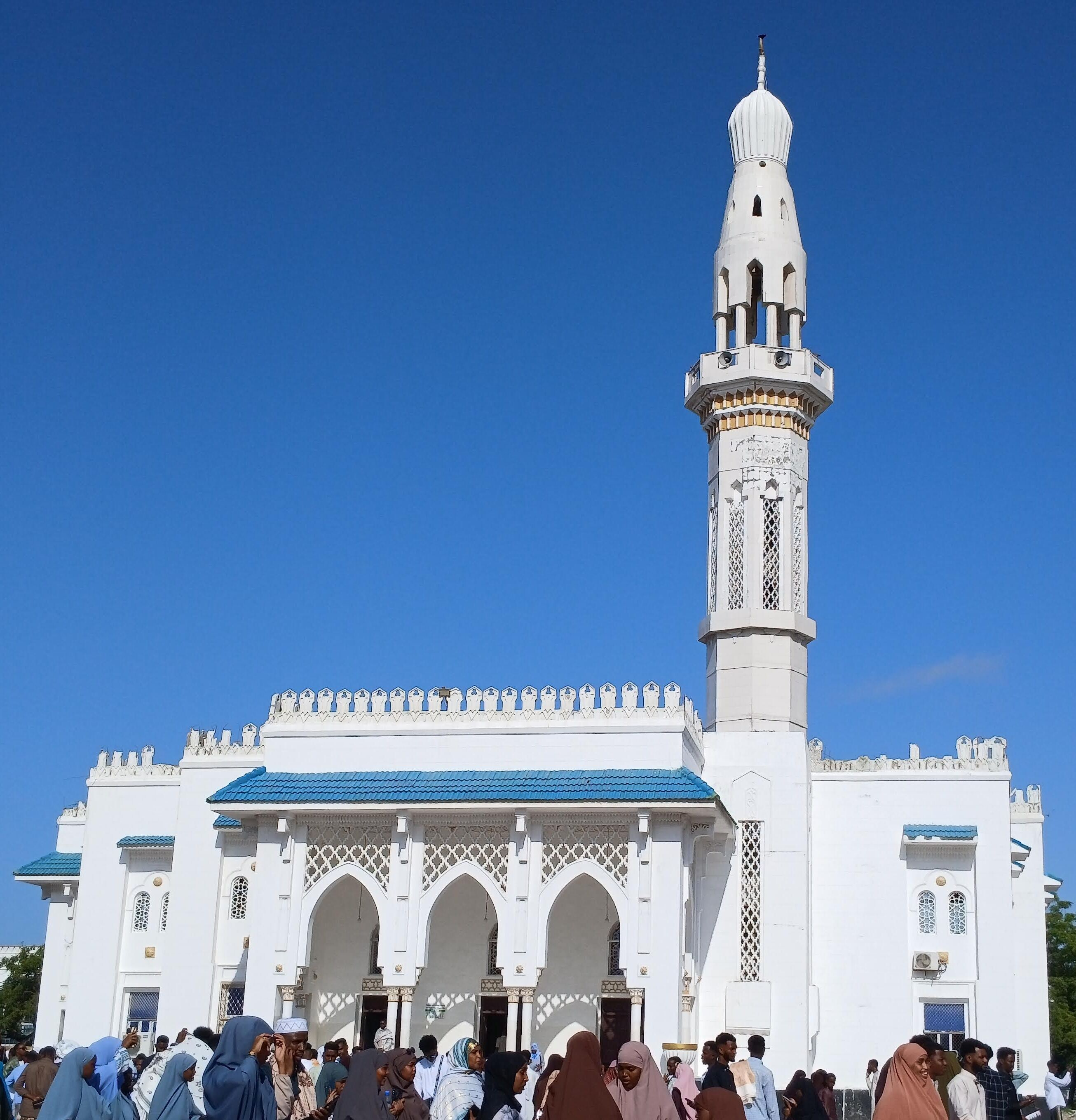
The Mosque of Islamic Solidarity in Mogadishu is the largest mosque in the Horn region.

According to the Pew Research Center, 99.8% of Somalia's population is Muslim. The majority belong to the Sunni branch of Islam and the Shafi'i school of Islamic jurisprudence. Sufism, the mystical dimension of Islam, is well-established, with many congregations of various Sufi orders. It is the state religion.

Christianity has around 1,000 adherents, less than 0.1% of the 2010 population. There were no Christians during early colonisation, although 100–200 followers came from the Catholic missions in British Somaliland, with no Catholic missions in Italian Somaliland.

According to the Pew Research Center, less than 0.1% of Somalia's population, mainly Bantus, were adherents of folk religions.

=== Languages ===
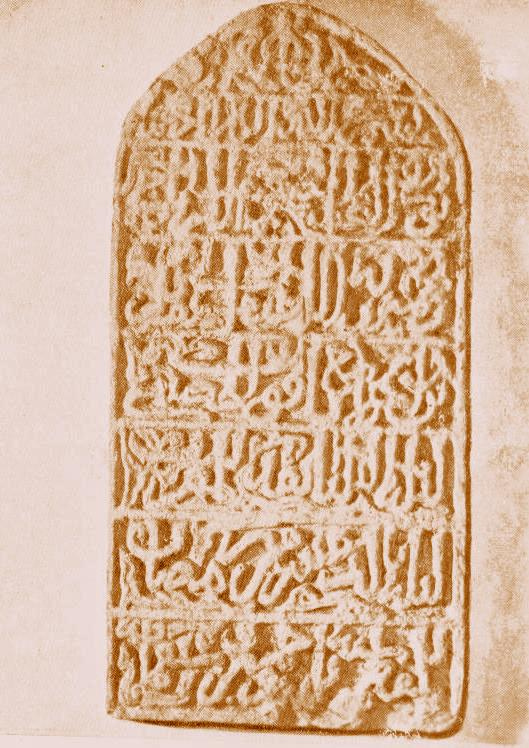
Stone tablet from the 14th century in the Wadaad orthography.

Somali is the official language of Somalia and Arabic is the second language. The Somali language is the mother tongue of the Somali people, the most populous ethnic group. It is the best documented member of the Cushitic branch of the Afro-Asiatic language family.

Somali dialects are divided into Northern, Benadir and Maay. Northern Somali is the basis for Standard Somali. Benadir is spoken on the Benadir coast, being the most spoken dialect. The coastal dialects have additional phonemes that absent in Standard Somali. Maay is principally spoken by the Rahanweyn clan in south.

Many writing systems have been used for Somali. Of these, the Somali alphabet is the most widely used, being the official writing script since the Supreme Revolutionary Council introduced it in 1972. Other orthographies that have been used for centuries for writing Somali include the long-established Arabic script and Wadaad's writing.

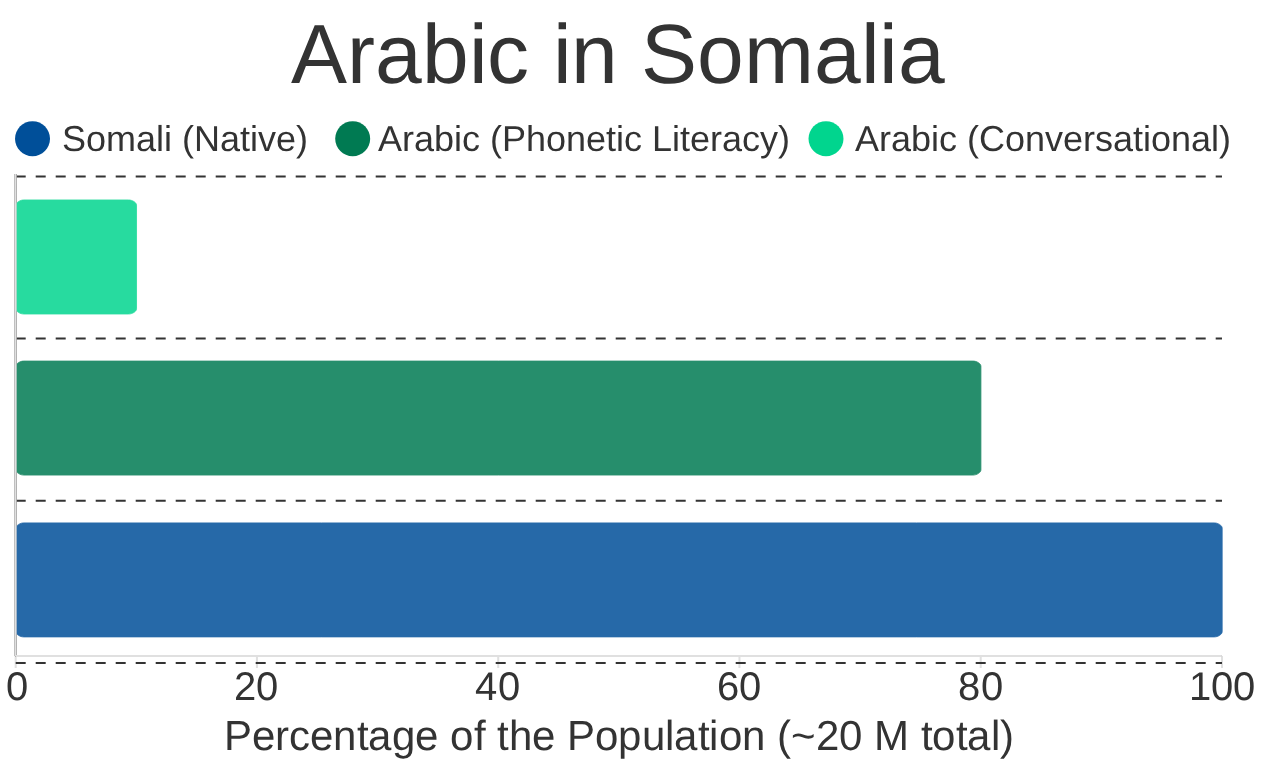
Estimated Arabic proficiency among the Somali population, distinguishing Quranic script literacy from spoken Arabic.

Arabic, the second language of Somalia, is spoken by a million or two million Somalis. This is because of longstanding ties with the Arab world, the influence of Arabic media, and religious education. It is a liturgical language as the language of the Qur'an. Somalis learn Arabic from a young age with an estimated 75 percent of children being able to read and write Arabic when they join formal schools at age six to eight years.

English is widely spoken and taught due to colonial legacies and globalisation. Italian was official in Italian Somaliland, but significantly diminished following independence.

Other languages include Bravanese, spoken by the Bravanese people, and Kibajuni of the Bajuni people.

=== Health and education ===
The Ministry of Education is officially responsible for education in Somalia, and oversees the nation's primary, secondary, technical and vocational schools, as well as primary and technical teacher training and non-formal education. About 15% of the government's budget is allocated toward education.

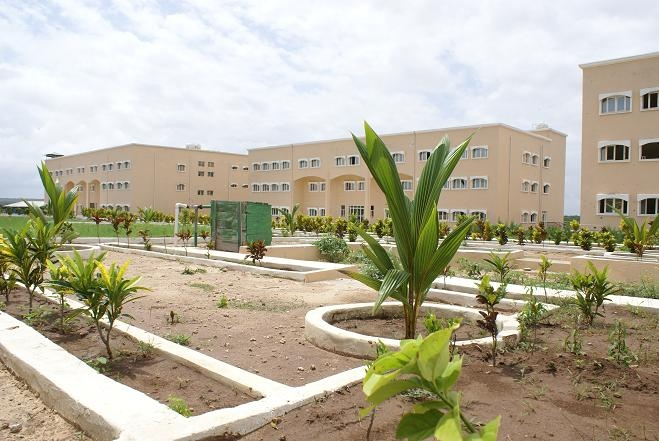
Mogadishu University's main campus in Mogadishu

Higher education in Somalia is largely private. Several universities in the country have ranked among the 100 best African universities.

Qu'ranic schools are the basic method of traditional religious instruction. They are the most stable method of non-formal education. It teaches the most students compared to other methods. It holds community support and uses local and widely abundant materials. It is often the only system accessible to Somalis in nomadic areas. The Somali government regulates it with the Ministry of Endowment and Islamic Affairs.

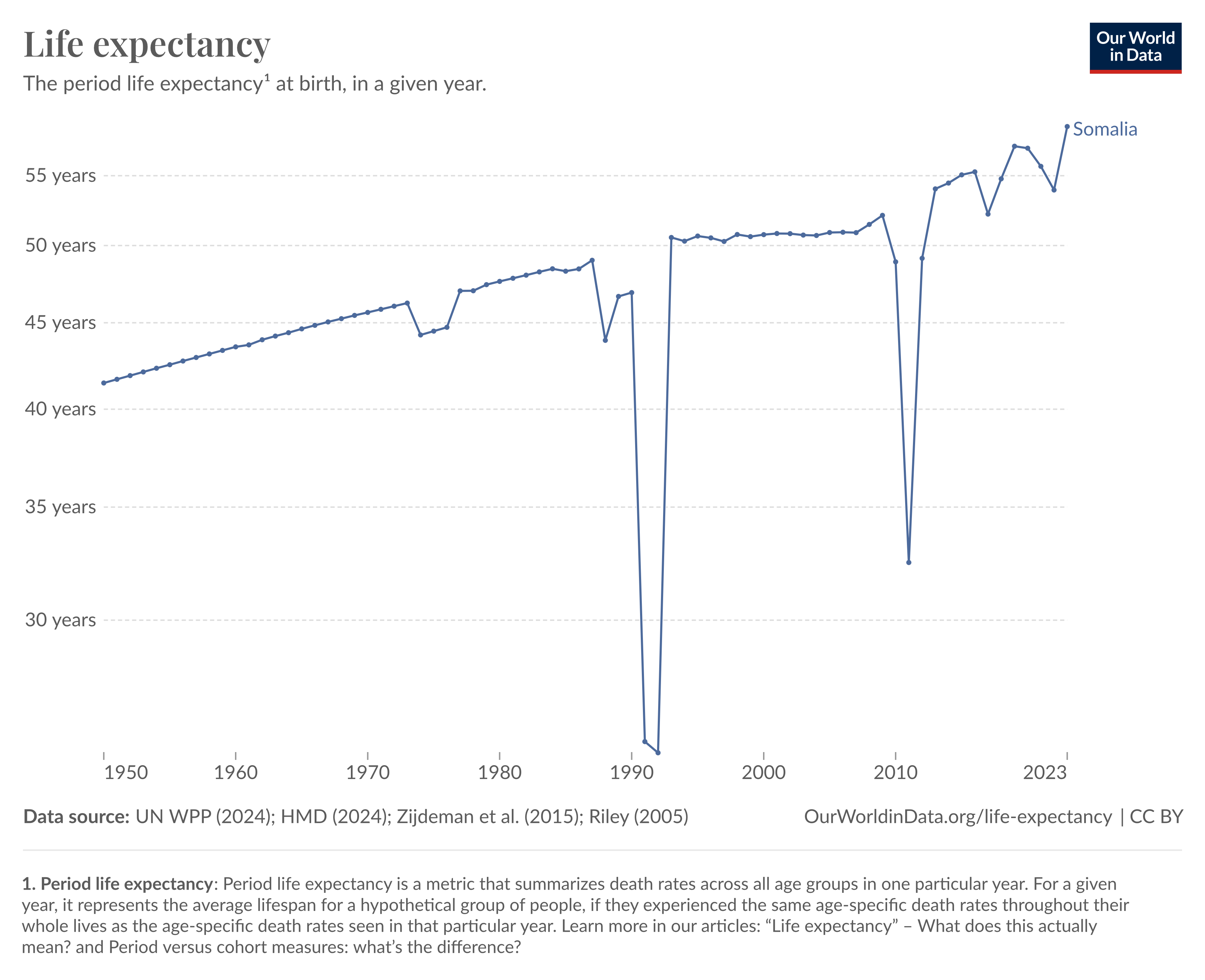
Life expectancy in Somalia, 1950 to 2023

Until the collapse of the federal government in 1991, the organisational and administrative structure of Somalia's healthcare sector was overseen by the Ministry of Health. Regional medical officials enjoyed some authority, but healthcare was largely centralised. The socialist government of former President of Somalia Siad Barre had put an end to private medical practice in 1972. Much of the national budget was devoted to military expenditure, leaving few resources for healthcare, among other services.

Somalia's public healthcare system was largely destroyed during the ensuing civil war. As with other previously nationalised sectors, informal providers have filled the vacuum and replaced the former government monopoly over healthcare, with access to facilities witnessing a significant increase. Many new healthcare centres, clinics, hospitals and pharmacies have in the process been established through home-grown Somali initiatives. The cost of medical consultations and treatment in these facilities is low, at US$5.72 per visit in health centres (with a population coverage of 95%), and US$1.89–3.97 per outpatient visit and US$7.83–13.95 per bed day in primary through tertiary hospitals.

Comparing the 2005–2010 period with the half-decade just prior to the outbreak of the conflict (1985–1990), life expectancy actually increased from an average of 47 years for men and women to 48.2 years for men and 51 years for women. Similarly, the number of one-year-olds fully immunised against measles rose from 30% in 1985–1990 to 40% in 2000–2005, and for tuberculosis, it grew nearly 20% from 31% to 50% over the same period.

The number of infants with low birth weight fell from 16 per 1,000 to 0.3, a 15% drop in total over the same time frame. Between 2005 and 2010 as compared to the 1985–1990 period, infant mortality per 1,000 births also fell from 152 to 109.6. Significantly, maternal mortality per 100,000 births fell from 1,600 in the pre-war 1985–1990 half-decade to 1,100 in the 2000–2005 period. The number of physicians per 100,000 people also rose from 3.4 to 4 over the same time frame, as did the percentage of the population with access to sanitation services, which increased from 18% to 26%.

According to United Nations Population Fund data on the midwifery workforce, there is a total of 429 midwives (including nurse-midwives) in Somalia, with a density of one midwife per 1,000 live births. Eight midwifery institutions presently exist in the country, two of which are private. Midwifery is regulated by the government, and a licence is required to practice professionally. A live registry is also in place to keep track of licensed midwives. In addition, midwives in the country are officially represented by a local midwives association, with 350 registered members.

According to a 2005 World Health Organization estimate, about 97.9% of Somalia's women and girls underwent female genital mutilation, a pre-marital custom mainly endemic to the Horn of Africa and parts of the Near East. Encouraged by women in the community, it is primarily intended to protect chastity, deter promiscuity, and offer protection from assault. By 2013, UNICEF in conjunction with the Somali authorities reported that the prevalence rate among 1- to 14-year-old girls in the autonomous northern Puntland and Somaliland regions had dropped to 25% following a social and religious awareness campaign. About 93% of Somalia's male population is also reportedly circumcised.

Somalia has one of the lowest HIV infection rates on the continent. This is attributed to the Muslim nature of Somali society and adherence of Somalis to Islamic morals. While the estimated HIV prevalence rate in Somalia in 1987 (the first case report year) was 1% of adults, a 2012 report from UNAIDS says that since 2004, estimates from 0.7% to 1.0% have been assumed.

Although healthcare is now largely concentrated in the private sector, the country's public healthcare system is in the process of being rebuilt, and is overseen by the Ministry of Health. The Minister of Health is Qamar Adan Ali. The autonomous Puntland region maintains its own Ministry of Health, as does the Somaliland region in northwestern Somalia.

== Culture ==
=== Architecture ===
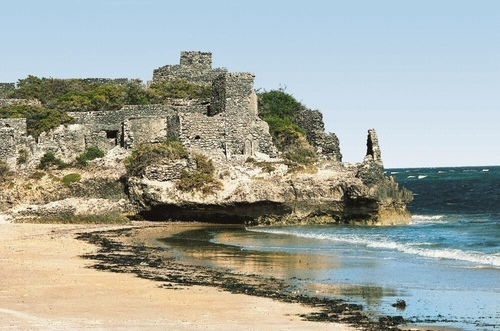
The Citadel of Gondershe

Somali architecture is a rich and diverse tradition of engineering and design. Spanning the country's ancient, medieval and early modern periods, it also embraces the fusion of Somalo-Islamic architecture with contemporary Western designs.

In ancient Somalia, pyramidical structures known in Somali as taalo were a popular burial style, with hundreds of these dry stone monuments scattered around the country today. Houses were built of dressed stone similar to the ones in ancient Egypt. There are also examples of courtyards and large stone walls enclosing settlements, such as the Wargaade Wall.

The adoption of Islam in Somalia's early medieval history brought Islamic architectural influences from Arabia and Persia. This stimulated a shift in construction from dry stone and other related materials to coral stone, sun dried bricks, and the widespread use of limestone in Somali architecture. Many of the new architectural designs, such as mosques, were built on the ruins of older structures, a practice that would continue throughout the following centuries.

=== Literature ===
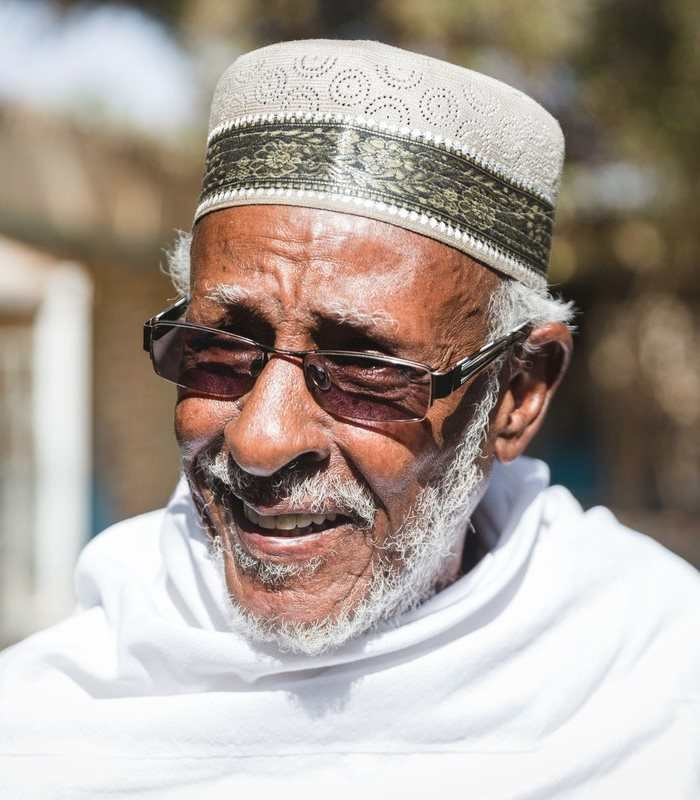
Famed poet, philosopher and orator Hadrawi in 2018.

The Somali community has been a source of many significant poets, writers, and Islamic figures over the years, a considerable proportion of whom have played a pivotal role in influencing and moulding the trajectory of Muslim scholarship and traditions, not just in the Horn of Africa but also reaching far into the Arabian Peninsula and other regions around the world. Somalia has also been called by, among others, the Canadian novelist and scholar Margaret Laurence, a "Nation of Poets" and a "Nation of Bards". Famed British explorer and writer Richard Burton wrote that many Somalis are exceptionally familiar with literature and poetry.

With the adoption of the Latin alphabet in 1972 as the nation's standard orthography, numerous contemporary Somali authors have also released novels, some of which have received worldwide acclaim. Among these modern authors, Nuruddin Farah is the most renowned, receiving, among other honours, the 1998 Neustadt international prize for Literature. Faarax M.J. Cawl is another notable Somali author who is famous for his novel set in the Dervish era, Ignorance is the enemy of love. Somali poetry also thrived during this era with Hadraawi gaining national renown for his prose and poetry.

=== Music ===
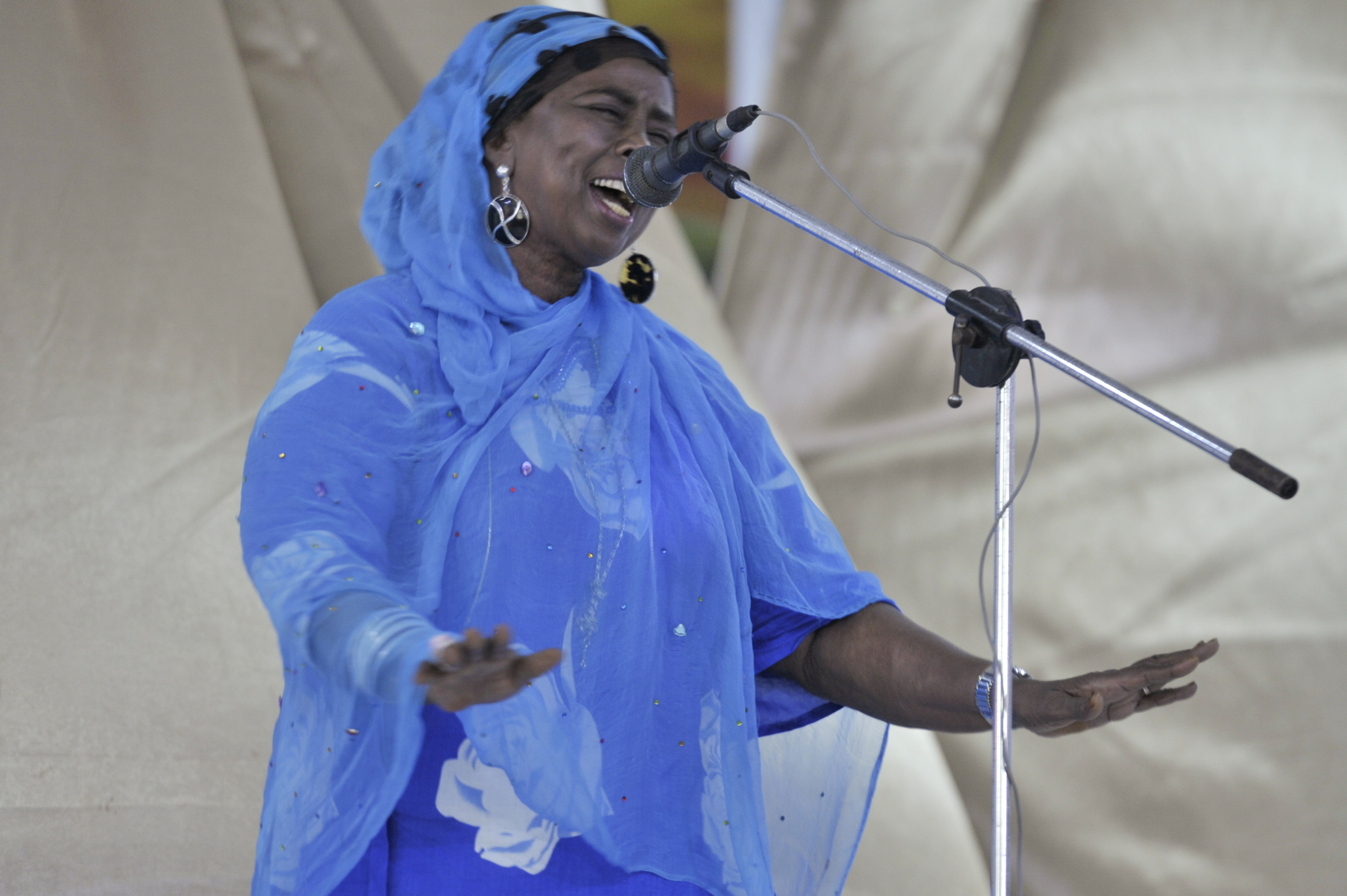
Prominent Somali singer Hibo Nura, who began her career in 1968, performs in Mogadishu, April 2014.

Somalia has a rich musical heritage centred on traditional Somali folklore. Most Somali songs are pentatonic. Somali music might be mistaken for the sounds of nearby regions such as Ethiopia, Sudan or the Arabian Peninsula, but it is ultimately recognisable by its unique tunes and styles. Traditional instruments prominently featured in the music of Somalia include the oud lute. It is often accompanied by small drums and a reed flute in the background. Somali songs are usually the product of collaboration between lyricists (midho), songwriters (laxan) and singers (codka or "voice"). Qaraami, a popular genre of Somali music, is usually played with an oud and deals with themes such as love.

=== Cuisine ===
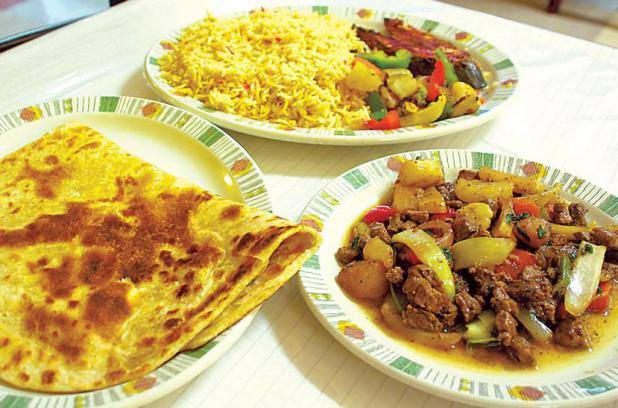
Somali rice (bariis) and fish (kalluun), liver (beer, Somali pronunciation: [beːr]) with vegetables, and flatbread (sabaayad)

Somali cuisine is a mixture of various culinary influences that is derived from Arab, Indian, and Italian flavours as a direct result of Somalia's extensive history of trade and commerce. Examples of Somali dishes include staples like rice and pasta, along with meats such as lamb, beef, and chicken. Aromatic spices such as cumin, cardamom, and coriander are often used to give distinct flavours to dishes.

Alongside stews, traditional flatbreads, and pastries, another Somali dish is the "Canjeero/Lahooh", a variation of fermented pancake-like flatbread that is savoured in Somalia and in neighbouring countries like Ethiopia, Eritrea, and Yemen. Additionally, camel meat and milk are considered a delicacy.

Somali rice, the usual staple for dinner or lunch, is typically seasoned and mixed with various ingredients such as meat, vegetables, and, in a somewhat unique manner, raisins. It is not uncommon for this dish to be presented in a visually appealing manner by incorporating multiple colours, as certain portions may be artificially tinted with shades of yellow or orange using saffron and other spices to enhance its aesthetic appeal.

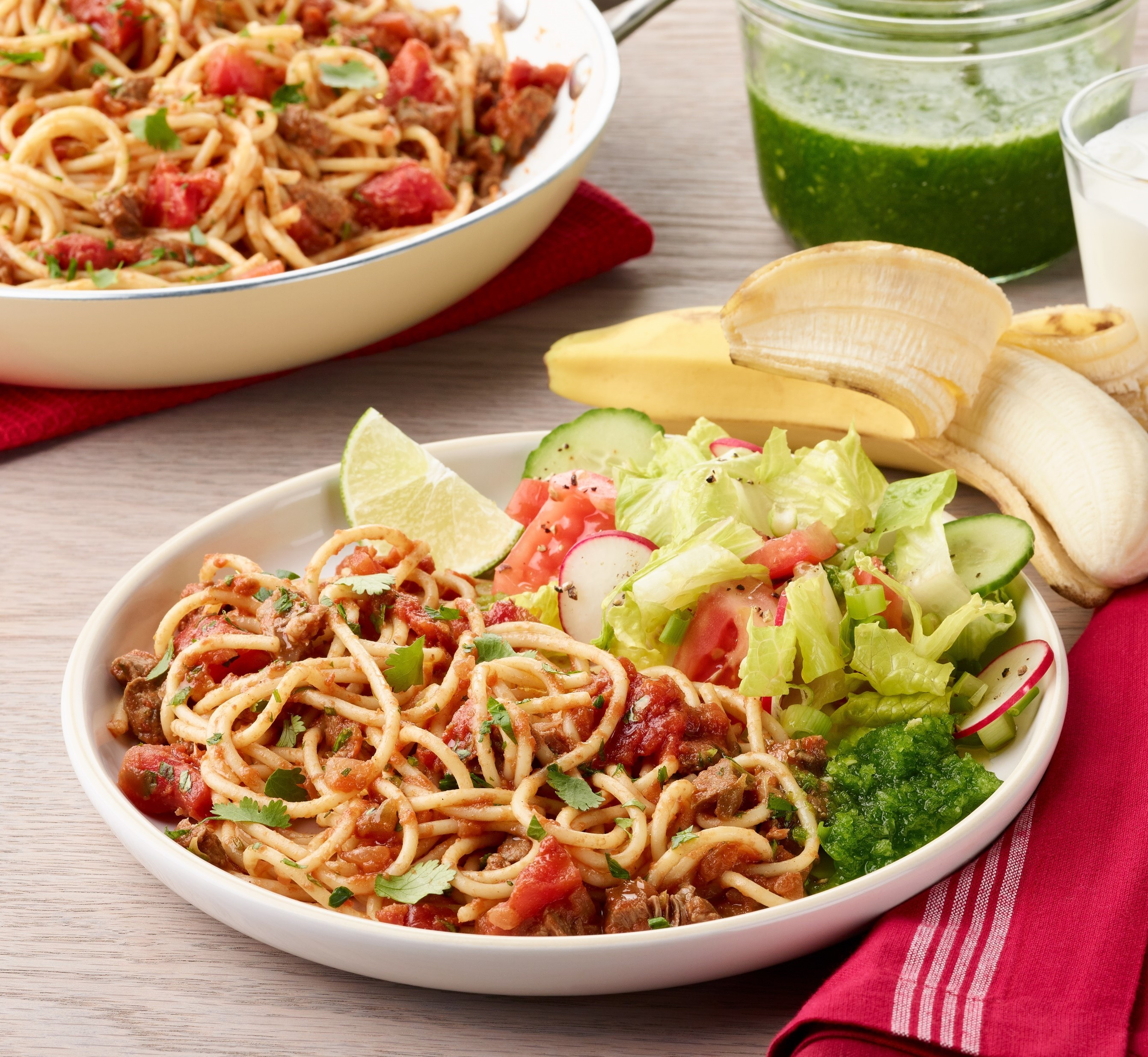
Baasto (Somali pasta) served with suugo (meat sauce) and a banana.

The period of Italian colonial rule saw the widespread adoption of pasta and lasagne, especially in the south.

Tea and coffee are also really popular. Somalis were among the early adopters of coffee consumption, and Somali merchants were some of the first traders to export coffee beans. Somali coffee, known locally as 'Qahwo' and tea 'Shah', stand out due to their preparation method, which involves selecting various spices to enhance their flavour profile.

'Xalwo', which is closely associated with Omani 'Halwa', is a smooth jelly-like treat that is made with spices, seeds, nuts, and caramelised sugar. This confection is commonly served together with Somali 'Qahwo'. After meals, homes are traditionally perfumed using frankincense or incense (unsi), which is prepared inside an incense burner referred to as a dabqaad.

=== Sports ===
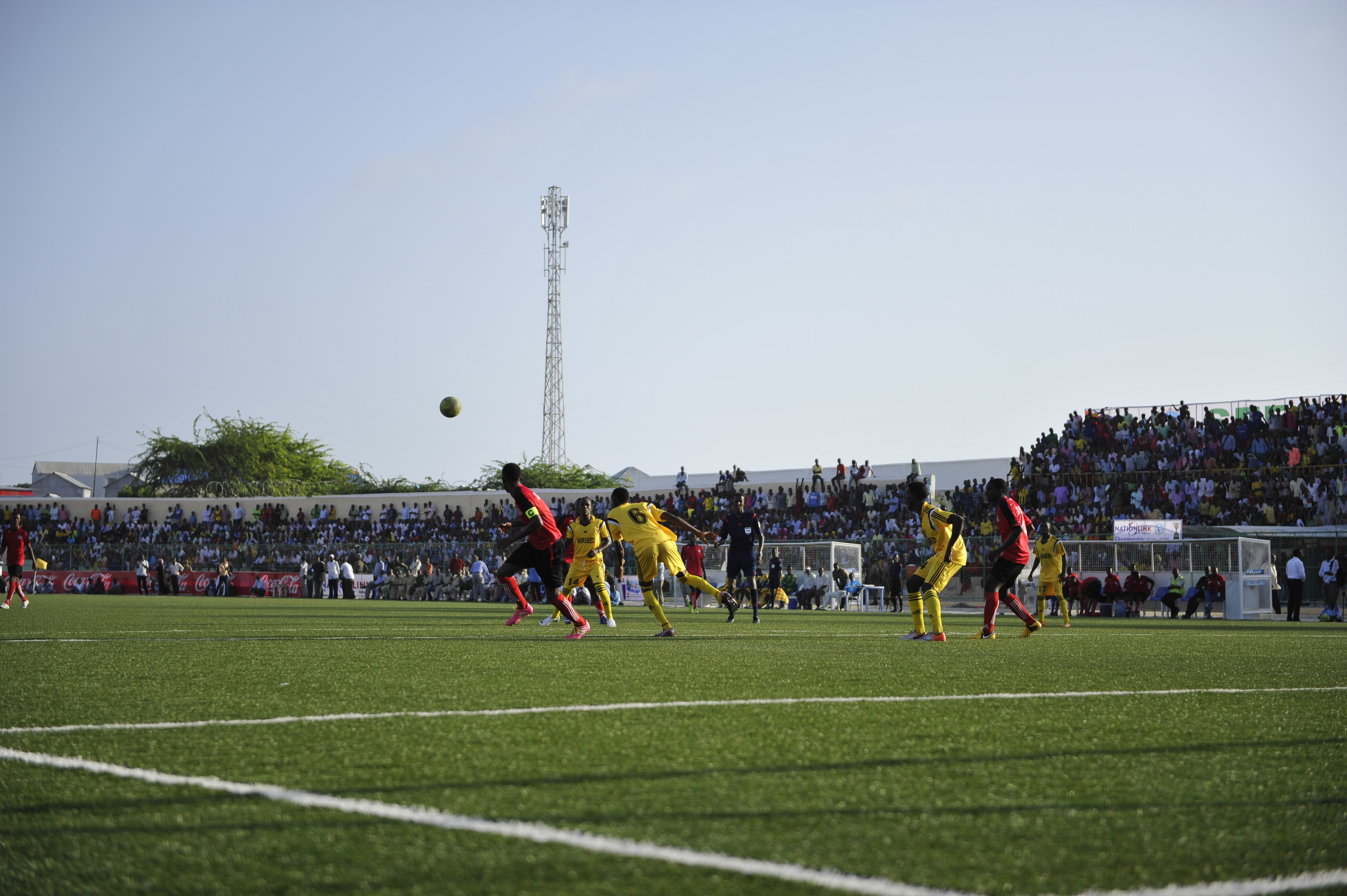
Football game at Banadir Stadium

Football is the most popular sport in Somalia. Important domestic competitions are the Somalia League and Somalia Cup, with the Somalia national football team playing internationally. In 2017, Somalia won the U-17 title at the CECAFA championship final.

Basketball is also played in the country. The FIBA Africa Championship 1981 was hosted in Mogadishu from 15 to 23 December 1981, during which the national basketball team received the bronze medal.

In 2013, a Somalia national bandy team was formed in Borlänge. It participated in the Bandy World Championship 2014.

In the martial arts, Faisal Jeylani Aweys and Mohamed Deq Abdulle of the national taekwondo team took home a silver medal and fourth place, respectively, at the 2013 Open World Taekwondo Challenge Cup in Tongeren. Additionally, Mohamed Jama has won both world and European titles in K-1 and Thai Boxing. Ramla Ali became the first Somali boxer to compete at the Olympic Games after having previously also won the country's first international gold medal in boxing.

== See also ==
- Outline of Somalia

== Bibliography ==
- Diriye Abdullahi, Mohamed (2001). Culture and Customs of Somalia. Culture and customs of Africa. Westport, Conn: Greenwood Press. ISBN 978-0-313-31333-2.
- Alpers, Edward A. (1976). "Gujarat and the Trade of East Africa, c. 1500–1800". The International Journal of African Historical Studies. 9 (1): 22–44. doi:10.2307/217389. JSTOR 217389.
- Gebru Tareke (2009). The Ethiopian Revolution: War in the Horn of Africa. New Haven, CT: Yale University Press. ISBN 978-0-300-14163-4.
- Laitin, David D. (1977). Politics, Language, and Thought: The Somali Experience. Chicago: University of Chicago Press. ISBN 978-0-226-46791-7.
- Lecarme, Jacqueline; Maury, Carole (1987). "A Software Tool for Research in Linguistics and Lexicography: Application to Somali". Computers and Translation. 2 (1): 21–36. doi:10.1007/BF01540131. S2CID 6515240.
- Mauri, Arnaldo (1971). "Banking Development in Somalia". In Dell'Amore, Giordano (ed.). Banking Systems in Africa. Milan: Cariplo – Finafrica. pp. 209–217.
- Samatar, Said S. (1982). Oral Poetry and Somali Nationalism. Cambridge: Cambridge University Press. ISBN 978-0-521-10457-9.
- Schraeder, Peter J. (2006). "From Irredentism to Secession: The Decline of Pan-Somali Nationalism" (PDF). In Barrington, Lowell W. (ed.). After Independence: Making and Protecting the Nation in Postcolonial and Postcommunist States. Ann Arbor: University of Michigan Press. pp. 107–137. ISBN 978-0-472-09898-9.
- Shay, Shaul (2014). Somalia in Transition Since 2006. New Brunswick: Transaction Publishers. ISBN 978-1-4128-5390-3.
- Warmington, Eric Herbert (1995). The Commerce Between the Roman Empire and India. South Asia Books. ISBN 81-215-0670-0.
- Zolberg, Aristide R.; Suhrke, Astri; Aguayo, Sergio (1989). Escape from Violence: Conflict and the Refugee Crisis in the Developing World. New York: Oxford University Press. ISBN 978-0-19-505592-4.
- Rosati, A.; Tewolde, A.; Mosconi, C. (2007). Animal Production and Animal Science Worldwide. WAAP book of the year. Wageningen: Wageningen Academic Publishers. p. 169. ISBN 978-90-8686-034-0.
