= Yusuf Garaad Omar =

Somali politician

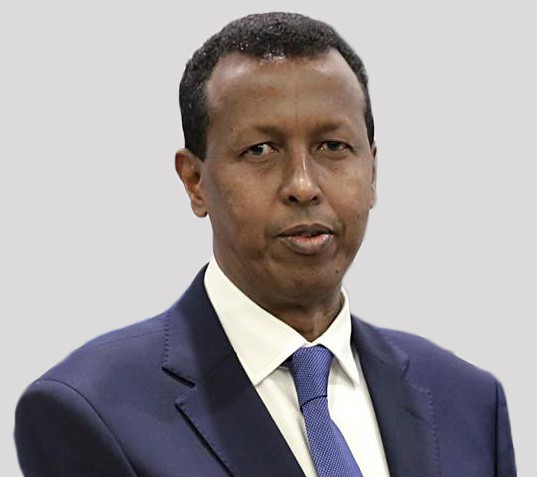

Minister of Foreign Affairs
- In office 29 March 2017 – 4 January 2018
- President: Mohamed Abdullahi Mohamed
- Prime Minister: Hassan Ali Khaire
- Preceded by: Abdusalam H. Omer
- Succeeded by: Ahmed Isse Awad

Ambassador of Somalia to the United Nations
- Incumbent
- Assumed office November 2016
- Preceded by: Elmi Ahmed Duale

Personal details
- Born: 26 June 1960 (age 66) Mogadishu, Trust Territory of Somalia
- Education: Somali National University; University of Siena
- Occupation: Diplomat

Yusuf Garaad Omar (Somali: Yuusuf Garaad Cumar, Arabic: يوسف جراد عمر) (born 26 June 1960 in Mogadishu) is a Somali journalist, diplomat and politician. He previously served as Somalia ambassador to the United Nations and was a senior advisor to President Hassan Sheikh Mohamud. He was the Somali Minister of Foreign Affairs from March 2017 until he was fired by then Prime Minister Hassan Ali Khaire in January 2018.

== Early life and education ==
Omar was born on 26 June 1960 in the Hamar Jajab district of Mogadishu, Somalia. He attended high school in the capital. Omar later studied French at the Somali National University, where he earned a Bachelor of Arts in linguistics. In 1990, he moved to Italy and pursued an advanced degree in anthropology at the University of Siena. He later on attended the Global Master of Arts Program at The Fletcher School of Law and Diplomacy at Tufts University in Massachusetts, USA. He is also multilingual, speaking Somali, Italian, French and English.

== Career ==
=== Journalism and politics ===
In a professional capacity, Omar has worked as a professional journalist for many years. He initially was a correspondent with Radio Mogadishu from 1984 until the outbreak of the civil war in Somalia in 1991. Omar thereafter served as a freelance reporter in Italy. He later joined the BBC Somali Service in 1992, eventually becoming the chairman of the department eight years later.

In 2012, Yusuf left from his position at the BBC to run for political office in Somalia. He subsequently presented himself as one of the potential candidates in the country's 2012 presidential elections.

in 2013 he served as a senior Adviser to the President of Somalia. He was also assigned to a number of key tasks including negotiations with the Breakaway Somali Region of Somaliland aimed at safeguarding the territorial integrity and the unity of Somalia.

=== Minister of Foreign Affairs of Somalia ===
On 21 March 2017, Omar was appointed Minister of Foreign Affairs of Somalia by then Prime Minister Hassan Ali Khaire. He succeeded Abdusalam H. Omer at the position. On 29 March 2017, Omar formally assumed office after sworn in.

== See also ==
- Abdusalam H. Omer
- Abdirahman Duale Beyle
- List of foreign ministers in 2017
- List of current foreign ministers

Political offices
Preceded by Abdisalam Omer	Foreign Minister of Somalia; 29 March 2017 – 4 January 2018	Succeeded by Ahmed Isse Awad
