= China–Somalia relations =

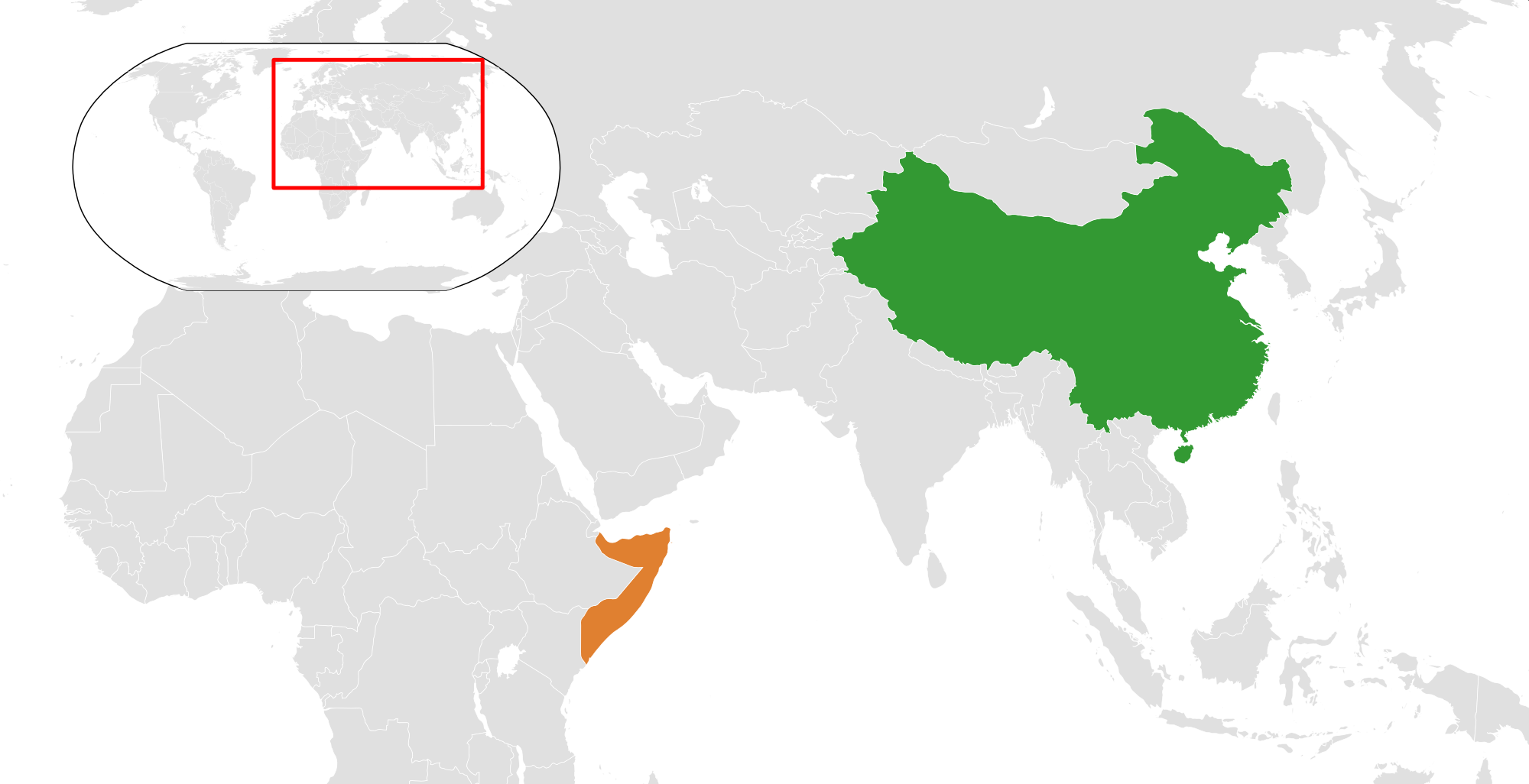
- Somalia: China

Diplomatic mission
- Embassy of Somalia, Beijing: Embassy of China, Mogadishu

China–Somalia relations are the bilateral relations between China and Somalia. Somalia maintains an embassy in Beijing. China has an embassy in Mogadishu. Somalia and China are upgrading their relationship to a Strategic Partnership.

== History ==
Somalia and China have a long relationship in terms of trade, military, culture and language.

=== Middle Ages ===
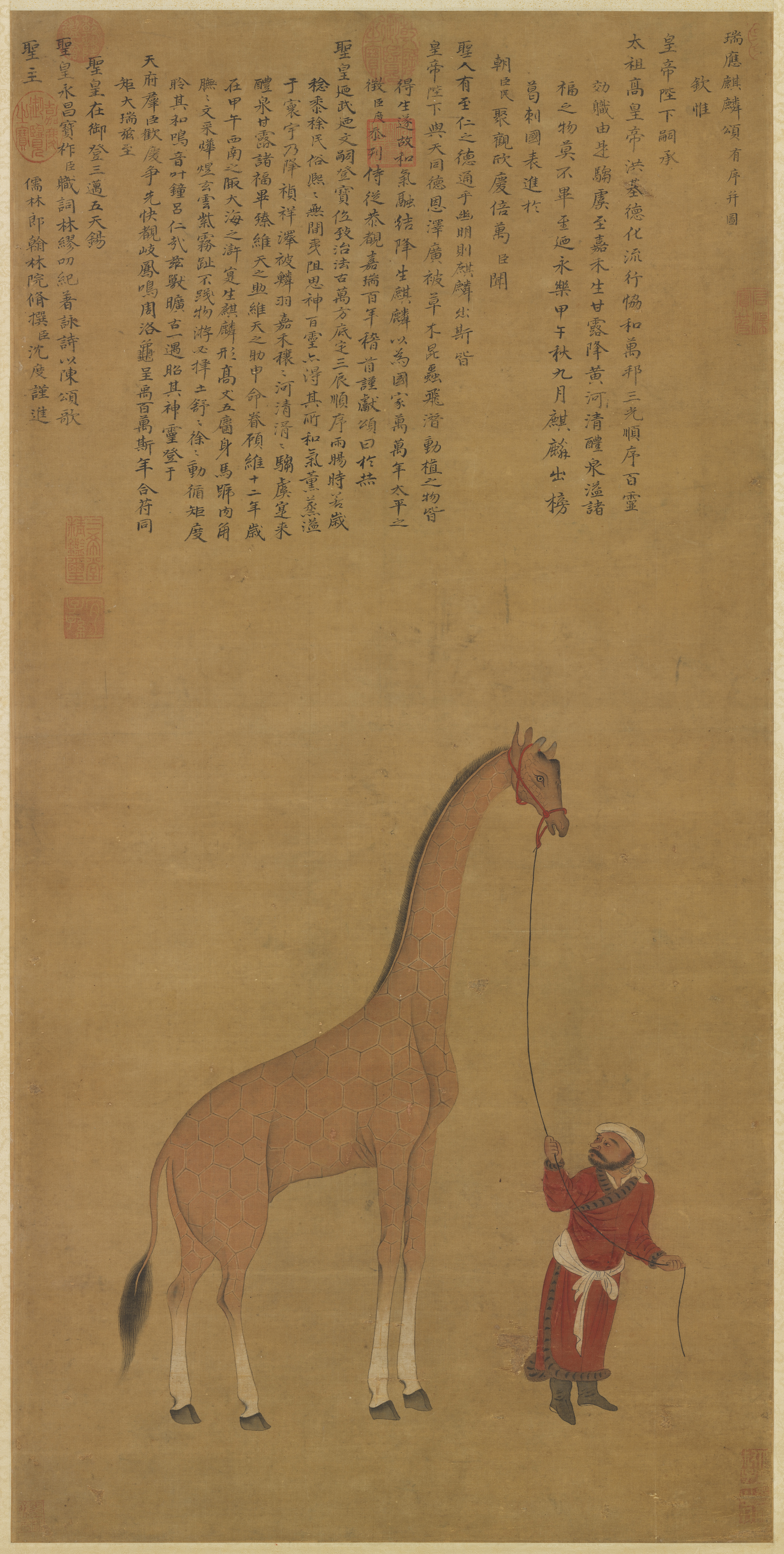
Exotic animals such as the giraffe caught and sold by Somali merchants were very popular in medieval China.

Relations between Somalia and China long predate the Middle Ages. Through trade, the peoples of both areas established good relations. Giraffes, zebras and incense were exported to the Ming Empire of China, which established Somali merchants as leaders in the commerce between Asia and Africa, and in the process influenced the Chinese language with the Somali language and vice versa. The Chinese exported celadon wares, spices and muskets in return for horses, exotic animals and ivory. The prominent Hui-Chinese explorer, mariner, diplomat and fleet admiral, Zheng He, arrived in his fourth and fifth voyage to the Somali cities of Mogadishu, Zeila, Merca and Berbera. Sa'id of Mogadishu, a Somali explorer, travelled to China in the 14th century, when China was ruled by the Yuan Dynasty, and noted the trading communities of the Chinese ports and cities.

=== Cold War era ===
==== Somali Democratic Government (1960–1969) ====
On 30 June 1960, Foreign Minister Chen Yi announced the recognition of the Somali Republic by the People's Republic of China. Official relations between the Somali and Chinese governments were established on 14 December 1960. Somalia and China later signed their first official trade agreement in June 1963.

During the Cold War period, the Somali government maintained active relations with its Chinese counterpart. The Somali government campaigned for an end to China's diplomatic isolation and supported instead its entry into the United Nations. The Sino-Soviet split had a large influence on China's relations with countries in Africa. As early as 1964, Somalia was described as the first major center of Sino-Soviet rivalry on the continent.

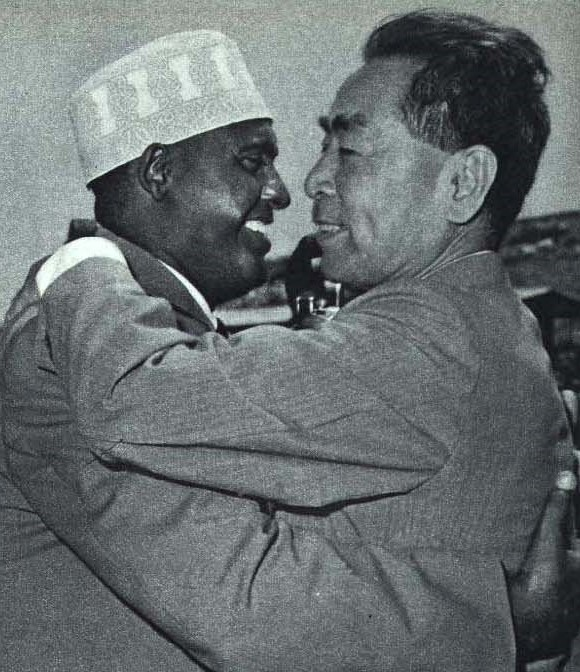
Zhou Enlai meeting with Abdirashid Ali Shermarke during his visit to Somalia in 1964.

==== Somali Democratic Republic 1969–1991 ====
By 1971, Chinese economic aid to Somalia far exceeded the Soviet Union.

When the Somali government expelled Soviet representatives in late 1977, China agreed to take over many of the development projects started by them. The Chinese government declared Somalia's decision to expel the Soviets as marking a, "another important victory in the struggle against hegemonism".

In the late 1970s the Chinese carried out and completed what was considered their second most ambitious project in Sub-Saharan Africa known as "The Somali North-South Road". The PRC also became involved in the construction of hospitals, factories and further extended large loans to Somalia.

China supported Somalia during the Ogaden War, which saw the Somali army and insurgents fighting for independence from Ethiopia face off against Soviet, Cuban and Ethiopian forces. However, Beijing offered only nominal military support to Mogadishu, instead focusing on taking over the efforts of abandoned Soviet projects. Following the war, China maintained a 3,000 man presence in Somalia.

=== Present-day ===
==== Somali Civil War ====
In January 1991, the Chinese embassy in Mogadishu closed down operations due to the start of the civil war in Somalia. Despite the departure of most Chinese officials, the two countries maintained a small trading relationship in the ensuing years. Total trade volume in 2002 was US$3.39 million, with Somalia exporting US$1.56 million of goods to China and importing $1.83 million.

From 2000 to 2011, approximately seven Chinese development projects were launched in Somalia. These initiatives included $6 million in economic assistance, donation of anti-malaria drugs, and $3 million in debt relief.

==== 2010s ====
Following the establishment of the Federal Government of Somalia in mid-2012, the Chinese authorities reaffirmed their support for the Somali government and called on the international community to strengthen its commitment to the Somali peace process. China's Permanent Representative to the UN, Li Baodong, also emphasized his administration's support for the Somali federal government's stabilization plan, including the latter's efforts at "implementing an interim Constitution, carrying out its six-point plan, strengthening institutional capacity, exercising government functions and extending effective authority over all its national territory."

In August 2013, follow a meeting with Chinese Vice Premier Wang Yang, Somalia's Foreign Minister Fowziya Yusuf Haji Adan announced that the Somali authorities looked forward to cooperation with the Chinese government in the energy, infrastructure, national security and agriculture sectors, among others. Wang also praised the traditional friendship between both nations and re-affirmed China's commitment to the Somali peace process.

In June 2014, during the Arab-China Summit in Beijing, Somali Foreign Minister Abdirahman Duale Beyle met with his Chinese counterpart Wang Yi to discuss bilateral cooperation between Somalia and China. The meeting was held at the Chinese foreign ministry center and focused on trade, security and reconstruction. Among the issues discussed were the various Chinese development projects that were in the process of being implemented in Somalia. Beyle also indicated that the Chinese authorities were slated to broaden their support for Somalia, which would serve to create new employment opportunities. Additionally, Wang commended the Somali federal government on its peace-building efforts. He likewise reaffirmed the historically close diplomatic ties between both territories, recalling China's recognition of the nascent Somali Republic in 1960 and Somalia's subsequent campaigning which helped China obtain a permanent seat in the United Nations Security Council. On 30 June 2014, Chinese Foreign Ministry spokesman Hong Lei announced that China would dispatch a diplomatic team on 1 July to reopen the Chinese embassy in Mogadishu. He described the move as both recognition that the Somali authorities were making progress in their national reconstruction efforts and a symbol of the importance that the Chinese government attaches to its bilateral relations with Somalia. On 3 July 2014, Chargé d'Affaires of the Embassy of the People's Republic of China Wei Hongtian presented his credentials to Foreign Minister of Somalia Abdirahman Duale Beyle at an event in the Somali capital. Beyle similarly hailed the appointment as a sign of the nation's strengthening security and foreign diplomatic relations. On 12 October 2014, the new Chinese embassy officially opened in Mogadishu.

Somalia joined the Belt and Road Initiative (BRI) in 2015.

==== 2020s ====
In July 2020, Somaliland established relations with Taiwan which also included the opening of representative offices in their respective countries. The Chinese foreign ministry claimed that Taiwan aimed to ""undermine Somalia's sovereignty and territorial integrity" and it opposes the two entities establishing ties.

As a result, in April 2025, Somalia implemented a ban on the entry and transit of all Republic of China passport holders, a move widely interpreted as aligning with the People's Republic of China's (PRC) foreign policy objectives. The decision, which took effect on 30 April, was communicated to the ROC Ministry of Foreign Affairs by Somalia's civil aviation authority and immediately drew protest from Taipei, which accused Beijing of pressuring Mogadishu. Somalia justified the policy by invoking United Nations General Assembly Resolution 2758 (1971), affirming the PRC as the sole legitimate representative of China, and reiterated its adherence to the "One China" principle. China welcomed the decision, with its Ministry of Foreign Affairs stating it "highly appreciates" Somalia's stance and reaffirming support for Mogadishu's claim over Somaliland.

== Sovereignty issues ==
Somalia follows the one China principle. It recognizes the People's Republic of China as the sole government of China and Taiwan as an integral part of China's territory, and supports all efforts by the PRC to "achieve national reunification". It also considers Hong Kong, Xinjiang and Tibet to be China's internal affairs.

In July 2019, UN ambassadors of 37 countries, including Somalia, signed a joint letter to the United Nations Human Rights Council defending China's persecution of Uyghurs. Somalia was one of 16 countries that defended China in 2019 but did not do so in 2020. In June 2020, Somalia was one of 53 countries that backed the Hong Kong national security law at the United Nations.

== Agreements ==
In July 2007, the Chinese state-owned oil company CNOOC also signed an oil exploration agreement with the Somali government over the north-central Mudug province, situated in the autonomous Puntland region.

In September 2013, both governments signed an official cooperation agreement in Mogadishu as part of a five-year national recovery plan in Somalia. The pact will see the Chinese authorities reconstruct several major infrastructural landmarks in the Somali capital and elsewhere, including the National Theatre, a hospital, and the Mogadishu Stadium, as well as the road between Galkayo and Burao in northern Somalia. Additionally, Chinese ambassador Liu Guangyoun indicated that China would re-open its embassy in Mogadishu on land that had been donated for the purpose by the Somali government.

In April 2015, Foreign Minister of Somalia Abdisalam Omer met in Mogadishu with Ambassador of China to Somalia Wei Hongtian to discuss ties between both nations. The meeting concluded with a signed bilateral agreement, which strengthens diplomatic relations and collaboration. As part of the treaty's stipulations, $13 million in Chinese funds will be earmarked for reconstruction and development initiatives in the economy, health, education and infrastructure sectors in Somalia. According to Ambassador Wei, the Chinese authorities are slated to continue their support for the Somali government's stabilizations efforts. Omer in turn commended the Chinese government for its sustained cooperation.

== List of Somali Ambassadors to China ==
Name	Appointed	Recalled	Notes
Ahmed Mohamed Darman	?	1975?	
Mohamed Hassan Said	1988	2005^{[A]}	
Mohamed Ahmed Awil	2005	2011	
Yusuf Hassan Ibrahim	2010	-	

^{A} Mohamed Hassan Said was appointed by the Siad Barre government and was stranded in Beijing when his government collapsed in 1991. The Chinese government continued to recognize him as the Somali ambassador until the Transitional Federal Government appointed a replacement in 2005.

== See also ==
- Foreign relations of China
- Foreign relations of Somalia
