= Japan–Somalia relations =

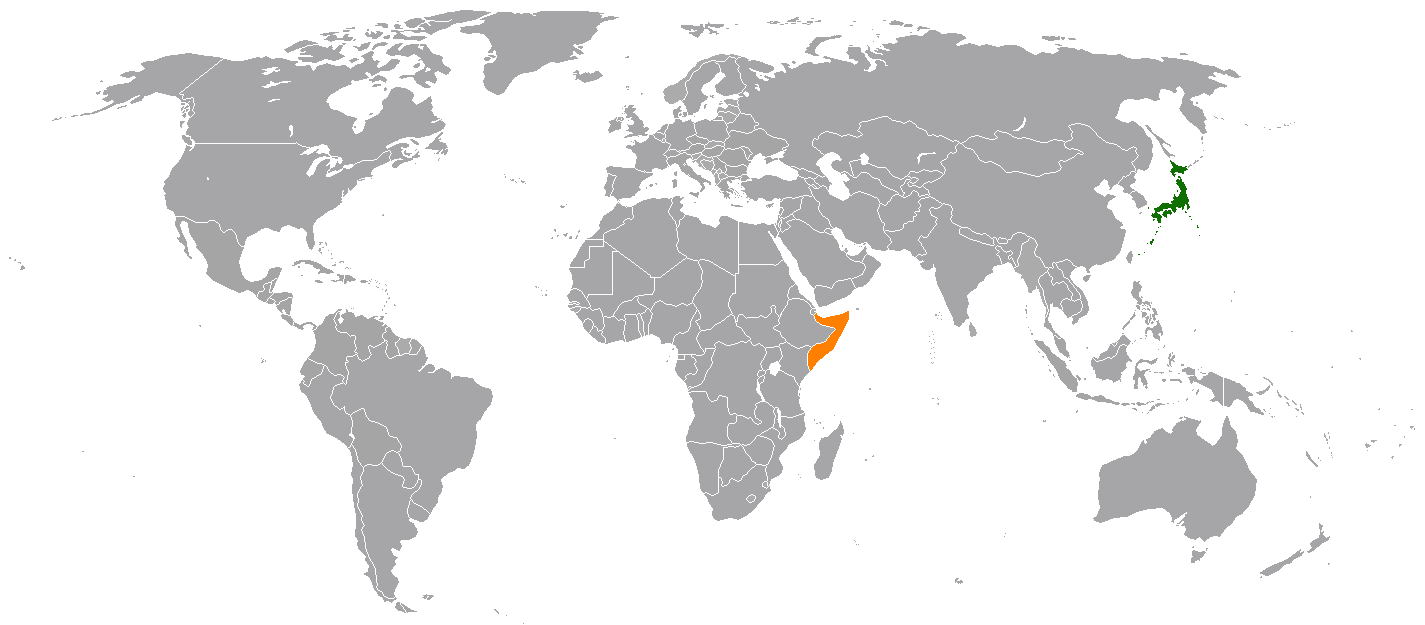
- Japan: Somalia

Japan–Somalia relations are bilateral relations between Japan and Somalia. Japan has a non resident ambassador in Nairobi.

== History ==
Diplomatic ties between Japan and Somalia were first established in 1960, concurrent with the Somali Republic's independence. In 1982, the Somali government established an embassy in Tokyo. It later closed down in 1990.

Following the start of the civil war in Somalia in 1991, the Japanese authorities pledged development funds through various international organizations. The subsequent establishment of the Federal Government of Somalia in August 2012 was welcomed by the Japanese authorities, who re-affirmed Japan's support for Somalia's government, its territorial integrity and sovereignty.

In 2013, Japanese Prime Minister Shinzo Abe also announced that Japan would resume direct assistance to Somalia, particularly in the areas of security, industrial development, and bilateral trade and investment.

== Agreements ==
In March 2014, President of Somalia Hassan Sheikh Mohamud and a Somali government delegation including the Minister of Foreign Affairs and International Cooperation Abdirahman Duale Beyle, Minister of Planning Said Abdullahi Mohamed and Minister of Public Works and Reconstruction Nadifo Mohamed Osman made a four-day visit to Tokyo, where they met with Ambassador Tatsushi Terada and other senior Japanese government officials. President Mohamud and his delegation also conferred with Prime Minister Shinzo Abe to discuss strengthening bilateral relations, and capacity training for Somali livestock and agricultural development professionals. Mohamud likewise met with Emperor Akihito, as well as with leaders of the Nippon Foundation, where they discussed project proposals in the agriculture, fisheries, marine resources and livestock sectors. Following a visit to the Japanese Coast Guard center and the Port of Yokohama, Mohamud requested Japanese assistance in development initiatives earmarked for Somalia's coastline. He also recommended at a gathering before the Japan National Press Club that Japanese investments in education should be refocused towards youth vocational education centres to ensure sustainability. The visit concluded with an announcement by Japanese Prime Minister Abe that his administration would put forth a $40 million funding package for the rehabilitation of Somalia's police forces, relief services, and job creation opportunities. The Japanese Speaker of Parliament Masaaki Yamasaki also pledged that his government would help reconstruct the Somali parliamentary compound, the People's Mansion, in Mogadishu. Mohamud commended the Japanese government for intensifying its bilateral support, and suggested that the development initiatives would be centered on vocational training for youth and women, maritime and fisheries training, fisheries and agricultural infrastructure development, and communication and information technology support.

== Diplomatic missions ==
Japan conducts diplomatic relations with Somalia through its embassy in Nairobi, Kenya.

In January 2014, Japan appointed Tatsushi Terada as the new ambassador to Somalia, replacing Atoshisa Takata. Ambassador Terada concurrently presented his credentials to the Somali President Hassan Sheikh Mohamud at a ceremony in Mogadishu.

== See also ==
- Foreign relations of Japan
- Foreign relations of Somalia
