= List of ambassadors of Somalia to China =

Coordinates: 39.944729°N 116.455513°E

Ambassador of Somalia to China
- Incumbent; Yusuf Hassan Ibrahim since January 16, 2012
- Inaugural holder: Ahmed Mohamed Darman
- Formation: 1972

The Somali Ambassador in Beijing is the official representative of the Government in Mogadishu to the Government of the People's Republic of China.

== List of representatives ==
Diplomatic agreement/designated/Diplomatic accreditation	Ambassador	Observations	List of prime ministers of Somalia	Premier of the People's Republic of China	Term end
December 27, 1960	Jeylani Ali Mohamed	The governments in Mogadishu and Beijing established diplomatic relations.	Abdirashid Ali Shermarke	Zhou Enlai	
1972	Ahmed Mohamed Darman	Dr. Mohamed Ahmed Darman (died in 2012, became ambassador of Somalia to Tanzania, Ethiopia and China and Consul General to New York and Yemen (Aden).: In 1963, he ran for parliamentary seat.	Siad Barre	Zhou Enlai	1974
1976	Fantaye Biftu		Siad Barre	Hua Guofeng	1981
November 15, 1977	Mohamed Ismail Kahin		Siad Barre	Hua Guofeng	1981
October 15, 1981	Sharif Salah Mohamed Ali		Siad Barre	Zhao Ziyang	
	Yusuf Hassan Ibrahim	'Yusuf Dheeg'	Siad Barre	Zhao Ziyang	
1988	Mohamed Hassan Said		Umar Arteh Ghalib	Li Peng	2002
January 16, 2012	Yusuf Hassan Ibrahim		Abdi Farah Shirdon	Wen Jiabao	

China–Somalia relations
