= Hassan Ugas Yasin =

Ugas Hassan Ugas Yasin اوغاس حسن اوغاس ياسين
- Ughaz of the Dishiishe
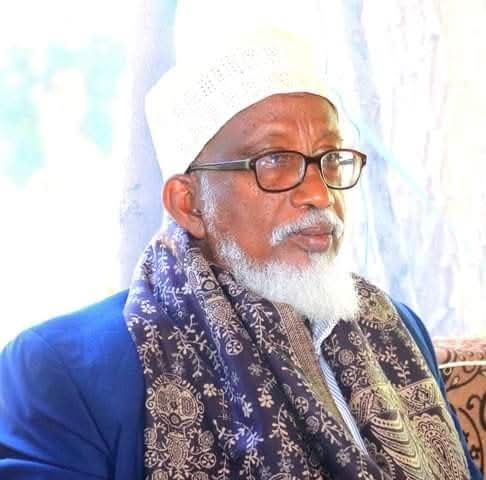
- Reign: 1 January 2001
- Coronation: 15 July 2001
- Predecessor: Ugas Yasin Ugas Abdurahman
- Born: Bosaso
- Religion: Islam

Ugas Hassan Ugas Yasin (Somali: Ugaas Xasan Ugaas Yaasiin, Arabic: اوغاس حسن اوغاس ياسين, is the supreme traditional clan elder (Ughaz) of Dishiishe clan. Ugas Hassan belongs to a dynastical line of succession that continued for centuries. On 15 July 2001 he was crowned, it's said the coronation was conducted at behest of his late father Ugas Yasin. Between 1974-90 he was in the service (army) holding the rank of colonel, in 1987 he went to Italy where he had joined the academy Cievieta Vecchia in Rome.

== Coronation ==
In 2002 Ugas Hassan was crowned in Andho-bahal valley near, Waaciye district in Bari region, in the attendance of a large folks including high-ranking dignitaries from the Somali region of Ogaden, Somaliland, Kenya, Somalia and Puntland.

Ugas is serving as the nominal chief Ugas for the Harti clans, which itself belongs to Darod family.

== Background ==
In 1983 Hassan graduated from Somali National University with an Economics degree. He fluently speaks Italian and fairly English.
