= Ismail Mahmud Hurre =

Somalian politician (1943–2023)

Ismail Mahmoud Hurre (Buubaa)
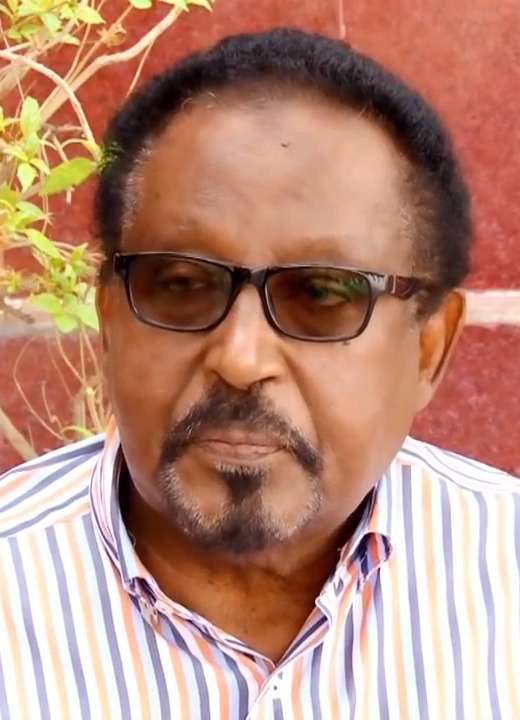

Minister of Finance (Somaliland)
- In office 1991–1993
- President: Abdirahman Ahmed Ali Tuur

Minister of Foreign Affairs (Somalia)
- In office 2000–2002
- President: Abdiqasim Salad Hassan

Minister of Regional Cooperation (Somalia)
- In office 2004–2005
- President: Abdullahi Yusuf Ahmed

Deputy Prime Minister and Minister of Foreign Affairs (Somalia)
- In office 21 August 2006 – 2007
- President: Abdullahi Yusuf Ahmed

Minister of Culture and Higher Education (Somalia)
- In office 2007–2008
- President: Abdullahi Yusuf Ahmed

Personal details
- Born: 1943 Maygaagta, near Hargeisa, British Somaliland
- Died: 5 April 2023 (aged 80) Ankara, Turkey
- Occupation: Politician

Ismail Mahmoud Hurre (Somali: Ismaaciil Maxamuud Hurre, Arabic: اسماعيل محمود حر; 1943 – 5 April 2023), nicknamed Buubaa, was a Somali politician who served first Minister of Finance of Somaliland and twice as Minister of Foreign Affairs of the Transitional Federal Government of Somalia.

== Biography ==
=== Early life ===
Buubaa was born in 1943 in the Maygaagta area on the outskirts of Hargeisa and spent the first four years of his life in the Aware region of Ethiopia. He received his early education in Borama, attending Qur’an school from 1947 to 1948 and the town’s first primary school from 1948 to 1951. He later studied at Cammuud Intermediate School between 1951 and 1955, followed by two years at Sheikh Secondary School (1955–1957). Afterward, he briefly worked as a teacher at Awbarre Primary School (1957–1958) and took the GG secondary examination in 1959.

After completing middle school at Cammuud, he attended the Hargeisa Teachers’ Training College (TTC) for two years and, in parallel, pursued a UK high-school qualification by correspondence while in Hargeisa, sitting the examination in 1959.

In 1961, he traveled to the United States for higher education, earning his bachelor's degree from the University of New Mexico. He returned to Somalia in 1965 and worked as an English teacher at Lafoole (NTEC) until 1967. That year, he went back to the United States, where he specialized in creative writing at Syracuse University, receiving his master's degree in 1969. Upon returning again to Somalia in 1969, he became the dean and a lecturer at Lafoole University College, heading the English Department until 1970.

After the Siad Barre coup in 1970, Buubaa refused to cooperate with the new government and returned to the United States. He resumed doctoral studies at Brandeis University, writing a dissertation on the history of ideas, and became Director of the university’s Transitional Year Program that same year. In 1971, he joined the University of New Hampshire as a faculty member in English. Between 1972 and 1973, he completed a second doctoral degree at Boston University with a dissertation related to his philosophical interests.

=== Early career ===
In 1974, he moved to Egypt and worked as a senior political analyst in the Political Department of the Arab League. However, in 1975, he resigned from the post due to pressure from the Somali government. The same year, he became an English lecturer at King Abdulaziz University in Saudi Arabia. From 1977 to 1984, he served as the managing director of MAFCO for Trade and Contracts, a Saudi-based trading company. In 1981, he took part in the founding of the Somali National Movement (SNM) and became an active member of its Central Council. In 1984, he joined another Saudi enterprise, QUADRICO, where he worked as managing director and economic adviser.

=== Somaliland's Re-Independence ===
Following the declaration of independence in 1991, Buubaa was appointed as the first Minister of Finance of the nascent government led by Abdirahman Ahmed Ali Tuur. According to Somali-language media, he helped organize Somaliland’s early fiscal administration and was associated with initial discussions on introducing a Somaliland shilling currency.

=== Transitional Federal Government of Somalia ===
Buubaa served as Somalia’s foreign minister from 2000 to 2002 under Abdiqasim Salad Hassan. During the September 11 attacks in 2001, he wrote promptly to the U.S. Secretary of State stating, "we support you, and we share your concern about the possibility that al-Qaeda may move into Somalia," though the United States prioritized Afghanistan and al-Qaeda there and was less engaged in restoring security in Somalia.

When the Transitional Federal Government of Somalia was established in 2004, Buubaa became one of its members. In December 2004, Buubaa was appointed Minister of Regional Cooperation. From 2004 to 2005, during the presidency of Abdullahi Yusuf Ahmed, he served as Minister of Regional Cooperation.

He served as Somalia’s foreign minister again from August 2006 to early 2007 under Abdullahi Yusuf Ahmed, and concurrently held the position of Deputy Prime Minister. In June 2006, he represented Somalia at the 33rd Islamic Conference of Foreign Ministers held in Baku, Azerbaijan. In November 2006, he met with the British Parliamentary Under-Secretary of State for Foreign, Commonwealth and Development Affairs David Triesman, Baron Triesman.

From 2007 to 2008, Buubaa served as Minister of Culture and Higher Education. In June 2007, serving as Minister of Education, Buubaa strongly denied wire reports that he intended to join an Asmara-based Eritrean group critical of Somalia’s federal government.

In July 2009, Buubaa was among five members expelled from the Transitional Federal Parliament of Somalia.

In July 2013, a non-governmental advisory political forum titled the "Council for National Unity and Strengthening Statehood" was launched in Mogadishu, and Buubaa was named its interim chairman.

=== Return to Somaliland ===
In June 2015, during an exclusive interview with Horn Cable Television in Dubai, United Arab Emirates, Buubaa stated his intention to return to Somaliland. In September 2015, Buubaa returned to Somaliland.

In September 2016, Buubaa criticized Somalia President Hassan Sheikh Mohamud, arguing that the 1960 union between Somaliland and Somalia had been ruined by former dictator Mohamed Siad Barre and "buried" in 2016 by the incumbent president. And he stated that the issue of Somaliland was not secession but the restoration of the independence it had obtained in the 1960s and that Somalia and Somaliland should aim to become cooperating brother-states.

In October 2016, Buubaa criticized the postponement of the Somaliland presidential election.

In June 2017, Buubaa attempted to depart from Egal International Airport but was prevented from leaving; the Somaliland Minister of Interior stated that this was because he had not obtained a Somaliland passport and tried to travel using a passport issued by the Federal Government of Somalia, and that his passport had been confiscated.

In 2018, President Muse Bihi Abdi mandated that mobile money transactions under US$100 be conducted in Somaliland shilling. Buubaa, who was a member of the opposition Waddani party, criticized the policy, arguing that it was intended to conceal the depletion of dollar reserves caused by the introduction of the Somaliland shilling during the administration of former president Ahmed Mohamed Mohamoud "Silanyo" and that it could negatively affect domestic businesses.

In March 2019, in an interview with Lebanon’s Al-Nashra media, he welcomed the Turkish government’s mediation between the Federal Government of Somalia and Somaliland.

In October 2020, Buubaa criticized the political structures of the three major parties in Somaliland — Kulmiye, Waddani, and UCID — arguing that their organizational frameworks resembled the former Somali socialist party under Mohamed Siad Barre.

In February 2021, ahead of the Somali presidential election (originally slated for 2021 but held in 2022), Buubaa publicly supported the re-election of incumbent Mohamed Abdullahi Farmaajo, though the contest was ultimately won by former president Hassan Sheikh Mohamud.

=== Death ===
Hurre died on 5 April 2023, in Ankara, Turkey, at the age of 80. Buubaa was given a state funeral in Hargeisa, which was attended by senior officials including Minister of Interior Mohamed Kahin Ahmed. He had been married to six women during his lifetime and was survived by eight children—five sons and three daughters. President Hassan Sheikh Mohamud of the Somali Federal Government and Prime Minister Hamza Abdi Barre also expressed their condolences following Buubaa’s death.
