= Ahmed Ibrahim Awale =

Somaliland environmentalist and author

- Born: 1954; Adadlay
- Education: Somali National University
- Occupations: Environmentalist, writer

Ahmed Ibrahim Awale (Somali: Axmed Ibraahim Cawaale) is a Somali environmentalist, and also an author. He is an environmentalist with more than several decades of experience. He is the chairman of the Somaliland Biodiversity Foundation, as well as Candlelight for Environment, Education, and Health. He also lectures on environmental science at the University of Hargeysa and is the author of several books, including Environment in Crisis: Selected Essays on the Somali environment.

Awale was born in the village of Adadlay, 95 km east of Hargeisa, and lived close to the mountain Gaan Libah. He was educated at the Somali National University.

He is president of the Somaliland Biodiversity Foundation and chair of the Somaliland organisation "Candlelight", which works in the fields of the environment, education and health. He is affiliated with the University of Hargeisa, and has written books in English on the archaeology and natural history of Somaliland, as well as works in Somali.

He is also known for his discovery of a new species of Aloe, Aloe sanguinalis, which he found growing wild near Alala Adka (Somali: Alaala Cadka) in 2014. The botanical author abbreviation Awale refers to him.

In 2020, a species of scorpion, Pandinurus awalei, was named in his honour.

He is also instrumental in the discovery and description of a new aloe species, Aloe kaysei, in Somaliland in March 2024.

== Works ==
- A Checklist of Somali Plant Names (first ed.). Hargeisa, Somaliland: Qalinmaal Publishers. 2025. ISBN 978-9198863901.
- Introduction to Plants in Central Somaliland (1st ed.). Redsea Cultural Foundation: Ponte Invisible. 2018. ISBN 978-8799520848.
- Tigaadda Tasawufka (first ed.). Copenhagen, Denmark: Liibaan Publishers. 2018. ISBN 978-8799520879.
- Environment in Crisis: Selected Essays on Somali Environment (Second ed.). Hargeysa. 2016. ISBN 978-8799520855.
- Maqaddinkii Xeebaha Berri-Soomaal: Taariikh-Nololeedkii Xaaji Sharma'arke Cali Saalax (1776-1861) (in Somali) (1st ed.). Copenhagen, Denmark: Liibaan Publishers. 2014. ISBN 978-8799520848.
- Sitaad: Is-dareen Gelinta Diineed ee Dumarka Soomaaliyeed (in Somali) (Somali ed.). Copenhagen, Denmark: Liibaan Publishers. 2013. ISBN 978-8799520848.
- Dirkii Sacmaallada (Volume 1) (Somali Edition) (in Somali) (Second ed.). Copenhagen, Denmark: Liibaan Publishers. 2013. ISBN 978-8799520848.
