= Jamal Mohamed Barrow =

Somalian diplomat

Jamal Mohamed Barrow جمال محمد بارو

Ambassador of Somalia to Nigeria
- Incumbent
- Assumed office 2 October 2019

Personal details
- Born: 29 November 1957 (age 68) Golweyn, Lower-shabelle
- Party: Peace and Development Party (Before 2016)
- Spouse(s): Su'ado Abdi Salah; Late Fadumo sharif Munye(AUN)
- Education: Somali National University; Moi University

Jamal Mohamed Barrow (Somali: Jamaal Maxamed Barrow, Arabic: جمال محمد بارو) is a diplomat from Somalia. He was born in Golweyn, a village in lower Shabelle region, Somalia, on 1 July 1957. He has married with a number of children. He gained his first degree in Journalism in the Faculty of Journalism of the Somalia National University in 1984 and he did his second degree in Business Administration in Moi University in Nairobi, Kenya, in 2006. Barrow is the Ambassador of Somalia to Nigeria, based at the Somali embassy in Nigeria. In October 2019, he was appointed as the new Somali Ambassador to the Federal Republic of Nigeria. He became the first ambassador accredited to Nigeria since the collapse of the central government of Somalia in 1991. Mr. Barrow was Somalia's Deputy Foreign Affairs minister between December 2012 and November, 2013.

Professionally, from 1995 to 2020, he held a number of positions which include

- Peace building and conflict resolution, and civic education trainer: In this sector, he

facilitated numerous sessions of workshops on peace building and conflict resolution, leadership, gender & development, team building, community development and mobilization, project management, entrepreneurship, fundraising, Participatory Rural Appraisal (PRA), ToT, project evaluation and monitoring, strategic planning, board management, human rights and democracy, networking, and customer services given to various Somali Society organizations including, community elders, local authorities, teachers, youth groups, parliament members, women groups like Coalition of Grass-root Women organizations, SAACID Voluntary Organization, and CORD as well as other NGOs/CBOs and networks

- Consultant management: In 2002, Ambassador Barrow established his own consultant

firm called Center for Training and Consultancy (CTC). The center's focus was on proving with consultant and training services to both governmental and nongovernmental institutions. From 2002 – 2011, CTC established working relationship with a various international and local organizations including UN agencies

- In 2011, in response to a request from the then transitional government, Ambassador

Barrow developed a concept on establishing the NATIONAL Disaster Management Authority and the idea had been accepted by the then President, Mr. Sharif Sheikh Ahmed and his prime minister, Mr Abdiweli Ahmed Gas. Then, Ambassador Barrow was mandated to translate the concept into workable organizational document. Then, the disaster management authority was officially launched in the end of 2011. Ambassador Barrow was appointed the deputy chair of the entity. Later, in 2017, the Disaster Management Authority was promoted to ministerial level, becoming Ministry of Humanitarian and Disaster Management of the Federal Republic of Somalia

- By mid of 2012, Ambassador Barrow shifted to politics and he became member of the

spearheading team of the presidential election campaign of Mr. Hassan Sheikh, who succeeded in the presidential contest in the 2012. In October 2012, Mr. Hassan took over the power from Mr. Sharif Sheikh Ahmed. In Hassan Sheikh's government, Ambassador Barrow was appointed as the deputy minister of the Foreign Affairs and he was holding this position only for one year. In August 2014, President Hassan Sheikh appointed Ambassador Barrow as his advisor on the parliament and cabinet affairs. In April 2015, the cabinet approved that Ambassador Barrow to be the second ambassador that government of Somalia sent to the Republic of South Africa and had been there for four years. During the four year, Ambassador Barrow also was in charge seven other countries in the southern Africa region as a non-resident ambassador. In October 2019, he was appointed as the new Somali Ambassador to the Federal Republic of Nigeria. He became the first ambassador accredited to Nigeria since the collapse of the central government of Somalia in 1991.

Networking and Participation conference and seminars

Since 1995 Ambassador Jamal Mohamed Barrow became part of several international and national networks in which he played significant roles. He had also participated in a number of international forums and seminars.
