= Sixth Clan =

Omen's network active in Somali politics

The Sixth Clan is a women's network active in Somali politics founded by Asha Haji Elmi. The name stems from the fact that traditionally Somalia's society is said to consist of five major clans. The "sixth clan" is the pan-Somali women's movement.

The movement stems from the earlier organization founded by Asha Haji Elmi, Save Somali Women and Children (SSWC), and grew out of a group of women with cross-clan marriages.

I was divided in two. My birth clan rejected me because my husband was from a clan they were fighting. My husband's clan considered me a spy and a stranger. Where do I belong? I realized the only identity no one could take away from me was being a woman. My only clan is womanhood.

In 2002, she led a group of women to the Somali Peace and Reconciliation conference in Eldoret, Kenya. There, the "sixth clan" was officially recognized, and women representatives were allowed to officially participate in the discussions.

This political activism led the Transitional Federal Government (TFG) to adopt in the Transitional Federal Charter (TFC) a quota of 12% of the 275 seats in the Transitional Federal Parliament (TFP) to be reserved for women. While that should result in 33 seats, only 8% of the seats awarded were granted to women.
