= Abdisalam Abdi Ali =

Somali politician and Minister of Foreign Affairs

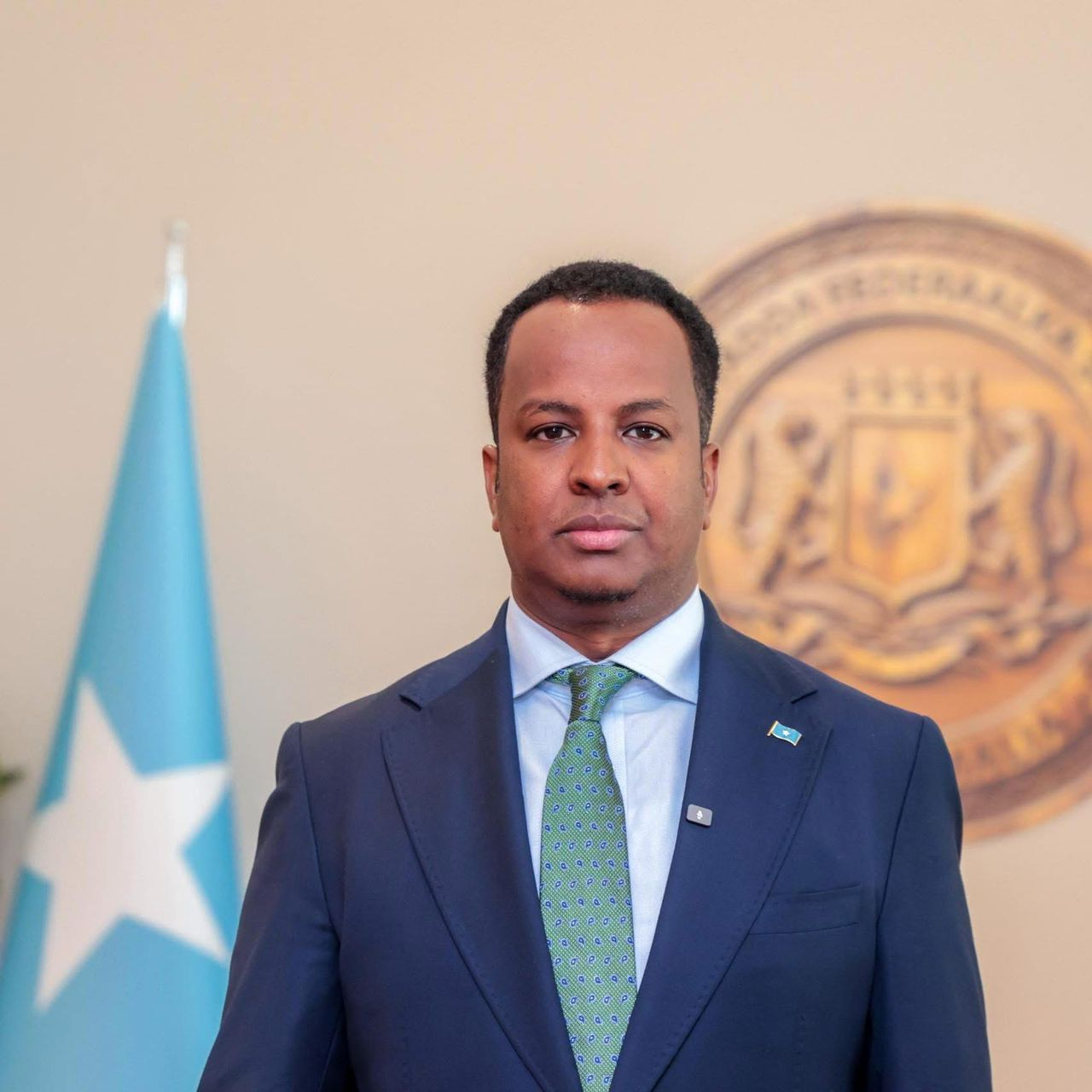
- Abdisalam in 2025

Ministry of Foreign Affairs of Somalia
- Incumbent
- Assumed office 27 April 2025
- President: Hassan Sheikh Mohamud
- Prime Minister: Hamza Abdi Barre
- Preceded by: Ahmed Moalim Fiqi

Second Deputy Prime Minister of Somalia
- Succeeded by: Jibril Abdirashid Haji Abdi

Minister of Public Works, Reconstruction & Housing
- Succeeded by: Dr. Elmi Mohamud Nur

Member of the Federal Parliament of Somalia
- Incumbent
- Assumed office 10 April 2022

Personal details
- Party: Mideeye

Abdisalam Abdi Ali is a Somali politician who currently serves as the Minister of Foreign Affairs and International Cooperation of Somalia since 2025. He had served earlier as the Deputy Prime Minister before appointment to this position and has held several senior government roles, including Minister of Public Works. He is also a member of Somalia's 11th Federal Parliament.

== Career ==
Abdisalam Abdi Ali officially assumed office as the Minister of Foreign Affairs on 27 April 2025 Since his assumption of office, he has spearheaded diplomatic renewal efforts geared toward strengthening Somalia's bilateral and multilateral partnerships.

Before being appointed Foreign Minister, Abdisalam served as Deputy Prime Minister responsible for the government's programmes on governance, infrastructure, and socioeconomic development. He previously held the portfolio of Minister of Public Works, Reconstruction, and Housing and contributed to the national reconstruction and institutional development process.

He was a member of the Committee for Agriculture, Livestock, and Fisheries during the 11th Federal Parliament, and he contributed to policymaking processes on sustainable development and agriculture.

== Foreign Minister of Somalia ==
Since his appointment to the post in 2025, Abdisalam has represented Somalia in a wide range of diplomatic engagements. Among other instances, he has discussed the expansion of bilateral cooperation with Türkiye, met with Pakistani officials in Brussels with the view to strengthening ties, and participated in high-level meetings with Southeast Asian nations in Jakarta.

He has also played his role in advancing the relations between Somalia and African and Middle Eastern countries: reiterating Somalia's stand on Morocco's territorial integrity, holding bilateral discussions in Rwanda, and meeting Qatar's ambassador for deeper cooperation.

On the multilateral front, he represented Somalia at the EU Indo-Pacific Ministerial Forum, and afterwards went to Beijing to meet with Chinese officials on cooperation and international engagement.

He also met separately with diplomats representing Italy, Venezuela, and Serbia.
