= Ministry of Foreign Affairs (Somalia) =

Government ministry of Somalia

Coordinates: 2°2′24″N 45°20′46″E

Federal Republic of Somalia Ministry of Foreign Affairs of Somalia
- Wasaaradda Arrimaha Dibedda iyo Iskaashiga Caalamiga
- Coat of arms of Somalia

Ministry and International Cooperation overview
- Formed: 1956; 70 years ago
- Jurisdiction: Somalia
- Headquarters: Bondhere, Banaadir, Mogadishu (Somalia)
- Minister responsible: Abdisalam Abdi Ali, Minister
- Deputy Minister responsible: Isaak Mohamud Mursal
- Website: www.mfa.gov.so

The Ministry of Foreign Affairs and International Cooperations (Somali: Wasaaradda Arrimaha Dibedda iyo xiriirka caalamiga ah ee Jamhuuriyada Federaalka Soomaaliya) is the Somali government ministry which oversees the foreign relations of Somalia. The current minister is Abdisalam Abdi Ali.

The agency is responsible for formulating foreign policies, decisions, foreign affairs documents, and statements regarding the FRS. It also negotiates and signs bilateral and multilateral foreign treaties and agreements. The agency also dispatches foreign affairs representatives to other countries.

It represents Somalia's interests in United Nations conferences, inter-governmental meetings, and the activities of international organizations. MOFA advises the central government in formulating diplomatic strategies, guidelines, and policies.

== Organization ==
- Minister
- Deputy Minister
- Permanent Secretary
- The Department of Policy Planning
- The Department of African Affairs
- The Department of Asian and Pacific Affairs
- The Department of Middle East and North African (MENA) Affairs
- The Department of European Affairs
- The Department of Americas Affairs
- The Department of International Organizations and Conferences
- The Department of Legal Affairs
- Section For international Law & Treaties
- The Protocol Department
- The Department of Consular Affairs
- Section of Diplomatic Relations
- The Administrative Department and Planning
- Section of Personnel
- Section of Diplomatic Institute
- Section of Planning and Coordination
- The Department of Communication
- The Department of Maritime and Ocean Affairs
- Section of Climate and Environment
- Section of Aviation, Border and Institute
- The Department of Economic and Trade
- Section of Investment Promotion
- The Department of External Security Affairs
- The Department of Finance
- Section of Asset Management
- The Bureau of Archives
- The Department of Diaspora

== List of ministers ==
This is a list of ministers of foreign affairs of Somalia:

- 1960–1964: Abdullahi Issa Mohamud
- 1964–1967: Ahmed Yusuf Dualeh
- 1967–1969: Muhammad Haji Ibrahim Egal
- 1969: Haji Farah Ali Omar
- 1969–1976: Umar Arteh Ghalib
- 1976–1977: Muhammad Siad Barre
- 1977–1987: Abdirahman Jama Barre
- 1987–1988: Muhammad Ali Hamoud
- 1988–1989: Muhammad Siad Barre
- 1989–1990: Abdirahman Jama Barre
- 1990: Ali Ahmed Jama Jangali
- 1990–1991: Ahmed Mohamed Adan
- 1991–1992: Muhammad Ali Hamoud
- 2000–2002: Ismail Mahmud Hurre
- 2002–2004: Yusuf Hassan Ibrahim
- 2004–2006: Abdullahi Sheikh Ismail
- 2006–2007: Ismail Mahmud Hurre
- 2007: Hussein Elabe Fahiye
- 2007–2008: Muhammad Ali Hamoud
- 2008–2009: Ali Ahmed Jama Jangali
- 2009: Mohamed Abdullahi Omaar
- 2009–2010: Ali Ahmed Jama Jangali
- 2010: Yusuf Hassan Ibrahim
- 2010–2011: Mohamed Abdullahi Omaar
- 2011–2012: Mohamed Mohamud Ibrahim
- 2012: Abdullahi Haji Hassan Mohamed Nuur
- 2012–2014: Fawzia Yusuf Adam
- 2014–2015: Abdirahman Beyle
- 2015–2017: Abdusalam H. Omer
- 2017–2018: Yusuf Garaad Omar
- 2018–2020: Ahmed Isse Awad
- 2020–2021: Mohamed Abdirizak Mohamud
- 2021–2022: Abdisaid Muse Ali
- 2022–2023: Abshir Omar Huruse
- 2024–2025: Ahmed Moalim Fiqi
- 2025–present: Abdisalam Abdi Ali

== See also ==
- Foreign relations of Somalia
- List of diplomatic missions of Somalia
- List of diplomatic missions in Somalia
