= Asha Jama =

Somali-Canadian social activist, TV reporter and journalist

Asha Said Jama عائشة سعيد جامع
- Born: November 15, 1960 (age 65); Merca, Somalia
- Citizenship: Canadian
- Education: Somali National University
- Occupations: activist, journalist

Asha Said Jama (Somali: Caasha Saciid Jamaac, Arabic: عائشة سعيد جامع) (born on November 15, 1960) is a Somali-Canadian social activist, and former TV reporter and journalist.

== Biography ==
Jama was born in Merca, situated in southern Somalia. She grew up in the capital Mogadishu. There, she attended the Somali National University's Lafoole Campus and obtained a degree in journalism. Soon after graduation, Jama began working at the state-run Xidigta Oktobar newspaper. She later served as a news anchor on local television.

Due to civil unrest in Somalia, Jama decided to leave the country in the late 1980s. She moved to Canada, where she has been residing for the last twenty two years. Jama later became a community activist as President of the Calgary-based Alberta Somali Community Center. In this capacity, she has led numerous social initiatives, working closely with the Canadian Somali Congress among other organizations.

== See also ==
- Hanan Ibrahim
- Hawa Abdi
- Fatima Jibrell
