= Ali Said Faqi =

Somali toxicologist and diplomat

- Born: Somalia
- Education: Somali National University (DVM); University of Milan (Diploma of Specialization in Experimental Pharmacology); University of Leipzig (Ph.D)
- Occupations: scientist, politician
- Title: Ambassador of Somalia to Belgium and the European Union

Ali Said Faqi (Somali: Cali Saiid Fakhi, Arabic: علي سعيد فقي) is a Somali scientist specializing in toxicology and a diplomat. A leading researcher in his field, he has numerous scientific papers and also authored a book entitled A Comprehensive Guide to Toxicology in Preclinical Drug Development. In 2013, he was appointed as the Somali Ambassador to Benelux and European Union.

He is the Somali Ambassador to Belgium, Netherlands, Luxembourg (Benelux) and EU since June 2013. He served as the Somali Ambassador to France until November 2016. He is also the Somali Representative to ACP in Belgium, UNESCO in Paris and the Organization for the Prevention of Chemical Weapons (OPCW) in the Hague-Netherlands. Dr. Faqi served as an Interim Chief of Staff for the President Mohamed Abdullahi Farmajo during the transition period (February- Early April, 2017).

He is an Adjunct Associate Professor at Wayne State University, School of medicine, Department of OBGYN in Detroit, Michigan and an Associate Editor of the Journal of Reproductive Toxicology, one of the most prestigious journal in the field.

Dr. Faqi was a Sr. Director of the Department of Developmental and Reproductive Toxicology at MPI Research from June 2003- April 2017; a Research Institute specialized in conducting Nonclinical Research for Drugs and Vaccines used for Human Health. Dr. Faqi is a noted scientist in the fields of birth defects and reproduction. In his 14 years tenure at MPI Research, Dr. Faqi built the Department from scratch and turned it into a globally known Department. As a Toxicologist, his scientific contributions mainly focused on saving lives and support people's health worldwide.

Dr. Faqi holds a doctor's degree in Veterinary Medicine from the Somali National University, Diploma of Specialization in Experimental Pharmacology from the University of Milan and a PhD in Toxicology from the University of Leipzig. He is a Diplomate of American Board of Toxicology (DABT) and a Fellow Academy of Toxicological Sciences (FATS). Furthermore, he served as:

- Board of Scientific Counselors (BOSC) Computational Toxicology at the United States Environmental Protection Agency (US EPA) from September, 2009-September, 2010.
- A member of Scientific Advisory Board of the Alzheimer's Art Quilt Initiative (AAQI). An NGO dedicated in finding therapy for Alzeihmer disease.
- Chairman of the membership committee of the Teratology Society
- Chairman of the Education committee of the Teratology Society
- President of Michigan Society of Toxicology.
- Vice-president, President and past President of Toxicologists of African Origin, a special interest group within the society of toxicology
- A member of a Committee of Diverse Initiative (CDI) of the Society of Toxicology.
- Visiting Professor at the University of Palermo, Italy 2005–2011.
- Guest Professor at King Fahd Medical Research Center in King Abdiaziz University, Jeddah (Saudi Arabia) where he lectured on Preclinical Toxicology- November, 2009.
- Guest Editor: System Biology in Reproductive Medicine; volume 58 (1) (2012).

Dr. Faqi is also ad hoc scientific reviewer for the following Scientific Journals:

- Reproductive Toxicology
- Regulatory Pharmacology and Toxicology
- Toxicology Journal
- System Biology in Reproductive Medicine
- Pesticide Biochemistry and Physiology
- Birth Defects Research Part B: Developmental & Reproductive Toxicology
- Cell Biology and Toxicology
- Animal Reproduction Science
- Saudi Journal of Biological Sciences
- Drug and Chemical Toxicology
- PLoS ONE

He is an Editor of 2 Books:

- Comprehensive Guide in Toxicology in Nonclinical Drug Development- Second Edition published in mid-November, 2016. This book has earned a great reputation following the publication of the first edition in November, 2012.
- Developmental and Reproductive Toxicology, Part of the Methods in Pharmacology and Toxicology series (In press- Publication Date September 2017).

Dr. Faqi has published over 200 scientific papers including manuscripts, abstracts and scientific reports and authored/co-authored over 15 book chapters. He has lectured across the globe including USA, Europe, Japan, South Korea, India, Saudi Arabia and Somalia. He received several scientific and service awards from various institutions.

Dr. Faqi is a full member of the Society of Toxicology and Teratology.

== Education ==
- D.V.M degree - Somali National University
- Diploma of Specialization in experimental Pharmacology - University of Milan
- Ph.D. - University of Leipzig
