= Asha Haji Elmi =

Somali politician and peace activist

- Caasha Xaaji Cilmi عائشة حاجي علمي
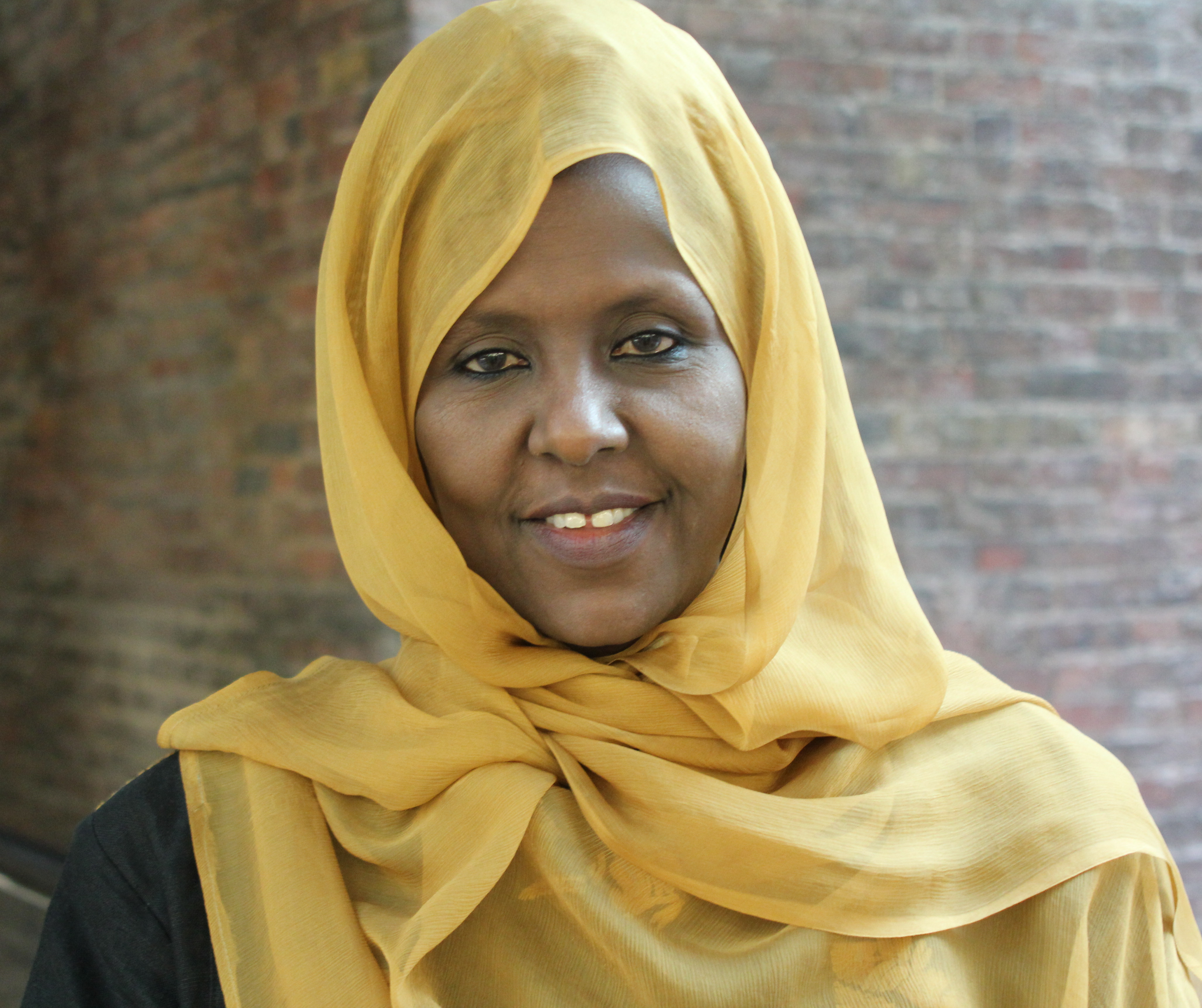
- Born: 1962 (age 63–64); Somalia
- Education: Somalia National University; US International University
- Occupation: peace activist
- Spouse: Abdi Farah Shirdon Saaid
- Awards: Right Livelihood Award (2008); Clinton Global Citizen Award (2009)

Asha Haji Elmi (Somali: Caasha Xaaji Cilmi, Arabic: عائشة حاجي علمي) (born 1962) is a Somali politician and peace activist. As of August 2012, she is a former member of the Federal Parliament of Somalia.

== Background ==
Elmi was born in 1962 in Somalia. She hails from the Saleebaan sub-clan of the Habar Gidir.

For her post-secondary education, Elmi earned a degree in economics from the Somali National University. She also holds a Master of Business Administration from the US International University.

Elmi is married to Abdi Farah Shirdon Saaid, a prominent entrepreneur and the former Prime Minister of Somalia.

== Career ==
=== Peace activism ===
In the 2000s, Elmi formed the Sixth Clan women's movement to advance female participation in Somali politics. She was later selected to the Transitional Federal Parliament (TFP) on August 29, 2004, and served until 2009.

Elmi is also the founder of Save Somali Women and Children (SSWC), created in 1992 during the height of the Somali Civil War.

Additionally, Asha has been acknowledged internationally for her activism against female circumcision (FGC) in Somalia and in other areas. She frequently travels to college campuses and universities around the world giving speeches about local political conditions and the effects of FGC.

=== Federal Parliament ===
In August 2012, Elmi was selected as a legislator in the Federal Parliament of Somalia.

== Awards ==
Elmi has received numerous awards for her peace work. In 2008, she became a recipient of the Right Livelihood Award "for continuing to lead at great personal risk the female participation in the peace and reconciliation process in her war-ravaged country". In September 2009, she was also among five nominees that were presented the Clinton Global Citizen Award.
