= Abdisalam Hadliye =

Somali economist and politician

Abdisalam Omer Hadliye عبد السلام عمر
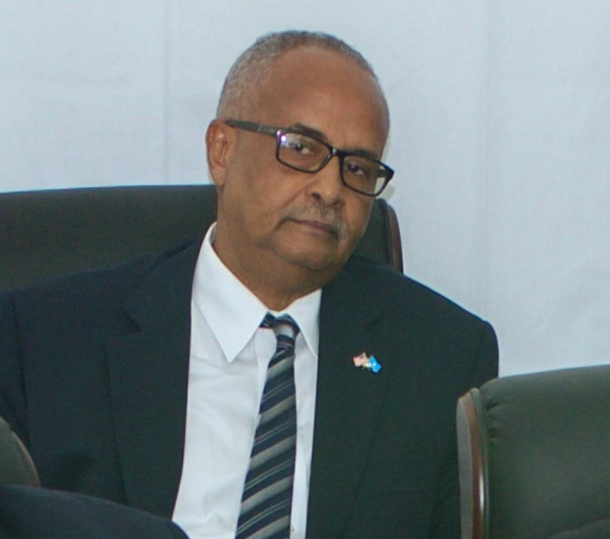

Minister of Foreign Affairs
- In office 27 January 2015 – 29 March 2017
- President: Hassan Sheikh Mohamud
- Prime Minister: Omar Abdirashid Ali Sharmarke
- Preceded by: Abdirahman Duale Beyle
- Succeeded by: Yusuf Garaad Omar

Governor of the Central Bank of Somalia
- In office 17 January 2013 – 13 September 2013
- President: Hassan Sheikh Mohamud
- Preceded by: Abdillahi Hagi Jama Ali

Chief Business Officer for the District of Columbia Public Schools
- In office February 2007 – January 2013

Director of the UNDP Somalia Financial Services and Governance Program
- In office February 2002 – 2006

Chief of Staff at the Executive Office of the Mayor of the District of Columbia
- In office April 1999 – 2001

Personal details
- Born: 1954 or 1955 (age 71–72) Borama, British Somaliland (now Somaliland)
- Party: Independent
- Education: Boston College; Oklahoma State University; University of Tennessee

Abdisalam Omer Hadliye (Somali: Cabdisalaan Cumar Hadliye; Arabic: عبد السلام عمر), also known as Abdisalan Hadliye Omar, is a Somali economist and politician. He was previously a Chief of Staff at the Executive Office of the Mayor of the District of Columbia, a Director of the UNDP Somalia Financial Services and Governance Program, and a Chief Business Officer for the District of Columbia Public Schools. He also served as Governor of the Central Bank of Somalia in 2013. He served as the Minister of Foreign Affairs of Somalia from 27 February 2015 to 29 March 2017.

== Personal life ==
Omer Hadliye's family hails from the northwestern Awdal region of Somaliland. He hails from the Gadabuursi clan.

At the age of 16, Omer Hadliye moved to the United States. For his post-secondary education, he studied at Boston College, where he earned a Bachelor of Science in Economics in 1977. Four years later, he completed a Master of Arts in Public Administration at the Oklahoma State University. Omer Hadliye subsequently taught American politics, public and personnel administration, budgeting and program evaluation to undergraduates at the University of Tennessee. Concurrently, he earned a Ph.D. in Public Administration from the institution in 1986.

Omer Hadliye holds dual Somali and American citizenship.

== Career ==
=== Early career ===
In 1987, Omer served as a research associate with ACRC Systems based in New York City. He then relocated to Washington, D.C., in 1989, where he was an international student advisor on immigration and naturalization issues at Southeastern University. Omer subsequently joined the Prince William County capital improvement projects, where he worked over three years as a management and budget analyst. He was likewise a consultant in international finance to the World Bank's Africa Region for a short period.

=== District of Columbia ===
In 1992, Omer Hadliye began serving as a senior budget analyst for public safety and education at the Washington, D.C. Budget Office. He later was a team leader for public education at the CFO's office, and then as the chief financial officer for the District of Columbia Public Schools after August 1996.

In May 1997, Omer was appointed deputy chief financial officer of the Washington, D.C. government. His duties therein included managing a yearly budget of $2 billion in addition to a $6 billion operating budget. He also formulated developed comprehensive policy and budget analysis, advanced format and process reforms, and achieved balanced budgets for three straight years.

In April 1999, Omer Hadiye was named chief of staff at the municipality. He oversaw 75 senior personnel at the Executive Office of the Mayor, supervising a staff of more than 28,000. He also provided guidance and support to the agency directors and deputy mayors, maintained political relations with Congress and the Council, fielded concerns of local constituents, liaised with the national media, and developed performance benchmarks, strategic planning, and other aspects of the overall policy agenda of the District of Columbia.

=== World Bank and UNDP ===
From 2001 to 2002, Omer served as an expert consultant in municipal finances in the World Bank's East Asia and Pacific region cluster. He therein trained the municipal authorities in Shanghai on bond issues.

Between 2002 and 2006, Omer Hadliye began serving as the head of the United Nations Development Program's Governance and Financial Services Program (GFS) in Somalia's autonomous northern Puntland and Somaliland regions. The program entailed training in tax collection, government budget and financial management, and allocating land management and establishing urban planning and design units vis-a-vis select cities in conjunction with UNHABITAT. Additionally, Omer founded the UNDP's first program in support of money transfer businesses. The initiative aimed at buttressing growth of the local private sector. He also provided economic consultancy for the Somalian government, and trained more than 100 financial analysts through the UN/World Bank's LICUS program. Omer likewise spearheaded the establishment of a new public administration institute. He concurrently helped establish the training programs of the Mogadishu-based SIMAD University.

=== DCPS chief business officer ===
In February 2007, Hadliye was appointed the chief business officer for the District of Columbia Public Schools (DCPS). He in this capacity facilitated strategic planning and oversaw a support service network, the latter of which included facilities management, information systems, procurement, security, food service and real property management.

With three decades of experience in the economic field, Omer Hadliye specializes in financial and strategic planning, economic governance, and public sector reform.

=== Central Bank of Somalia ===
On 17 January 2013, Hadliye was appointed the new Governor of the Central Bank of Somalia by incumbent President Hassan Sheikh Mohamud. His duties include restructuring the monetary authority.

In order to facilitate the task of post-conflict reconstruction and development, Omer Hadliye announced in May 2013 that the Central Bank would replace the provisional licences it is issuing to commercial banks with full licenses by the end of the year. The provisional licences are intended to familiarize commercial banks with the general banking regulations, including anti-money laundering rules, that must be complied with once full licences are issued. Several foreign banks are reportedly already interested in acquiring the permits.

For policy making, Omer Hadliye also indicated that the Central Bank was collecting data to ascertain price levels and other indicators related to the growing informal economy.

Additionally, he announced that the Somali government was planning on releasing a new currency to replace the Somali shilling. The shilling had strengthened by around 80% after the eviction of insurgents from Mogadishu in 2011. However, it was in short supply since it was last printed prior to 1991. The International Monetary Fund is expected to provide support in this endeavour, as it formally recognized the Somali government in April 2013.

Hadliye also stated that the Central Bank would resume debt sales after a period of around 24 months, including treasury bills.

In July 2013, the UN Monitoring Group on Somalia and Eritrea (SEMG) alleged that 80 percent of withdrawals from the Central Bank of Somalia were made for private purposes. While acknowledging that the new national leadership presented an opportunity for change, the panel also suggested that the Bank was operating as a patronage system for government officials. The report alleged that Omer Hadliye was at the center of the purported irregularities, arguing that he made all banking decisions in the absence of a board and that the Bank was not subject to the legislature or government oversight institutions. Omer Hadliye described the charges as an attempt to discredit the nation's budding financial institutions and him personally as the new Governor of the Central Bank, and called for an audit by Transparency International. Additionally, he indicated that most of the funds that the panel alleged were missing had been deposited in a Finance Ministry account at the Central Bank, while the rest had been deposited in an account that a former prime minister had established for regional relations. According to Omer Hadliye, the bank deposits had been made with the assistance and signatures of PricewaterhouseCoopers (PWC) representatives. The president's office concurrently issued a statement rejecting the allegations, indicating that they dated from a previous administration. Shortly afterwards, the Somali authorities hired forensic accountants from FTI Consulting, Inc. and a legal team from the US firm Shulman, Rogers, Gandal, Pordy & Ecker, PA to investigate the charges. In September 2013, the Somali government announced that the auditors had found that the methodology and conclusions of the SEMG report's Annex 5.2 were "deeply flawed and entirely unreliable." The auditing firms consequently recommended the removal of the section of the SEMG's report containing corruption allegations. They also requested that the United Nations Security Council publicly sanction the SEMG for failing to adhere to and apply the UN's internal fact-finding standards.

Hadliye was shocked by the allegations. He recalls his past job in Washington and how he typically was the one calling out financial mismanagement. "I don't know if anybody knows the magnitude of problems at D.C. public schools. It's mind-boggling," he told The Washington Post in 2007, after he had been named chief business operations officer.

"He denies the U.N. monitoring group's claim that the central bank funds went missing at all, but particularly on his watch."

"During the period they claim funds were missing, I was not the governor and I was not part of the government," he said in an interview.

On 13 September 2013, Omer Hadliye resigned as governor of the Central Bank of Somalia a few hours after the presidential office informed him that changes would be made at the institution. He was succeeded at the position by Yussur A.F. Abrar. She is the first woman to be appointed as the Central Bank's governor.

=== Minister of Foreign Affairs of Somalia ===
==== Appointment ====
On 27 January 2015, Hadliye was appointed Minister of Foreign Affairs of Somalia by new prime minister Omar Abdirashid Ali Sharmarke. He succeeded Abdirahman Duale Beyle at the position. On 14 February, Hadliye formally assumed office at a handover ceremony at the foreign ministry compound in Mogadishu. Beyle therein noted his various accomplishments during his tenure, and enjoined the foreign ministry personnel to assist the incoming minister. Hadliye in turn commended Beyle for the latter's diplomatic work, and pledged to fulfill his own duties in accordance with the Constitution.

==== Somalia-Djibouti bilateral cooperation ====
In February 2015, Foreign Minister Hadliye met with the Ambassador of Djibouti to Somalia Dayyib Doubad Robleh at his office in Mogadishu. Foreign ministry department directors and Djibouti delegates also attended the gathering. The two statesmen therein discussed various bilateral matters, notably the Djibouti Armed Forces contingent within AMISOM, which was stationed in Beledweyne and other parts of the Hiraan province. Hadliye also saluted the Djiboutian government for its political and military support.

==== Summit of Arab Foreign Ministers ====
In March 2015, Foreign Minister Hadliye traveled to Cairo, Egypt to attend the Summit of Arab Foreign Ministers. He met therein with his counterparts over bilateral relations between Somalia and other Arab League nations. The conference focused on the political situation in Somalia, Libya, Yemen, Syria and Palestine. Hadliye and the other foreign ministers therein agreed on a draft resolution to establish a joint military force, which will be coordinated by the Arab League's Joint Defence Council. It was followed in late March by another summit for the Arab heads of states.

==== Somalia-Djibouti-Ethiopia trilateral agreement ====
In March 2015, Hadliye met with senior government officials in Djibouti. He therein signed a trilateral agreement stipulating that the governments of Somalia, Djibouti and Ethiopia would enhance their support for the Somali federal government-led security operations against the Al-Shabaab militant group. The official visit was Hadliye's first as Foreign Minister.

==== Somalia-Qatar bilateral cooperation ====
In March 2015, Hadliye was part of Federal Government of Somalia delegation to Doha, where Prime Minister Omar Abdirashid Ali Sharmarke led talks with the prime minister of Qatar, Abdullah bin Nasser bin Khalifa Al Thani. The federal delegation included Minister of Planning and International Cooperation Abdirahman Yusuf Hussein Aynte, Minister of Health Hawo Hassan Mohamed, Minister of Transport and Aviation Ali Ahmed Jama Jangali and Ambassador of Somalia to Qatar Omar Idris. The gathering focused on strengthening investment, commerce and governance ties between both territories, with an emphasis on stabilization initiatives. It concluded with a signed cooperative agreement in the civil aviation and education sectors. According to Sharmarke, the treaty aims to accelerate the ongoing reconstruction and development process in Somalia and to buttress local job creation. Among the agreement's stipulations, Qatar Airways is scheduled to begin making flights to the Aden Adde International Airport in Mogadishu.

==== Somalia-UAE bilateral cooperation ====
In March 2015, Omer Hadliye met with Foreign Affairs Minister of the United Arab Emirates, Abdullah bin Zayed Al Nahyan, at his office in Abu Dhabi. The two leaders touched on various bilateral matters, including strengthening collaboration and cooperation in the security sector, among other areas. They also evaluated ongoing mutual projects and discussed the political situation in Somalia. Omer Hadliye in turn commended the Emirati government for its various development initiatives in Somalia, and applauded the UAE's commitment to the reconstruction process therein.

==== 26th Arab League summit ====
In March 2015, Omer Hadliye was part of a Federal Government of Somalia delegation led by President Hassan Sheikh Mohamud, which attended the 26th Arab League summit in Sharm el-Sheikh, Egypt. The delegates were received at the local airport by President of Egypt Abdel Fattah el-Sisi and League of Arab States representatives. Omer Hadliye had shortly before expressed support for the Saudi Arabia-led military intervention in Yemen against the Houthi rebels. In response to a call from President of Yemen Abd Rabbuh Mansur Hadi for Arab League cooperation in stabilizing the situation, he and Mohamud also reaffirmed Somalia's support for the legitimacy of the incumbent Yemeni government and its anti-terrorist efforts. Omer Hadliye also officially confirmed that the Somali federal government had permitted the Saudi-led forces to use Somalia's airspace, territorial waters and land for the counter-insurgency effort in Yemen. It likewise offered to share its stabilization-related experience with the coalition forces. The approval came after Somalia had leased its airspace to Arab states of the Persian Gulf, with Bosaso in the northeast and Berbera in the northwest scheduled to be used by the coalition forces due to their proximity to Yemen.

==== Somalia-China bilateral cooperation ====
In April 2015, Omer Hadliye met in Mogadishu with Ambassador of China to Somalia Wei Hongtian to discuss ties between both nations. The meeting concluded with a signed bilateral agreement, which strengthens diplomatic relations and collaboration. As part of the treaty's stipulations, $13 million in Chinese funds will be earmarked for reconstruction and development initiatives in the economy, health, education and infrastructure sectors in Somalia. According to Ambassador Wei Hongtian, the Chinese authorities are slated to continue their support for the Somali government's stabilizations efforts. Omer Hadliye in turn commended the Chinese government for its sustained cooperation.

==== Diplomatic reshuffle ====
In April 2015, the Federal Cabinet held a meeting wherein new diplomatic appointments were announced. The decision was reached at the recommendation of Omer Hadliye's Ministry of Foreign Affairs, which suggested reshuffling the ambassadorial positions. Among the newly assigned officials were former Information Minister Dahir Mohamed Geele as Ambassador of Somalia to Saudi Arabia, senior Washington embassy-based diplomat Jamal Mohamed Hassan as Ambassador of Somalia to Kenya, and Jamal Mohamed Barrow as Ambassador of Somalia to South Africa. Fatuma Abdullahi Insaniya was also appointed Ambassador of Somalia to the United States, the first woman to hold the office, while Khadija Mohamed retained her position as Ambassador of Somalia to Iraq. The Council of Ministers also indicated that the government was slated to refurbish its embassy in France, and to reopen its embassies in Germany, Malaysia and Burundi.

==== Somalia-Uganda bilateral cooperation ====
In April 2015, Hadliye and other Foreign Ministry officials met with the acting Ambassador of Uganda to Somalia, Nathan Mugisha, at the ministry's headquarters in Mogadishu. The officials touched on various bilateral matters, including Uganda's military contingent within AMISOM. Omer Hadliye also briefed the envoy on the reconstruction and development process in Somalia, noting that progress was steady.

==== Somali remittance firms ====
In April 2015, Omer Hadliye met in Nairobi with Foreign Minister of Kenya Amina Mohamed to discuss Somali business interests in the country. The officials touched on the license suspension of 13 Somali-owned remittance firms earlier in the month, which the Kenyan government had imposed in the wake of the Garissa University College attack. According to Omer Hadliye, he pointed out that the suspended money transfer companies were run by taxpaying citizens of Kenya, so the governmental decree would most immediately impact the local Somali community. He also noted that the firms provided remittance services to individuals from several different nations. Additionally, Omer Hadliye indicated that he and Mohamed agreed on these points, with Mohamed pledging that the authorities in Kenya would reconsider their decision.

==== Somalia-US bilateral cooperation ====
In April 2015, Omer Hadliye met with a US Senate and US Congress delegation while on a state visit in Nairobi. The officials discussed various bilateral matters, including the counterinsurgency operation in Somalia against the Al-Shabaab militant group, facilitating the evacuation of Somali expatriates in Yemen due to the Houthi conflict, trade, and investment. Omer Hadliye also briefed the US lawmakers on the sociopolitical progress in Somalia, as well as the Vision 2016 roadmap.

==== Somalia-UN bilateral cooperation ====
In April 2015, Hadliye met with UN General Assembly President Sam Kutesa. The Foreign Minister briefed the UN leader on the socio-political situation and the ongoing reconstruction and development process in Somalia. Omer Hadliye also commended the UN for its support of local peace-building initiatives. Additionally, he highlighted the general progress made in terms of state-building, and emphasized his administration's focus on the political, economic and security sectors. Kutesa in turn reaffirmed the General Assembly's commitment to the peace, reconstruction and development process.

==== Somalia-Qatar bilateral cooperation ====
In May 2015, Omer Hadliye, President Hassan Sheikh Mohamud and Prime Minister Omar Abdirashid Ali Sharmarke met in Villa Somalia in Mogadishu with a visiting Qatari government delegation led by the Foreign Affairs Minister of Qatar, Khalid bin Mohammad Al Attiyah. The officials touched on various bilateral matters, including the security and educational sectors as well as the Houthi insurgency in Yemen. Additionally, Al Attiyah reaffirmed his administration's support for the Somali government's reconstruction efforts. He also indicated that the Qatari government would invest in Somalia given the nation's abundant natural resources and other investment opportunities. Omer Hadliye in turn commended the Qatari leadership for its support of security and stabilization initiatives in Somalia.

== Awards ==
In 2001, Omer Hadliye was awarded the Third "Hats Off" Award by the National Association to Restore Pride in America's Capital (NARPAC) for his contributions to good governance in the District of Columbia.

== Publications ==
- Abdusalam Omer and Gina El Koury, "Regulation and Supervision in a Vacuum: The Story of the Somali Remittance Sector", Small Enterprise Development, Vol. 15, No. 1 (2004)
- Abdusalam Omer, Supporting Systems and Procedures for the Effective Regulation and Monitoring of Somali Remittance Companies (Hawala), United Nations Development Programme (2002)
- Abdusalam Omer, Towards Understanding the Somali Bureaucracy, University of Tennessee (1986)

== Professional memberships ==
- Money Transmitter Regulators Association

== See also ==
- List of foreign ministers in 2017

== Notes ==
Political offices
Preceded by Abdirahman Duale Beyle	Foreign Minister of Somalia; 27 January 2015 – 29 March 2017	Succeeded by Yusuf Garaad Omar
