= Abdullahi Sheikh Ismail =

Somali politician (died 2021)

Abdullahi Sheikh Ismail عبد الله الشيخ إسماعيل

Minister of Transport of Somalia
- In office 12 January 2015 – 2021
- Prime Minister: Omar Abdirashid Ali Sharmarke

Personal details
- Born: 1940 Shalambood, Somalia
- Died: 7 May 2021 Mogadishu, Somalia
- Party: Independent

Abdullahi Sheikh Ismail (Somali: Cabdullaahi Sheekh Ismaaciil, Arabic: عبد الله الشيخ إسماعيل) (died 7 May 2021) was a Somali politician.

Abdulahi belongs to the Biimal clan of Dir. he worked as Translator to Somali parliament in 1960s, Somalia’s Ambassador to Tunis, and was later a member of SSNM front. He previously served as a Deputy Prime Minister, as well as a Minister of Foreign Affairs in the Transitional Federal Government of Somalia. On 12 January 2015, Ismail was appointed the new Minister of Transport of the Federal Government of Somalia by Prime Minister Omar Abdirashid Ali Sharmarke. He was first secretary at the embassy in Cairo in 1972. He became Deputy PM & Foreign Minister Before being appointed as the Chair of Somalia-Somaliland talks. He spoke Somali, Arabic, English and Italian.
