= Muse Hassan Sheikh Sayid Abdulle =

Somali politician

Muse Hassan Sheikh Abdulle موسى حسن شيخ عبد الله
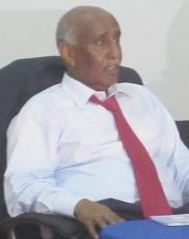

Acting President of Somalia
- In office 20 August 2012 – 28 August 2012
- Prime Minister: Abdiweli Gaas
- Preceded by: Sharif Sheikh Ahmed
- Succeeded by: Mohamed Osman Jawari (acting)

Speaker of the House of the People of Somalia
- Acting
- In office 20 August 2012 – 28 August 2012
- Preceded by: Sharif Hassan Sheikh Aden
- Succeeded by: Mohamed Osman Jawari

Ambassador to Italy
- In office 20 June 2013 – 29 November 2016

Personal details
- Born: Mussa Hassan Sheikh Abdulle; December 25, 1940 (age 85) Shilavo, Somali Region, Ethiopia
- Party: Independent

Muse Hassan Sheikh Sayid Abdulle (Somali: Muuse Xasan Sheekh Cabdulle, Arabic: موسى حسن الشيخ سعيد عبد الله; born 1940), also known as Muse Sayyid Hassan or Mussa Hassan Sheikh Abdulle, is from the well-known "Sheikh Hassanur family". He is a senior Somali military figure and politician. He has been the acting president of Somalia and interim speaker of the Federal Parliament. He was also Somalia's ambassador to Italy. He is currently retired.

== Biography ==
His name is transliterated in various ways including Musa Hassan Abdulle. He was born in 1940 in Shilabo, Ogaden and hails from Bahgeri sub-clan of the larger Ogaden Absame Kuumade Darod clan.

== Career ==
=== Military career ===
Abdulle was a prominent member of the Somali National Army. He was among the first three Somali cadets to graduate from the Military Academy of Modena (Accademia Militare di Modena), located in Modena, northern Italy. In 1985, Abdulle received a fellowship to attend the National Defense University in Washington, D.C. He graduated from the institution the following year.

=== Federal Government of Somalia ===
==== Federal Parliament and interim presidency ====
Following the end of the mandate of the Transitional Federal Government (TFG) on 20 August 2012 and the concurrent start of the Federal Government of Somalia, Abdulle, as the eldest legislator, was appointed interim speaker of the new Federal Parliament during its inaugural session held at the Aden Adde International Airport in Mogadishu. He was additionally named Acting President at the ceremony, which also saw the swearing in of many MPs. Voting for a new speaker of Parliament was held on 28 August 2012, with former Minister of Transportation and Minister of Labor and Sports Mohamed Osman Jawari elected the permanent speaker.

On 30 August 2012, the Federal Parliament convened and unanimously endorsed a new committee tasked with overseeing Somalia's 2012 presidential elections. At the parliamentary session chaired by the new Speaker Jawari, 15 MPs were named to the body and Abdulle was appointed the commission's chairperson. The ballot was eventually held on 1 September 2012, with Hassan Sheikh Mohamud elected as the new President of Somalia.

==== Ambassador to Italy ====
On 20 June 2013, Abdulle was named Somalia's ambassador to Italy by the cabinet.

== Military training and positions ==
=== Training ===
- National Defense University, Washington, D.C. – Class of 1986
- Scuola di Guerra (War College), Civitavecchia, Italy – 1968–70
- Battalion Commander Training, Mogadishu, Somalia – 1964–65
- Scuola Applicazione d'Arma (Military Research Institute), Turin, Italy – 1961–63
- Modena Military Academy, Modena, Italy – 1959–61
- Scuola Media Superiore (High School), Mogadishu – 1955–59

=== Experience ===
- Commander, 60th Division, Baidoa, Somalia – 1986–89
- Promoted to the rank of brigadier general – 1986
- Commandant, Ahmed Gurey War College, Mogadishu – 1983–84
- Member, National Purchasing Board, Mogadishu – 1979–83
- Defense Attache, Rome, Italy – 1976–79
- Military Advisor & Aide to the President – 1973–76
- Promoted to the rank of colonel – 1974
- Director of Operations, Ministry of Defense – 1971–73
- Commander, 26th Division, Somali National Army, Hargeisa – 1970–71
- Promoted to the rank of lieutenant colonel – 1970
- Commander, Tank and motorized Battalions, Hargeisa – 1965–68
- Promoted to the rank of major – 1967
- Promoted to the rank of captain – 1965
- Promoted to the rank of 1st lieutenant – 1963
- Promoted to the rank of 2nd lieutenant – 1961
- Joined Somali National Army – 1959

== See also ==
- Muhammad Ali Samatar
- Abdirizak Mohamud Abubakar
- Abdullahi Yusuf Ahmed
- Abdullahi Ahmed Irro

Political offices
Preceded by Sharif Sheikh Ahmed	President of Somalia; Acting; 2012	Succeeded by Mohamed Osman Jawari; Acting
