= Nadifo Mohamed Osman =

Somali politician

Nadifo Mohamed Osman نظيفة محمد عثمان
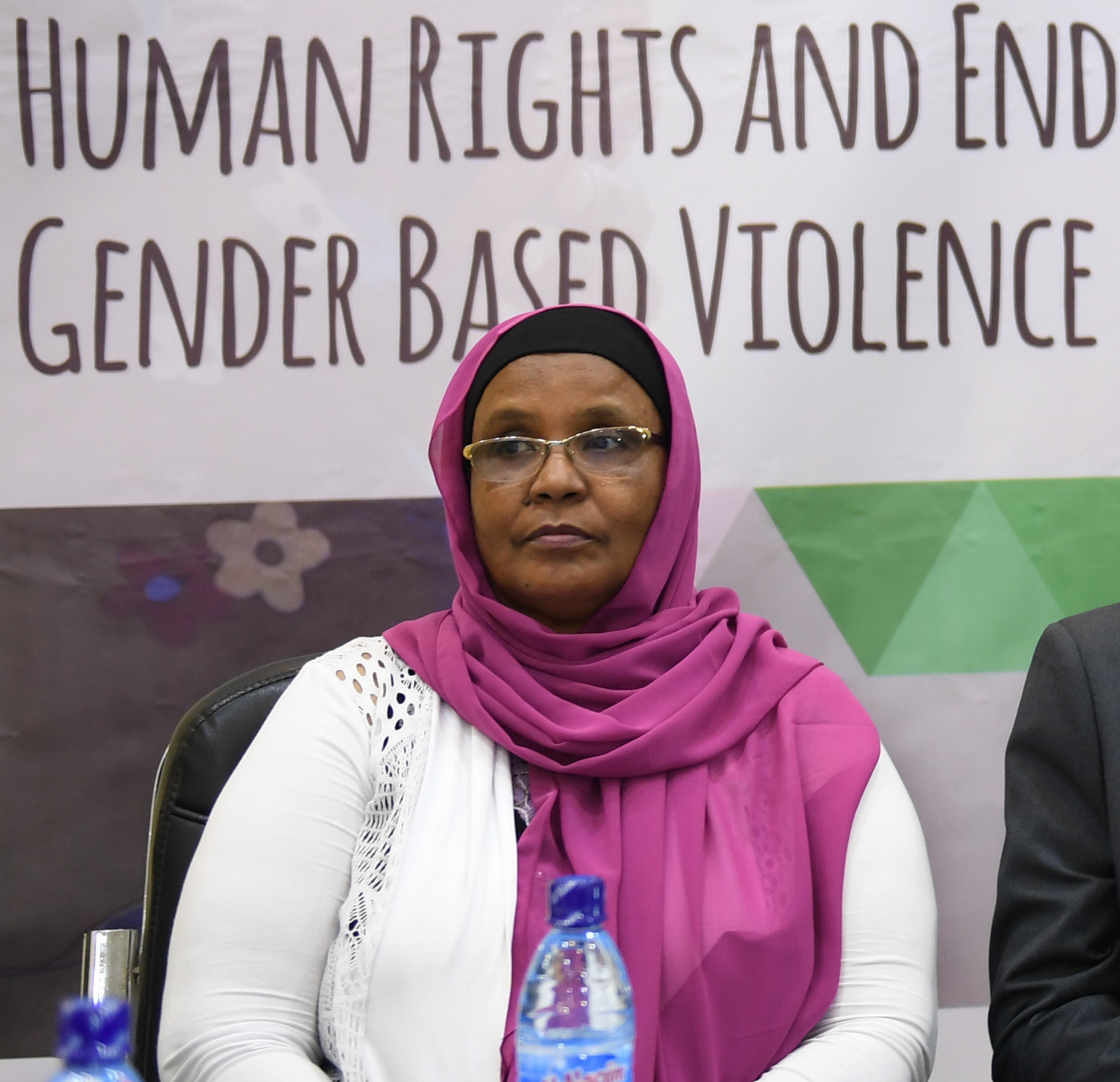

Minister of Public Works and Reconstruction of Somalia
- Incumbent
- Assumed office 17 January 2014
- Prime Minister: Abdiweli Sheikh Ahmed

Nadifo Mohamed Osman (Somali: Nadiifa Maxamed Cismaan, Arabic: نظيفة محمد عثمان) is a Somali politician. She was the Minister of Public Works and Reconstruction of Somalia, having been appointed to the position on 17 January 2014 by Prime Minister Abdiweli Sheikh Ahmed.

== Minister of Public Works and Reconstruction ==
=== Appointment ===
On 17 January 2014, Osman was named Somalia's new Minister of Public Works and Reconstruction by Prime Minister Abdiweli Sheikh Ahmed.

=== Somalia-Japan bilateral cooperation ===
In March 2014, Osman and a Somali government delegation including President Hassan Sheikh Mohamud, Minister of Foreign Affairs and International Cooperation Abdirahman Duale Beyle and Minister of Planning Said Abdullahi Mohamed made a four-day visit to Tokyo, where they met with Ambassador Tatsushi Terada and other senior Japanese government officials. President Mohamud and his delegation also conferred with Prime Minister Shinzo Abe to discuss strengthening bilateral relations, as well as capacity training for Somali livestock and agricultural development professionals. The visit concluded with an announcement by Japanese Prime Minister Abe that his administration would put forth a $40 million funding package for the rehabilitation of Somalia's police forces, relief services, and job creation opportunities. Mohamud commended the Japanese government for intensifying its bilateral support, and suggested that the development initiatives would be centered on vocational training for youth and women, maritime and fisheries training, fisheries and agricultural infrastructure development, and communication and information technology support.
