= Lafoole University =

University in Somalia

- Jaamacada Lafoole
- Established: 1973
- Location: Lafoole, Afgooye District, Lower Shebelle, Somalia

Lafoole University, sometimes referred to as Lafoole College, is a teaching institution in Lafoole, Afgooye District, situated in the Lower Shebelle region in southern Somalia.

== Background ==
Lafoole University, Somalia's premier teacher training college, was part of the Somali National University (SNU). Lafoole lies 22 km west of Mogadishu on the road to Afooye.

The term, "Lafoole College", was sometimes applied to nearby Lafoole Orphanage Boys College on the other side of the Mogadishu-Afoi corridor. "The Lafoole College" had two high schools, one regular secondary school and the other, a technical training school supported by West Germany.

== History ==
Lafoole University started as two-year technical training college for various skills including agricultural sciences, livestock and civil servant services. The college took a new from in 1965 when it was made a stand-alone college and renamed Lafoole University in 1973.

== Departments ==
Lafoole University had 13 major programs or departments with student enrollment of 1,344 students for 1983–84 school year with 24% being female.

Although education or teacher training was the description of Lafoole University, it also produced thousands of students with non-teaching degrees.
