= Wei Hongtian =

Ambassador of China to Somalia

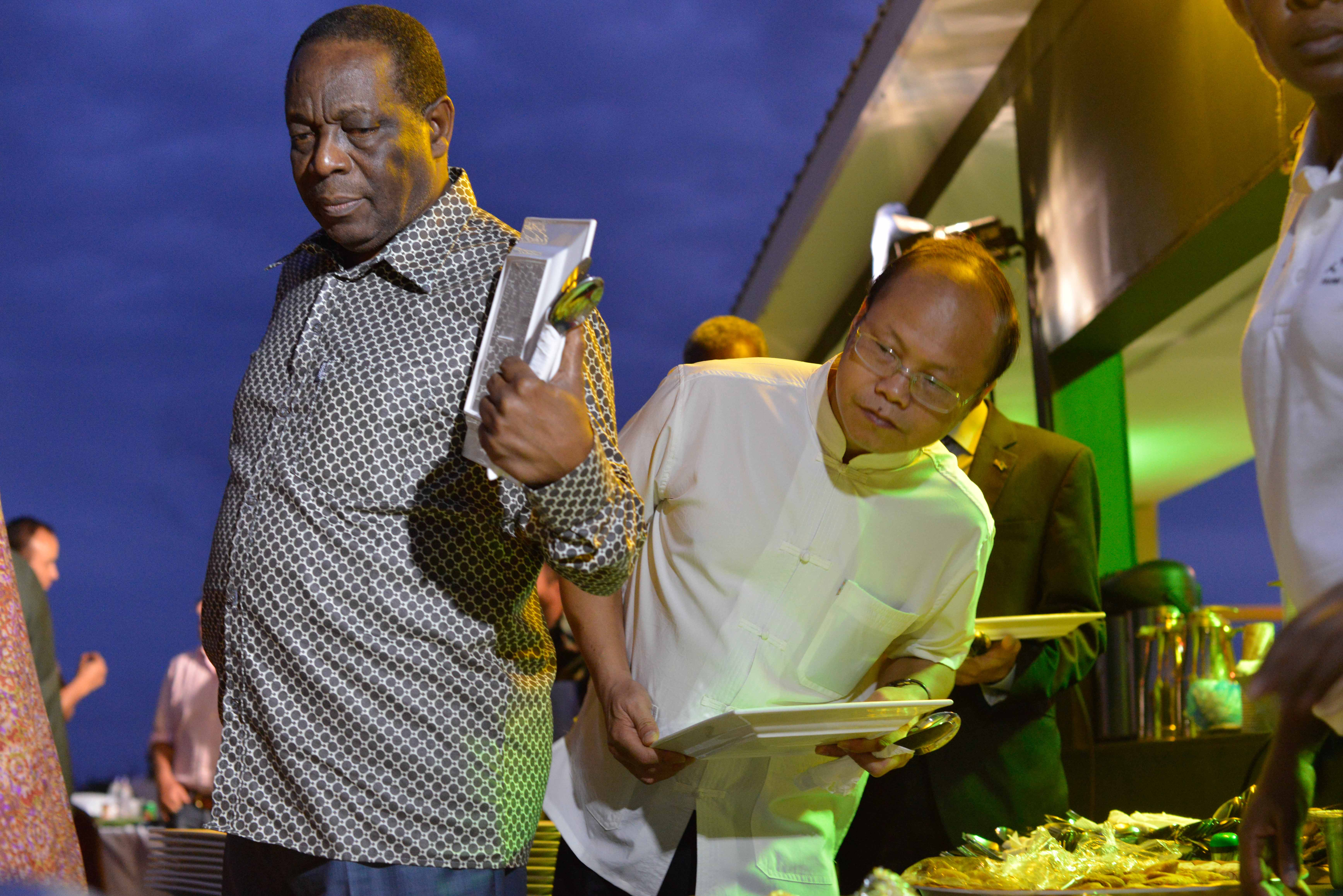
- The Special Representative of the Chairperson of the African Union Commission (SRCC) for Somalia, Ambassador Francisco Caetano Jose Madeira (left), and the Chinese Ambassador to Somalia H.E Wei Hongtian (middle) in 2016

Ambassador of the People's Republic of China to Somalia
- Incumbent
- Assumed office 15 December 2014
- Preceded by: Himself (as Chargé d'Affaires)

Chargé d'Affaires of the Embassy of China in Somalia
- In office 3 July 2014 – 15 December 2014
- Preceded by: Position re-established
- Succeeded by: Himself

Personal details
- Born: China
- Party: Chinese Communist Party
- Education: Somali National University

Wei Hongtian is a Chinese diplomat. He briefly served as the Chargé d'Affaires of the Embassy of the People's Republic of China in Somalia. In December 2014, he was appointed Ambassador of China to Somalia.

== Personal life ==
Wei Hongtian pursued his tertiary studies abroad, matriculating at the Somali National University in Mogadishu during the 1980s. He is fluent in the Somali language.

== Career ==
On 30 June 2014, Chinese Foreign Ministry spokesman Hong Lei announced that China would dispatch a diplomatic team on 1 July to reopen the Chinese embassy in Mogadishu. He described the move as both recognition that the Somali authorities were making progress in their national reconstruction efforts and a symbol of the importance that the Chinese government attaches to its bilateral relations with Somalia. On 3 July 2014, Chargé d'Affaires of the Embassy of the People's Republic of China Wei Hongtian presented his credentials to Foreign Minister of Somalia Abdirahman Duale Beyle at an event in the Somali capital. Beyle similarly hailed the appointment as a sign of the nation's strengthening security and foreign diplomatic relations. On 12 October 2014, the new Chinese embassy officially opened in Mogadishu.

On 15 December 2014, Wei Hongtian presented his credentials to President Hassan Sheikh Mohamud as the newly appointed Chinese Ambassador to Somalia. He is the first such envoy after the reopening of the Chinese embassy in Mogadishu.

In April 2015, Wei Hongtian met in Mogadishu with Foreign Affairs Minister of Somalia Abdisalam Omer to discuss ties between both nations. The meeting concluded with a signed bilateral agreement, which strengthens diplomatic relations and collaboration. As part of the treaty's stipulations, $13 million in Chinese funds will be earmarked for reconstruction and development initiatives in the economy, health, education and infrastructure sectors in Somalia. According to Ambassador Wei, the Chinese authorities are slated to continue their support for the Somali government's stabilizations efforts. Omer in turn commended the Chinese government for its sustained cooperation.
