= Somali National University =

National university in Mogadishu

- الجامعة الوطنية الصومالية; Jaamacadda Ummadda Soomaaliyeed; Università Nazionale Somala
- Former names: Università Nazionale Somala
- Type: Public
- Established: 1954; 72 years ago
- Rector: Hassan Osman Ga'al
- Location: Mogadishu, Benadir, Somalia; 2.038°N 45.287°E
- Campus: Urban
- Website: snu.edu.so/en

Somali National University (SNU) (Somali: Jaamacadda Ummadda Soomaaliyeed, Arabic: الجامعة الوطنية الصومالية, Italian: Università Nazionale Somala) is a national university in Mogadishu, the capital of Somalia. Its campus grounds were located four kilometers from the Mogadishu International Airport (Aden Adde International Airport). It was established in 1971, but was "officially" founded in 1954. It closed in 1990. After closing down for a number of years, the university reopened in August 2014.

== History ==
=== General ===
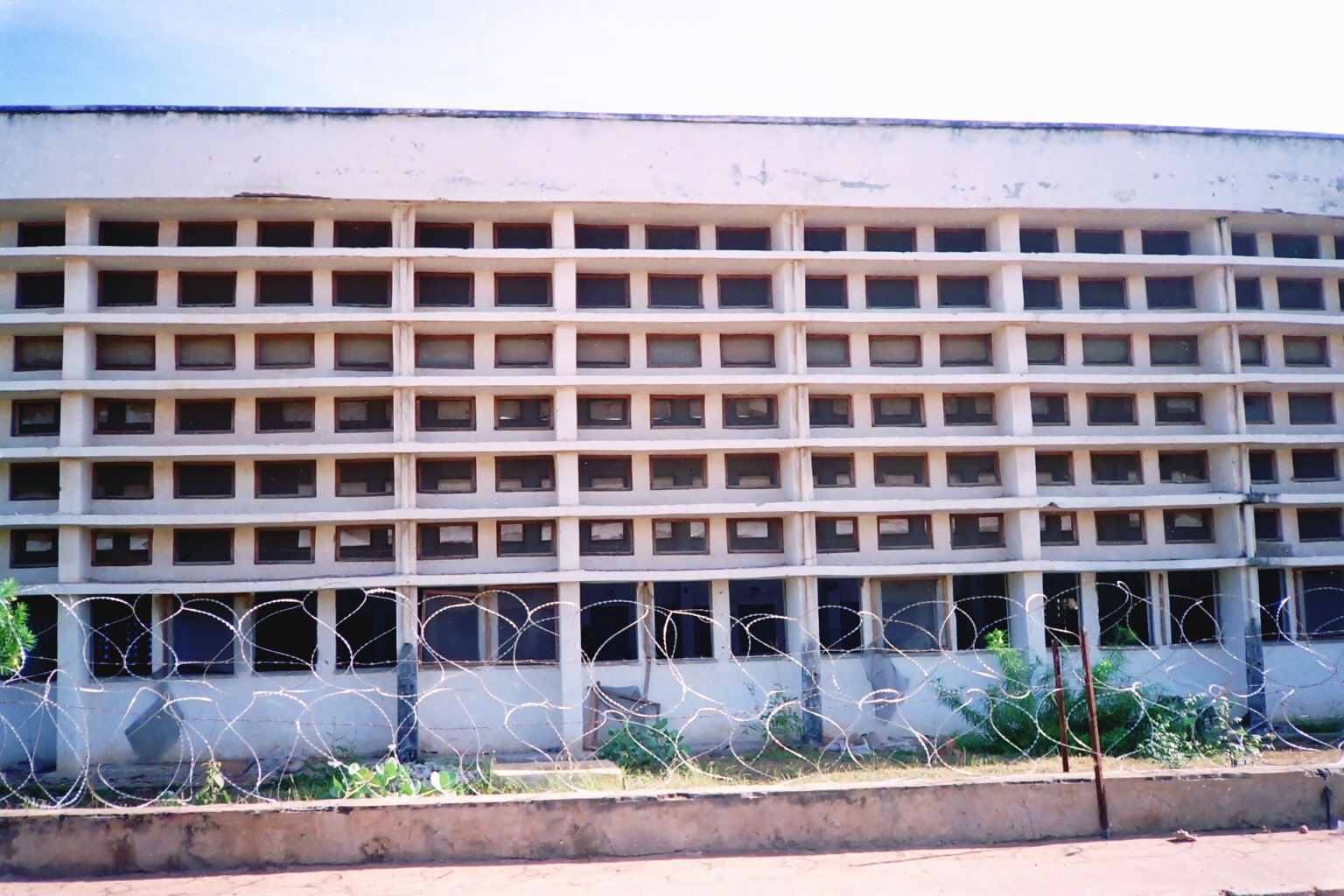
The former Somali National University campus grounds (early 1990s)

The Somali National University was established in 1954 as Università Nazionale Somala, under Italian U.N. Trusteeship over Italy's former Italian colony in East Africa of Italian Somaliland. In 1960, Somalia became an independent nation in the Trust Territory of Somalia. It obtained official university status in 1969 and the language initially used was only Italian.

The Somali National University, based in Mogadishu, was born in 1969 as part of a project by the Italian Ministry of Foreign Affairs (MAE) for technical assistance to Somalia. The aim was to train graduates of Somali nationality, as in every part of the world, for the new leading and technical cadres of the country.The first courses were those of economics and jurisprudence. From '71 to '73, other degree courses were instituted including agrarian, chemistry, medicine, engineering and geology. In 1986 the Somali Ministry of Education and Culture made an official request to the University of Padua (which already ran the degree courses in chemistry and geology) to organize a faculty of sciences that included, in addition to the existing ones degree courses, those in mathematics, physics and biology. Only in 1987 did this new faculty start to operate. Jama

In 1983, nine out of the twelve faculties in the Somali National University used Italian as the language of instruction, but after 1990 only Somali and English were used.

The main university grounds were situated about six kilometers from the city center. Here, during the institution's first thirty years, the main campus was known as Jaamacada Gaheyr ("Gaheyr University").

In 1973, under the Supreme Revolutionary Council (SRC), programs and facilities were expanded. The SNU developed over the next twenty years into an institution of higher learning, with 13 departments, 700 staff and over 15,000 students.

Under the Somali revolutionary government, the Ministry of Higher Learning and Culture established research centers in a number of cities, with the goal of developing regional economies. These learning centers were earmarked for employees from such ministries as the Ministry of Agriculture, and the Ministry of Livestock and Forestry Management.

In the mid-1970s, the teaching college of Lafoole University, one of SNU's remote campuses, was made a stand-alone institution ("Lafoole Teacher's College"). The language of instruction was English.

Due to extensive damage to its facilities as well as the difficulty of holding classes and acquiring books and other necessities in the wake of the civil war in the early 1990s, classes at the university were suspended.

=== Language of instruction ===
Italian was the Somali National University's primary language of instruction. The university's main campus was situated in Mogadishu, where residents were already familiar with the Italian language.

From 1973 onward, Somali and English were introduced as additional languages of instruction. All programs at Lafoole College were taught in English. Across the country, there were programs in Af Soomaali run by the Ministry of Culture and Higher Education, the government ministry responsible for scholastic instruction.

When the Somali linguist Shire Jama Ahmed's modified Latin script was chosen by the Siad Barre administration as the nation's official orthography, Somali language courses began to spring up throughout the country. The language of instruction in primary and secondary schools also became Somali.

=== Relaunch ===
On 14 November 2013, the former Prime Minister Abdi Farah Shirdon "Saacid" and his cabinet approved a federal government plan to reopen the Somali National University. The refurbishing initiative cost US$55.2 million. On 16 August 2014, the federal government officially re-opened the Somali National University at a meeting of the Board of the University. The event was chaired by former President of Somalia Hassan Sheikh Mohamud, who serves as the head of the university's committee in charge of the curriculum, budget dispensation and faculties.

On 18 September 2014, about 480 pupils took the university's entry exams, which were supervised by the Chairman of the Somali National University Dr. Mohamed Ahmed Jimale and the Deputy Minister of Culture and Higher Education Mohamed Ahmed Kulan. In October 2014, Speaker of the Federal Parliament Mohamed Osman Jawari and Minister of Culture and Higher Education Duale Adan Mohamed officially inaugurated the first academic year of the Somali National University.

== Campuses ==
The Somali National University had four main campuses:

- Gaheyr – Mogadishu at KM 6
- Digfeer – Medical school near Digfeer Hospital in Mogadishu
- Lafoole Teaching College – Lafoole.
- Polytechnic College at KM 4, Mogadishu

The first campus, Gaheyr, opened in 1971 and was located at KM 6 (on the Afgooye Road, 6 km from downtown Mogadishu). There were also new expansion buildings across from Gaheyr Campus. The new buildings took some years to complete and were situated on the other side of the Afgoi road, facing Gaheyr.

Most of the new buildings had some sort of circular design to them, and the engineer who designed them was unofficially nicknamed "Engineer O" by the students.

== Faculties and departments ==
The Somali National University formerly had 14 departments:

- Department of Sharia Law
- Department of Linguistics (Somali, Arabic, English, German, Italian)
- Faculty of Veterinary Medicine and Animal Husbandry
- College of Education (Teaching College at Lafoole; 20 km west of Mogadishu)
- Department of Agriculture
- Department of Geology and Mining
- Department of Medicine (College of Medicine; near Digfeer Hospital)
- Department of Chemical/Industrial Engineering
- Faculty of Economics
- Faculty of Law
- Department of Engineering
- Faculty of Political science and Journalism
- Technical and Commercial Teachers' College (formerly called Technical Teachers' College), Known as "Polytechnic College" located at KM 4, Mogadishu.
- Institute of Development Administration & Management

== Notable alumni ==
Notable alumni of the Somali National University include:

- Hassan Sheikh Mohamud – President of Somalia
- Ahmed Mohamed Kismayo, Journalist (died 2017)
- Mustafe Haji Ismail, Somali-Norwegian Muslim cleric, scholar, and Islamic philosopher
- Ahmed Ibrahim Awale – environmentalist and author
- Professor Ahmed Mumin Warfa – Somali Scientist and Scholar on Plant Taxonomy and Botany.
- Abdirahman Mohamud Farole – former President of Puntland
- Abdi Farah Shirdon Former Prime Minister of Somalia
- Abdiweli Mohamed Ali – President of Puntland, and former Prime Minister of Somalia
- Abdiweli Sheikh Ahmed – former Prime Minister of Somalia
- Saad Ali Shire – current Minister of Finance of Somaliland, former Foreign Minister of Somaliland, and former Minister of Planning of Somaliland
- Abdulqawi Yusuf – international lawyer and judge with the International Court of Justice
- Ali Mohammed Ghedi – former Prime Minister of Somalia
- Ali Said Faqi – scientist and leading researcher in toxicology
- Asha Gelle Dirie – former Minister of Women Development and Family Affairs of Puntland
- Asha Haji Elmi – peace activist and MP
- Asha Jama – Somali-Canadian activist
- Faysal Ali Warabe – Chairman of the For Justice and Development (UCID) political party
- Hawa Abdi – humanitarian and physician
- Hassan Abshir Farah – former Prime Minister of Somalia
- Hassan Ismail Yusuf – former Minister of Health of Somaliland
- Jama Musse Jama – ethnomathematician, author, founding director of Hargeysa International Book Fair, Somaliland.
- Michel Micombero – former President and Prime Minister of Burundi
- Wei Hongtian – Former Ambassador of China to Somalia

== See also ==
- List of Islamic educational institutions

== Relevant sources ==
- Frigerio, Alessandro, and Laura Montedoro. "Reconstructing the Campus of the Somali National University in Mogadishu: The Vision for a Park of Knowledge." In Proceedings of the Third International Conference of the journal Scuola democratica. Education and/for Social Justice. Vol. 2: Cultures, Practices, and Change vol. 2, pp. 842-848. Associazione Per Scuola Democratica, 2025.
