= Abdirahman Beyle =

Former Minister of finance of Somalia

Abdirahman Duale Beyle MP
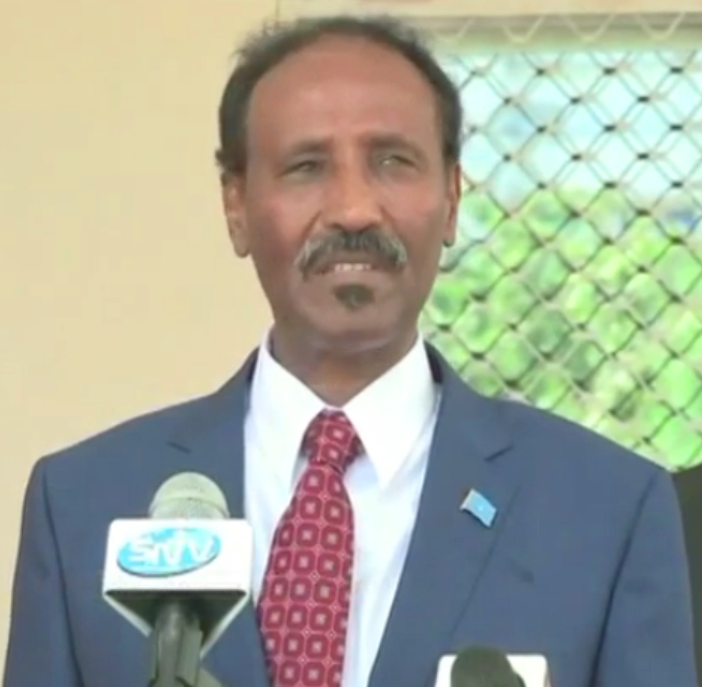

Minister of Finance
- In office 29 March 2017 – 2 August 2022
- President: Mohamed Abdullahi Mohamed
- Prime Minister: Hassan Ali Khaire; Mohamed Hussein Roble
- Preceded by: Mohamud Ibrihim Adan
- Succeeded by: Elmi Mohamud Noor

Minister of Foreign Affairs of Somalia
- In office 17 January 2014 – 27 January 2015
- President: Hassan Sheikh Mohamud
- Prime Minister: Abdiweli Sheikh Ahmed
- Preceded by: Fowziya Yusuf Haji Adan
- Succeeded by: Abdisalam Omer

Personal details
- Born: 1955 or 1956 (age 70–71) Arabsiyo, Gabiley, Somaliland
- Party: Independent
- Education: University of Wisconsin–Madison

Abdirahman Duale Beyle (Somali: Cabdiraxmaan Ducaale Beyle; Arabic: عبد الرحمن دعاله بايل), also known as Abdirahman D. Beileh, is a Somali economist, professor, politician, philanthropist, poet, and songwriter. He served as the Minister of Foreign Affairs and International Cooperation of Somalia from January 2014 to January 2015. He most recently served as Minister of Finance of Somalia.

== Personal life ==
Beyle was born in 1955 or 1956 in the northwestern town of Arabsiyo, Gabiley, Somaliland. For his post-secondary education, Beyle earned a bachelor's degree in finance & economics, an MBA from the University of Wisconsin-La Crosse and a PhD from the University of Wisconsin–Madison.

Besides Somali, he is reportedly fluent in Arabic, English, and French.

== Career ==
=== Early career ===
In a professional capacity, Beyle taught economics, statistics and finance at universities in Saudi Arabia and the United States.

He later accepted a position at the African Development Bank (AfDB), where he worked as a finance officer. He served as an economist, manager and director in various AfDB departments, including agriculture and rural development, water, and operations policies and procedures. His last appointment at the institution was as the head of the AfDB's Department of Agriculture and Agro-Industry. In this new leadership role, Beyle oversaw around 135 projects and investments valued at $3.5 billion, as well as managed a staff of over 100 and supervised special funds.

Besides diplomacy, teaching and economics, Beyle has also engaged in philanthropic work. To this end, he helped fund and establish a school in the Awdal region.

=== Minister of Foreign Affairs and International Cooperation ===
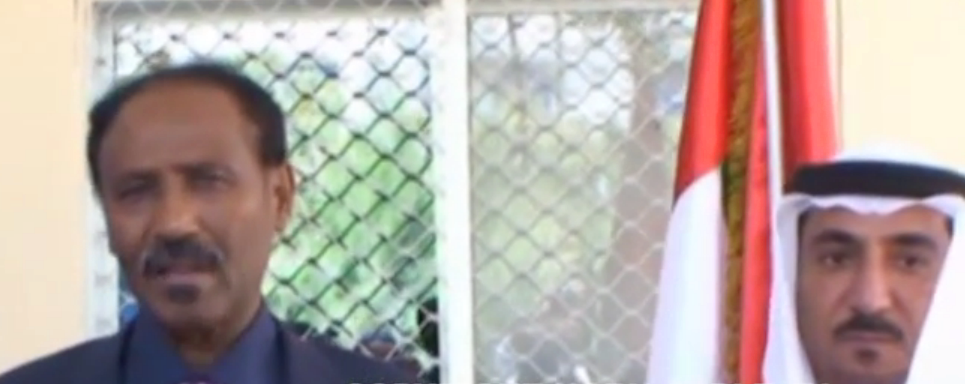
Minister of Foreign Affairs of Somalia Abdirahman Duale Beyle meeting with the UAE Ambassador to Somalia Mohamed Al-Osmani in Mogadishu.

==== Appointment ====
On 17 January 2014, Beyle was named Somalia's new Minister of Foreign Affairs and International Cooperation by Prime Minister Abdiweli Sheikh Ahmed. He succeeded Fowziya Yusuf Haji Adan at the position.

==== Institute of Diplomacy ====
In February 2014, Foreign Minister Beyle announced that the federal government was slated to reopen the former Institute of Diplomacy in Mogadishu, Somalia's capital. The center historically served as one of the most important national institutions for diplomacy and international relations. Beyle also pledged to reestablish the institute's diplomacy department, its information and broadcasting department, as well as its library.

==== Somalia-Ethiopia cooperative agreements ====
In February 2014, Beyle was part of a Somali government delegation in Addis Ababa led by Prime Minister Abdiweli Sheikh Ahmed, where the visiting officials met with Ethiopian Prime Minister Hailemariam Desalegn to discuss strengthening bilateral relations between Somalia and Ethiopia. The meeting concluded with a tripartite Memorandum of Understanding agreeing to promote partnership and cooperation, including a cooperative agreement signed by Beyle and the Ethiopian Minister of Federal Affairs Dr. Shiferaw Teklemariam to develop the police force, a second cooperative agreement covering information matters, and a third cooperative agreement on the aviation sector.

==== Somalia-UN cooperative agreement ====
In February 2014, Beyle and UN Special Representative for Somalia Nicholas Kay signed a bilateral agreement outlining the terms of future cooperation between the Somali federal government and the United Nations. According to Beyle, the pact came after extensive consultations between both parties. Along with attorneys, President Hassan Sheikh Mohamud attended the signing of the agreement, which he commended for helping to strengthen cooperation between the Somali authorities and the UN.

==== Somalia-Japan bilateral cooperation ====
In March 2014, Beyle and a Somali government delegation including President Hassan Sheikh Mohamud, Minister of Public Works and Reconstruction Nadifo Mohamed Osman and Minister of Planning Said Abdullahi Mohamed made a four-day visit to Tokyo, where they met with Ambassador Tatsushi Terada and other senior Japanese government officials. President Mohamud and his delegation also conferred with Prime Minister Shinzo Abe to discuss strengthening bilateral relations, as well as capacity training for Somali livestock and agricultural development professionals. The visit concluded with an announcement by Japanese Prime Minister Abe that his administration would put forth a $40 million funding package for the rehabilitation of Somalia's police forces, relief services, and job creation opportunities. Mohamud commended the Japanese government for intensifying its bilateral support, and suggested that the development initiatives would be centered on vocational training for youth and women, maritime and fisheries training, fisheries and agricultural infrastructure development, and communication and information technology support.

==== Somalia, AfDB and Tunisian development cooperation ====
In May 2014, Foreign Minister Beyle led a high level Somali federal government delegation to the African Development Bank headquarters in Tunis, which included Finance Minister Hussein Abdi Halane and other top officials. The visiting parties are slated to meet with the AfDB president Donald Kaberuka to discuss implementation of previous reconstruction development plans and financial pledges made to Somalia. Beyle and his delegation are then scheduled to confer with Tunisian government officials over potential investment programs in Somalia.

==== Arab-China Summit ====
In June 2014, Beyle led a federal government delegation to represent Somalia at the Arab-China Summit in Beijing. According to the minister, the international conference was an opportunity for the Somali authorities to attract foreign investment as part of the post-conflict reconstruction process. Beyle concurrently met his Chinese counterpart Wang Yi to discuss bilateral cooperation between Somalia and China. The meeting was held at the Chinese foreign ministry center and focused on trade, security and reconstruction. Among the issues discussed were the various Chinese development projects that are in the process of being implemented in Somalia. Beyle also indicated that the Chinese authorities are slated to broaden their support for Somalia, which would serve to create new employment opportunities. Additionally, Wang commended the Somali federal government on its peace-building efforts. He likewise reaffirmed the historically close diplomatic ties between both territories, recalling China's recognition of the nascent Somali Republic in 1960 and Somalia's subsequent campaigning which helped China obtain a permanent seat in the United Nations Security Council.

Beyle also indicated that the delegation would subsequently attend another key conference in Greece, where the foreign ministers of Arab states would meet with European Union foreign ministers.

==== Somalia, Turkey and UN development cooperation ====
In June 2014, Beyle led a Somali government delegation at a diplomatic conference in Turkey. The gathering was also attended by Turkish state officials and United Nations representatives. As part of a commitment by the Somali Foreign Ministry to accelerate the reconstruction process in Somalia and highlight local investment opportunities, Beyle briefed the attendees on the nation's commercial potential, including its extensive coastline and livestock and agricultural resources. Additionally, the Minister held a special meeting with United Nations Development Program officials on the progress and challenges of the rebuilding process. Beyle thanked the UNDP and other UN agencies for their developmental engagement in Somalia, and the UNDP in turn pledged to implement various development projects in the country.

==== Embassy of China ====
On 30 June 2014, Chinese Foreign Ministry spokesman Hong Lei announced that China would dispatch a diplomatic team on 1 July to reopen the Chinese embassy in Mogadishu. He described the move as both recognition that the Somali authorities were making progress in their national reconstruction efforts and a symbol of the importance that the Chinese government attaches to its bilateral relations with Somalia. On 3 July 2014, Chargé d'Affaires of the Embassy of the People's Republic of China Wei Hongtian presented his credentials to Foreign Minister of Somalia Beyle at an event in the Somali capital. Beyle similarly hailed the appointment as a sign of the nation's strengthening security and foreign diplomatic relations.

On 15 December 2014, Wei Hongtian presented his credentials to President Hassan Sheikh Mohamud as the newly appointed Chinese Ambassador to Somalia. He is the first such envoy after the reopening of the Chinese embassy in Mogadishu. Foreign Minister Beyle and Ambassador Wei subsequently held a joint press conference, wherein the officials pledged to further strengthen bilateral ties. As part of the local reconstruction process, Wei also indicated that the Chinese authorities were slated to implement various development projects in Somalia.

==== Somalia-Spain bilateral cooperation ====
In July 2014, Beyle led a Somali government delegation to Madrid to discuss with Spanish Foreign Minister José Manuel García-Margallo ways of strengthening bilateral relations between Somalia and Spain. The two leaders touched on issues of mutual interest, including security cooperation, stabilization initiatives, and support for the Somali federal government. Beyle also held a separate meeting with Alberto Virella, Director of the Spanish government's Africa, Asia and Western European agency for development and co-operation, which centered on the post-conflict reconstruction process in Somalia and establishing new development projects in the country.

==== Somalia-Qatar bilateral cooperation ====
In July 2014, Foreign Affairs Minister of Somalia Beyle held a special meeting in Mogadishu with acting Ambassador of Qatar Hassan Hamza. The representatives discussed reviving official diplomatic ties between both countries and opening a Qatari embassy in the Somali capital, among other issues of mutual interest. Additionally, Hamza pledged to support the Federal Government of Somalia and strengthen bilateral relations.

==== Ambassador of India ====
In August 2014, Beyle met in Mogadishu with the newly appointed Ambassador of India to Somalia, Yogeshwar Varma. The officials discussed diplomatic relations between the two nations, with Varma presenting his credentials to Beyle. The minister and ambassador also conferred with President of Somalia Hassan Sheikh Mohamud at the presidential compound.

==== Foreign embassy reform ====
In October 2014, Somalia's Ministry of Foreign Affairs temporarily closed down nine of its overseas embassies. The move came after Beyle had pledged to minimize the number of such diplomatic missions abroad. According to the Minister, the decision was motivated by financial considerations, and was reached after consultations between federal government officials. The closed embassies included those in Libya, Syria, Burundi, Rwanda, Tanzania, South Sudan, Germany, England and Malaysia.

==== Somalia-Egypt bilateral cooperation ====
In October 2014, Beyle met with Egypt's Charge D'affaires in Somalia, Mohamed Mandour, at his office in Mogadishu. The two officials discussed various issues of mutual interest, including supporting the Federal Government of Somalia's post-conflict reconstruction initiatives and fully re-establishing bilateral ties between both countries. According to Beyle, Egypt is a longstanding ally and current partner of the Somali government.

In December 2014, Beyle, President Hassan Sheikh Mohamud, and a Somali federal government delegation including the acting ministers for Finance, Justice, Interior, and Higher Education traveled to Cairo to confer with the Egyptian authorities. The trip was prompted by an official invitation from the new President of Egypt, Abdel Fattah el-Sisi. The visiting officials were received at the Cairo International Airport by the Egyptian Minister of Education Mahmoud Mohamed Mahmoud Abo El Nasr and Somalia's Ambassador to Egypt Abdullahi Hassan Mohamud. Mohamud subsequently met with the Secretary-General of the Arab League, Nabil Elaraby. According to Ambassador Hassan, the leaders touched on various matters pertaining to the Federal Government of Somalia, including facilitating development and financial support by other Arab states for the Somalian government's ongoing reconstruction initiatives. Additionally, Mohamud and delegates from both administrations conferred with the Grand Imam of Al-Azhar University, Ahmed el-Tayeb. The officials discussed bilateral cooperation in the education, medicine and justice sectors, among others, with the rector emphasizing his preparedness to assist in these fields and urging stronger commitment toward the reconstruction process in Somalia. Mohamud in turn highlighted Al-Azhar's historic Muslim and educational work in Somalia, and underlined the institution's continued potential to provide accurate guidance on Islamic tenets. Mohamud and the other visiting delegates finally held a closed door meeting with President El-Sisi, wherein the officials touched on strengthening bilateral ties between the two countries. The gathering concluded with pledges to collaborate in the economic, educational and military sectors, including training of Somali forces by Egyptian security personnel.

==== Somalia-Sudan bilateral cooperation ====
In October 2014, Foreign Minister Beyle along with President Hassan Sheikh Mohamud met in Mogadishu with the new Ambassador of Sudan to Somalia, Mohamed Yusuf Osman. The Ambassador was received at the Villa Somalia presidential compound, where he presented his credentials to the federal officials. Mohamud and Osman subsequently discussed strengthening bilateral ties between the two nations, educational support, and various other issues of mutual interest. Additionally, Beyle indicated at a press conference following the meeting that the Sudanese embassy had been shut down for a number of years, and that the federal officials welcomed the new Sudanese Ambassador. Osman also passed on greetings on behalf of the President of Sudan Omar al-Bashir.

==== Islamic Development Bank and Organisation of Islamic Cooperation ====
In November 2014, Beyle met with Islamic Development Bank President Ahmad Mohamed Ali Al-Madani at the latter's office in Jeddah, Saudi Arabia. The officials touched on various development projects in the areas of education, water resources and livelihood, as well as matters related to the Federal Government of Somalia. Additionally, Beyle held a special meeting with the Secretary-General of the Organisation of Islamic Cooperation, Iyad bin Amin Madani. According to Beyle, he also took the opportunity to reconfirm earlier pledges that the institutions had made to the Somali federal government after President Hassan Sheikh Mohamud had conferred with the two secretaries-general.

==== Ambassador of Egypt ====
In November 2014, Beyle and President Hassan Sheikh Mohamud met in Mogadishu with Egypt's new Ambassador to Somalia, Mowlid Ismail. Ismail concurrently presented his credentials to Mohamud at the Villa Somalia compound, with Beyle in attendance. The officials subsequently held a closed door meeting in which they discussed various ways to strengthen the historic bilateral ties between the two nations. According to Beyle, Ismail also indicated that his administration would double its development assistance to Somalia in the education sector.

==== New Deal Compact for Reconstruction and Development ====
In November 2014, Foreign Minister Beyle along with over eight federal ministers and representatives from Somalia's Puntland, Jubaland, Galmudug and Southwestern regional states took part in an international conference in Copenhagen on the New Deal Compact for Reconstruction and Development. The summit was co-chaired by President Hassan Sheikh Mohamud along with UN Under-Secretary for Political Affairs Jeffrey D. Feltman, and was attended by delegations from over 140 countries. According to Beyle, the federal officials took the opportunity to present the Somali government's priorities and successes. Mohamud indicated therein that the New Deal Compact was a Somali-led initiative, through which the Federal Government of Somalia developed legal frameworks, initiated state and political reform, re-structured key institutions, and established a foundation for allocating international development assistance toward the central authorities' priority areas. Additionally, Minister of Foreign Affairs of Egypt Sameh Shoukry reaffirmed his administration's support for Somalia's social and security sectors, and noted the Egyptian government's various political brokering efforts.

==== Somalia-Yemen bilateral cooperation ====
In November 2014, Beyle met in Sana'a with the Foreign Minister of Yemen Abdalla Mohamed. According to the Consular of the Embassy of Somalia in Yemen Ahmed Sudani, the two ministers discussed various issues of bilateral interest, including Somali government ships stored in Yemen, maritime security and expatriates. Beyle also sought additional scholarship seats for Somali students so as to further develop the educational sector. Additionally, Beyle held a meeting with the President of Yemen Abd Rabbuh Mansur Hadi and the newly appointed Prime Minister of Yemen, Khaled Bahah. The officials touched on various other bilateral matters, including strengthening cooperation in the trade, security and development sectors. Beyle likewise conferred with the Minister of Fisheries and paid a visit to the Sana'a Chamber of Commerce, where he met with Yemeni business leaders and gave a keynote speech.

==== Somalia-Germany bilateral cooperation ====
In November 2014, Beyle traveled to Rome to attend an international migration summit, where he met with the Foreign Minister of Germany, Frank-Walter Steinmeier. The two officials discussed various bilateral issues, including diplomatic relations and cooperation between the governments of Somalia and Germany, as well as the Somali federal government's counterinsurgency operations. Additionally, Steinmeier emphasized the importance of solidarity and collaboration, and applauded the federal government's reconstruction and stabilization initiatives.

Beyle also discussed bilateral development cooperation in Nairobi with the Ambassador of Germany to Somalia, Andreas Peschke. Peschke reaffirmed the German government's commitment to Somalia's New Deal Compact initiative launched in 2013, when his administration pledged 95 million Euros for associated reconstruction projects. In parallel with the development initiatives, the Ambassador likewise stressed the importance of maintaining security and stabilization measures.

==== Somalia-Oman bilateral cooperation ====
In January 2015, Beyle met with the Omani Foreign Affairs Minister Yousuf bin Alawi bin Abdullah at his office in Oman. Undersecretary for Diplomatic Affairs Ahmed bin Yousuf al Harthy also took part in the gathering. The officials discussed various political matters, including domestic, regional and international affairs. They also touched on existing bilateral ties between both nations and ways to further strengthen them.

==== Somalia-Turkey bilateral cooperation ====
In January 2015, Foreign Affairs Minister Beyle, President Hassan Sheikh Mohamud, and other senior Somali federal government officials received a large Turkish delegation led by newly elected President of Turkey Recep Tayyip Erdoğan at the Aden Adde International Airport in Mogadishu. The delegates included various cabinet ministers and entrepreneurs. Mohamud and Erdoğan concurrently inaugurated a number of Turkish-built development projects in Somalia, including the Somalia-Turkey Education and Research Hospital in the capital and a new terminal at the Aden Adde International Airport. Beyle and the Turkish delegates in turn signed a bilateral treaty on new developmental projects that are scheduled to be implemented in Somalia. Among the agreements was a protocol stating that the new Digfer Hospital in Mogadishu would be jointly operated. The accord stipulates that the institution will be funded for its first five years by the Turkish Ministry of Health, which will likewise provide professional specialists. Per the protocol, the hospital will thereafter be fully managed by the Somalian authorities. Further development agreements were signed pertaining to military and security cooperation, police support and coordination, marine transportation, youth and sports projects, and cooperation between Somali National Television and the Turkish National Radio.

==== OIC embassy treaty ====
In February 2015, interim Foreign Affairs Minister Beyle signed a joint agreement with representatives of the Organization of Islamic Cooperation for the renovation of Somalia's various foreign embassies. According to Beyle, the accord encompasses a number of such state-owned premises, which require refurbishment. During the initiative's first phase, the OIC will conduct a survey of the infrastructure's general condition as well as the necessary expenditure.

==== End of term ====
On 27 January 2015, Beyle's term as Minister of Foreign Affairs and International Cooperation of Somalia ended, when Prime Minister Omar Abdirashid Ali Sharmarke appointed a new Cabinet. He was succeeded in office by Abdisalam Omer.

On 14 February, Beyle's term as Foreign Minister formally ended at an official handover ceremony at the foreign ministry compound in Mogadishu. The event was attended by his successor Omer, new Deputy Prime Minister Mohamed Omar Arte, and other senior federal government officials. Beyle therein noted his various accomplishments during his tenure, and enjoined the foreign ministry personnel to assist the incoming minister. Omer in turn commended Beyle for the latter's diplomatic work, and pledged to fulfill his own duties in accordance with the constitution.

=== Arts works ===
Apart from his Academic and professional career, Dr Beileh is distinguished artist. He is song writer, and poet. His works covers on wide surface of topics. He has written over 75 songs and poems over that covers over variety of subjects; mainly on Somali Nationalism and patriotism. His enrichment of Somali language and culture; and growing up in a basic Somali tradition gave him the grip and power to effortlessly articulate a multi dimensional piece that carries both cultural dilemma as well as metaphored conclusion. his Master pieces includes; Qiiro Calan (the Flag Grieves), Dhalinyaro (Youth), Ardo and Jameson, Mogadishu, 'Somalia Waa Mashruuc' (Somalia (crisis) is project), 'Ina Jicimbir' (Ji'imbir's Son), 'Lugtay Wax I Jiidayaan' (Something Holds Me Back).

== Professional memberships ==
- Member of the African Fertilizer and Agribusiness Partnership (AFAP) Board of Trustees
