= Ali Sheikh Abdullahi =

Somali diplomat

Ali Sheikh Abdullahi (Somali: Cali Sheekh Cabdulaahi, Arabic: علي الشيخ عبد الله) is a Somali diplomat. He is the ambassador of Somalia to Pakistan, based at the Somali embassy in Islamabad.
