= Algeria–Somalia relations =

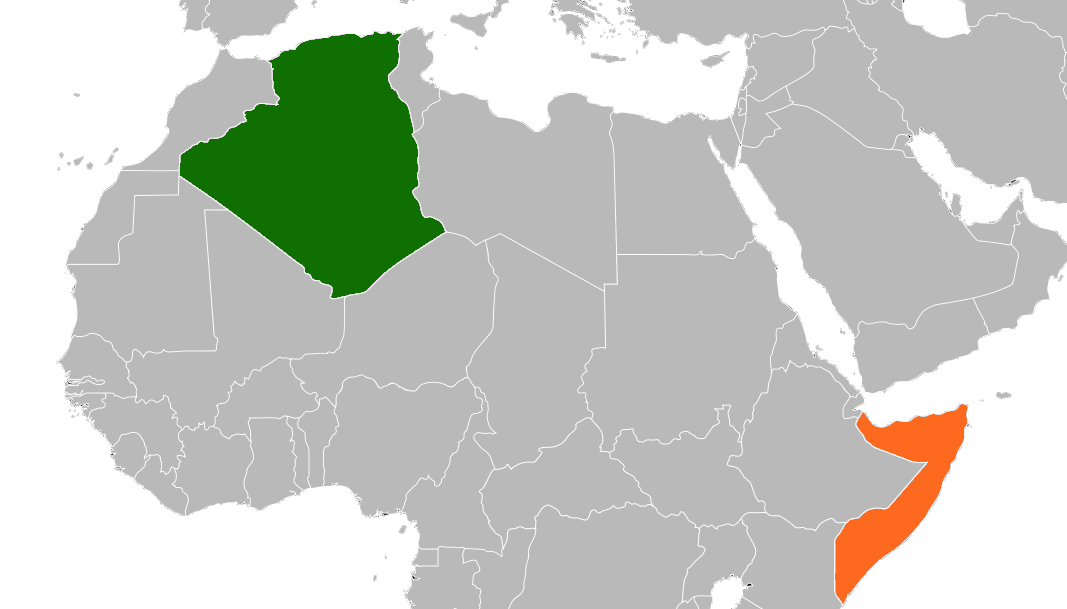
- Algeria: Somalia

Algeria–Somalia relations refer to foreign relations between Algeria and Somalia. Both nations are Arab League, African Union & Organisation of Islamic Cooperation members and maintain cordial relations.

== History ==
Both Algeria and Somalia gained their independence in the early 1960s, initially, both nations had similar viewpoints and ideologies such as third-world cooperation, however both nations formally adopted socialism as a guiding ideology with the ascension of Houari Boumediene and Siad Barre. This would also mean both nations would gain closer relations with the Soviet Union.

Relations between both nations would remain cordial as Somalia supported the Arab coalition in the Yom Kippur War in which Algeria was a belligerent, however relations begin to strain when Somalia began to mobilise its Armed Forces for a potential invasion of Eastern Ethiopia in 1977. Boumediene who had good relations with Ethiopia, the Soviet Union and Somalia, attempted to dissuade Barre for pursuing an invasion, Barre later invaded, captured and annexed the Ogaden, which was later returned to Ethiopia following the Soviet intervention.

Furthermore, relations were strained when Somalia refused to cut ties with Anwar Sadat's Egypt for normalising ties with Israel & Somalia's refusal to recognise Western Sahara in favour of better relations with Morocco which it maintains to this day.

When the Somali government collapsed in 1991, Algeria contributed peacekeepers to UNOSOM II, the second phase of the United Nations Operation in Somalia.

Currently, relations are very warm between the two African nations as Algeria and Somalia maintains fraternal relations and affirms support for one another.

== Diplomatic missions ==
Somalia maintains an embassy in Algiers whereas Algeria does not maintain a diplomatic mission inside or outside Somalia.

== See also ==
- Foreign relations of Algeria
- Foreign relations of Somalia
