= Egypt–Eritrea relations =

- Egypt: Eritrea

Relations between Egypt and Eritrea refer to relations between the Arab Republic of Egypt and the State of Eritrea. Egypt recognized Eritrea shortly after the country became independent in 1991. Eritrea has supported Egypt in disputes pertaining to water rights in the Nile.

Leaders from both countries have met with one another, with Egyptian president Abdel Fattah el-Sisi and Eritrean president Isaias Afwerki meeting in 2024 to discuss security and economic matters.

== History ==
=== 1991-2009 ===
Egypt became of one of the first nations to recognize Eritrea following its independence from Ethiopia on May 24, 1991, from Ethiopia. In 1993, Egypt opened an embassy in the Eritrean capital city of Asmara.

In 2003, it was reported that Egypt "considers the Eritrean government an ally in fulfilling its ambitions as the prominent regional power". The Egyptian government made multiple attempts in 2003 to normalize Eritrea's relations with Sudan, and tried to arrange meetings between Eritrean president Isaias Afwerki and Sudanese president Omar al-Bashir. In 2005, Egyptian president Hosni Mubarak met with Afwerki seeking to halt furthers escalations between Eritrea and Ethiopia.

On March 31, 2009, the governments of Egypt and Eritrea signed a Friendship and Cooperation Agreement. This was followed on December 14, 2009, by a Protocol of Cooperation between Egypt's National Council for Youth and Eritea's National Union of Eritrean Youth and Students.

=== 2010s ===
In 2013, the Eritrean government assured the Egyptian government under Mohamed Morsi that it supported Egypt in its dispute over Nile water rights. Afwerki has visited Egypt on multiple occasions, including in 2014 and 2016. In 2018, Afwerki met with Egyptian president Abdel Fattah el-Sisi amid heightened Red Sea tensions.

=== 2020s ===
Amid the diplomatic dispute between Egypt and Ethiopia over the Grand Ethiopian Renaissance Dam, Afwerki sought to mediate the dispute by visiting the dam in 2020. In October 2023, Egyptian foreign minister Sameh Shoukry met with Eritrean foreign minister Osman Saleh. During the meeting Shoukry "underscored Egypt’s dedication to playing a proactive and positive role in regional affairs" in the Horn of Africa.

Afwerki met with el-Sisi at the presidential palace in Cairo in 2024 to discuss security issues in the Horn of Africa, including in Somalia. During the meeting, both leaders were said to have "reviewed the situation in Sudan" and the Gaza war, as well as to discuss economic matters.
