= Norway–Somalia relations =

- Norway: Somalia

Norway–Somalia relations are the bilateral relations between Norway and Somalia.

== Historical relations ==
Somali immigration to Norway began in the 1970s, with the first Somalis arriving as sailors. After a failed coup in Somalia in 1978, the first refugees came to Norway, followed by more in the 1980s, largely from the Isaaq clan. The Somali Civil War (1991) led to a sharp increase in asylum seekers, particularly from the Hawiye clan. By the mid-2000s, the Somali population in Norway had grown substantially due to factors like high birth rates and family reunification.

Norway's engagement with Somalia began intensifying after its membership in the UN Security Council in 2001–2002, during which it took a leading role in initiatives related to Somalia's peacebuilding and reconciliation. Norway's 2012-2015 strategy aimed to support stability, national reconciliation, and statebuilding in Somalia, focusing on long-term development and humanitarian aid.

== Political relations ==
Somalis in Norway have faced challenges regarding immigration policies, including DNA testing for family reunification. In the late 1990s, blood and later DNA tests were introduced to verify family claims, revealing high levels of fraud.

From 2012, Norway's political focus had been on supporting Somalia's federal government, especially through projects like the Special Financing Facility, which aids government capacity and infrastructure. Norway had supported Somalia's statebuilding and good governance, focusing on political stabilisation, human rights, and gender equality.

In 2015, investigations exposed that some Somali individuals who claimed to be refugees were actually residents of neighboring countries, leading to the revocation of their Norwegian citizenship and a repatriation program to Somalia.

== Economic relations ==
As of 2012–2014, 70.7% of Somalia-born immigrants in Norway had persistently low income, though this declined with longer residence. Despite these challenges, Somalis are among the largest remittance senders to Somalia, contributing $177 million in the first half of 2023 alone. Many Somali immigrants also rely on welfare support, with some families involved in welfare fraud by claiming extra income support.

Norway had been increasing its development aid to Somalia since 2014, with contributions managed from Oslo and Nairobi. Norway's aid focused on stabilizing newly liberated regions, improving governance, and supporting sectors like education, job creation, and sustainable management of natural resources.

== Military relations ==
Norway's military involvement has centered around supporting anti-piracy efforts, stabilising areas recently freed from al-Shabaab, and backing the African Union's peacekeeping missions. Maritime security and counter-terrorism, especially regarding youth radicalisation, have been central to Norway's military strategy in Somalia.

== Cultural relations ==
The Norwegian Somali diaspora plays a crucial role in rebuilding Somalia, contributing to the country's reconstruction through remittances and cultural exchange.

Somali immigrants in Norway also maintain strong cultural ties to their homeland, including the widespread use of the hijab among women as an expression of religiosity and adherence to Somali norms. However, there have been cultural tensions, with some Somali youth sent abroad for "cultural rehabilitation" in Quranic schools, which has sparked debates on integration. Sociological studies show a positive reception towards gender equality among Somalis, although traditional norms regarding honor remain significant.

== Resident diplomatic missions ==
- Norway is accredited to Somalia from its embassy in Nairobi, Kenya.
- Somalia is accredited to Norway from its embassy in Stockholm, Sweden.

== See also ==
- Foreign relations of Norway
- Foreign relations of Somalia
