= Egypt–Ethiopia relations =

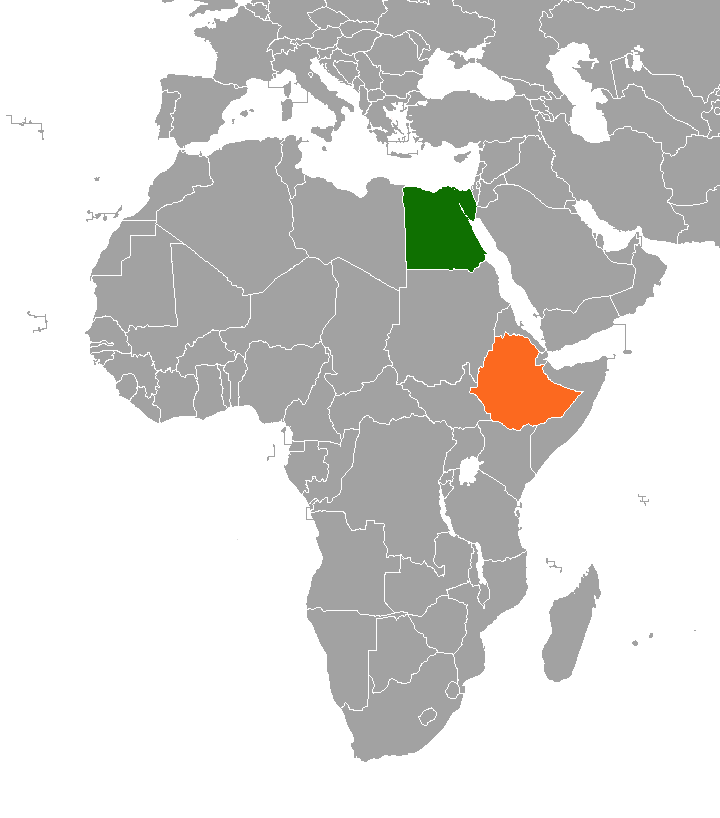

- Egypt: Ethiopia

Egypt–Ethiopia relations are the bilateral relations between the governments of Egypt and Ethiopia. Both countries established diplomatic ties in 1927 to be the oldest on the African continent and one of the oldest in the world. They are both members of the African Union, Nile Basin Initiative and share a relation of special nature due to their crucial roles in vital issues such as the Nile water file and the interest both share on establishing security in the Horn of Africa region by combating terrorism and piracy. In 2021, Ethiopia closed its embassy in Cairo due to financial reasons. In November 2022, Ethiopia reopened its embassy in Cairo. Currently, the relationship is extremely tense because of the Grand Ethiopian Renaissance Dam issue, and Egyptian troops and weapons have been stationed in Somalia, angering Ethiopia. Egypt, for its part, is angry about Ethiopia's unilateral fillings of the dam. Both countries have lodged complaints before the UN on this issue.

== History ==
The first contact between the two people dates back nearly seven thousand years ago when the ancient Egyptians launched their earliest recorded expedition to the Land of Punt under Sahure of the Fifth Dynasty although Punt gold dates back to even earlier times during the rule of King Khufu of the Fourth Dynasty. Ancient Egyptians called this place Ta netjer (The Gods' Land) and viewed it as a mysterious and unknown land of great fortune. They frequently engaged in trade expeditions with their partners in Punt where they acquired gold, incense, ebony, ivory, slaves, exotic animals and skins.

The history of Ethiopian-Egyptian conflict would begin in Medieval Ethiopia when the Christian kingdom and Mamluk Sultanate were in conflict over the persecution of Copts, leadership of Ethiopia's own church, and Mamluk support for Muslim regional enemies. Under the Muhammad Ali Pasha dynasty attempted to modernize and form an Egyptian empire, engaging in many wars, against the Ottomans, the Sudanese and others. The Ethiopian–Ottoman border conflict was an undeclared war between the Ottoman province of Egypt and various Ethiopian warlords occurring soon after the Egyptian conquest of Sudan and as an extension of the greater Ottoman-Ethiopian wars. By the middle of the 19th century, the Ethiopians and Turco-Egyptians faced each other across an undefined and contested border. Muhammad Ali initially entertained the idea of conquering all of Tigray and Amhara, but by the middle of the 19th century Egypt had only limited objectives in Ethiopia, namely to establish its authority over the mineral rich slopes of the Ethiopian peripheral areas. In the 1870s, Egypt invaded Ethiopia resulting in an Ethiopian victory in the resulting Hewett Treaty.

Relations eventually cooled down, and in 1905, Ethiopia first bank was founded in Cairo. During the Second Italian invasion of Ethiopia, Egyptians sympathized with Ethiopia. The Egyptian Red Cross was sent to Ethiopia, while Egyptians denounced the Italian invasion.

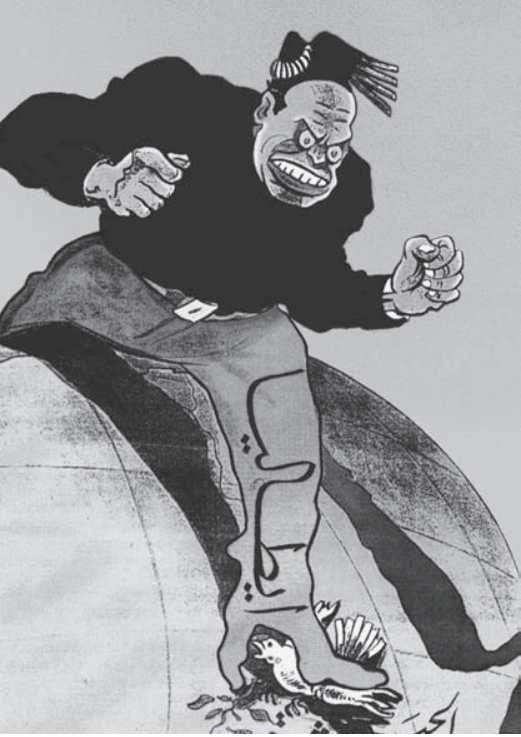
“With His Foot, Mussolini Is Crushing the Dove of Peace.” Al- Musawwar, Sept. 6, 1935, front page.

After World War II, where Egypt and Ethiopia fought for the Allies, Egypt and Ethiopia were founding members of the United Nations. After the 1952 Egyptian revolution, Egypt's pro-British monarchy was replaced with a military junta, eventually consolidating under Gamal Abdel Nasser. As African nations that suffered under colonialism, revolutionary anti-colonialism after World War II led to both states attending the Bandung Conference, a meeting of newly independent African and Asian states. Ethiopia and Egypt were founding members of the Organization of African Unity in 1963. Ethiopian Emperor Haile Selassie visited Cairo in 1959 and 1970.

Two major events in these countries led to a major deterioration in relations. The Ethiopian Revolution overthrow the Selassie government and replaced it with a socialist government ruled by the DERG, and the Corrective Revolution in Egypt, a period of anti-Nasserist purges and the change in Egyptian foreign policy towards the West during the Cold War led by Egyptian president Anwar Sadat. Egypt joined the Safari Club, a clandestine network of anti-communist intelligence services during the Cold War. Egypt covertly supported Somalia during the Ogaden War, a war between Somalia and Ethiopia over the Ogaden region.

Sadat's successor, Hosni Mubarak, sought to repair ties with Ethiopia. Egypt promised neutrality in the Ethiopian civil war

Relations between the two countries began to become strained after the military alliance between Egypt and Somalia.

== Religious relations ==
Religion plays a crucial role in bringing the two countries closer as the Ethiopian Orthodox Tewahedo Church was under the administration of the Coptic Orthodox Church until 1959, when it was appointed its own Patriarch by the Coptic Orthodox Pope of Alexandria and Patriarch of All Africa, Cyril VI. Ethiopian Muslims are also closely attached to Al-Azhar in Cairo, where they have their own column to study under, named Al-Jabarta Column, under which numerous scholars studied such as Shaykh Abdurahman al-Jabarti.

== Economic relations ==
In 1905, the National Bank of Egypt helped establish Ethiopia's first ever bank, “The Bank of Abyssinia” which operated as an affiliate of the NBE, it received a 50-year monopoly and was the Ethiopian government's fiscal agent as well as the sole issuer of notes and was responsible for collecting deposits and granting loans as well as trading in gold and silver, stockpiling staple commodities and investments. In a sense, it operated as both a central and a commercial bank until 1930 when it was handed over to the Ethiopian government after Haile Selassie's ascension to the throne who could not accept that the country's issuing bank was foreign-owned. A new government-controlled bank, the Bank of Ethiopia, was installed in 1931 and kept management and almost all staff, premises and clients of the old bank until the Italian invasion in 1936 when it was liquidated.

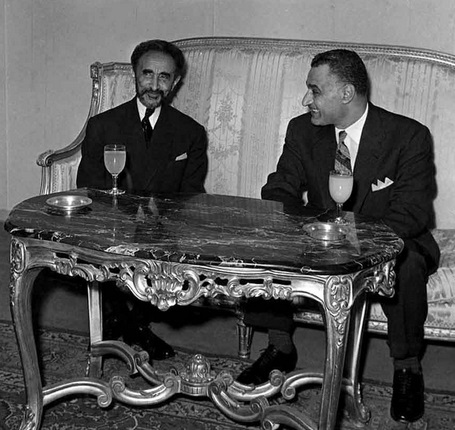
Emperor Haile Selassie I of Ethiopia and President Gamal Abdel Nasser of Egypt in Addis Ababa for the Organisation of African Unity summit

Today, there are over 72 Egyptian investments projects in Ethiopia in the fields of agriculture, livestock production, industry, tourism and real estate. Another project under implementation is an Egyptian industrial zone in the city of Adama, about 90 km from the capital Addis Ababa. Also, the Arab Contractors company opened an office in the country. Below is statistical data showing the significant development of trade between the two countries between 2007 and 2009 in million US dollars of value:

Statement/Year	2007	2008	2009
Egyptian exports to Ethiopia	87.4	93.2	129.2
Egyptian imports from Ethiopia	7.5	13.4	16.9
Volume of Trade	94.9	106.6	146.1
Trade Balance	79.9	79.8	112.3
Source: Ethiopian Customs Authority

== Nile water dispute ==
Ethiopia accused Egypt of using the 1929 Nile Waters Agreement signed between Egypt and the United Kingdom to justify unilateral control over the Nile river in Nile Basin countries, awarding Egypt the right to veto any project that it deems threatening to its water share. The 1959 Nile Waters agreement between Egypt and Sudan called for the “for the full utilization of the Nile waters” and raised the Nile's water allocation for Egypt from 48 billion cubic meters to 55.5 billion cubic meters. Ethiopia was not a party to these agreements and instead negotiated the Cooperative Framework Agreement with other Nile Basin countries which Egypt rejected.More recently, Ethiopia announced the Grand Ethiopian Renaissance Dam (GERD) project, claiming that would allow it to better exploit its water resources, rejecting the old treaty and stressing that it wasn't a member back then. According to the Egyptian authorities, the dam, if built, would become existential threat to 100 million Egyptians.

Sameh Shoukry, Minister for Foreign Affairs of Egypt, has also complained that even though Cairo initiated and engaged in painstaking negotiations on the dam to reach a fair and just agreement, those efforts “came to naught”.

Ethiopia turned down several requests from Egypt and Sudan to negotiate a binding agreement, furthering tensions between the two countries. The resulting dispute over the GERD has soured recent relations, with Egypt threatening war over Ethiopia.

In September 2025, Ethiopia began producing electricity at a large scale, as it officially opened the dam, reaching a capacity over 5,150 megawatts. The project that was mainly sponsored by the Ethiopian government and public donations, aims to boost the country's economy and energy. But this action has increased the tension with Egypt, seeing both countries ready for a long dispute over Nile waters. Egypt has yet to release direct threats at Ethiopia, but sources claim that an armed conflict will cause great damage, mainly floods with devastating effects if the dam is hit. As of now, both sides seek a diplomatic solutions, as international pressure is forced on them, while holding military readiness for a possible conflict.

== See also ==
- Egypt–Somalia relations
