= North Korea–Somalia relations =

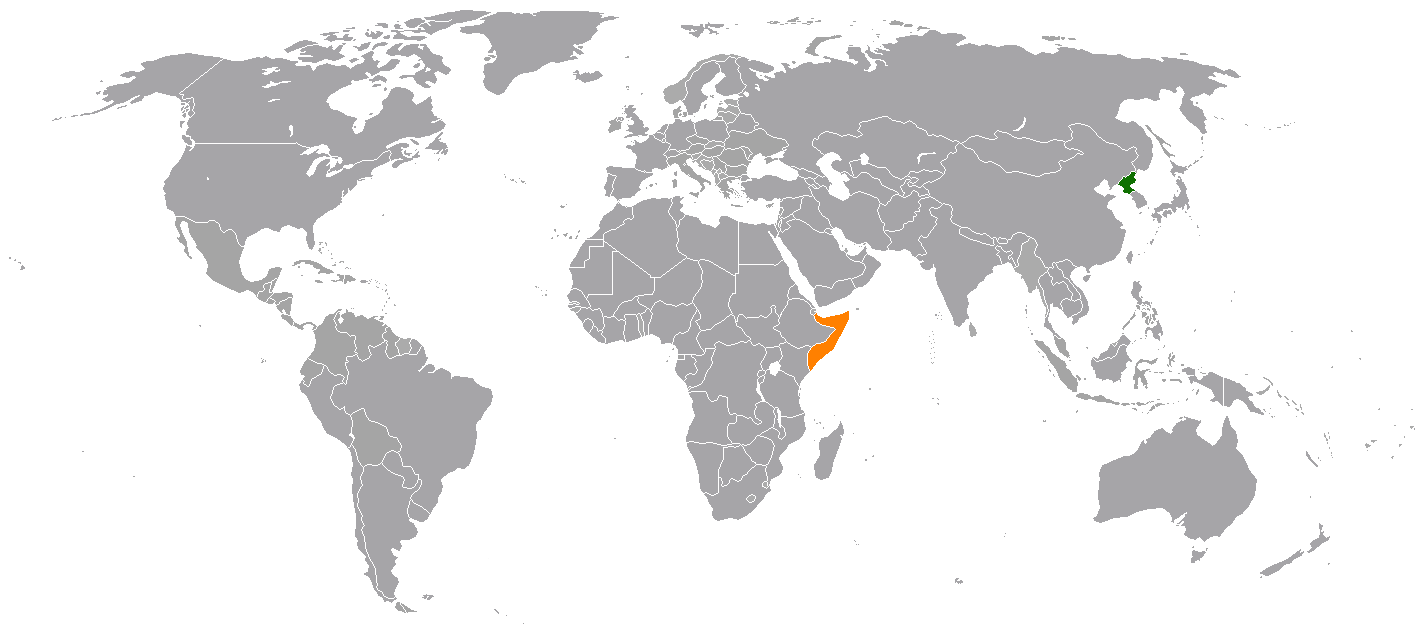

- North Korea: Somalia

North Korea–Somalia relations (Korean: 소말리아-조선민주주의인민공화국 관계) refers to bilateral relations between North Korea and Somalia.

== Overview and history ==
Diplomatic relations between the Democratic People's Republic of Korea (commonly known as North Korea) and Somalia were formally established on 13 April 1967. This late-1950s to 1960s period was when North Korea had first declared autonomous diplomacy.

During the Somali Democratic Republic, relations with North Korea were close, due to shared ideals and geopolitical interests. Both countries formally adhered to anti-imperialism and Marxism–Leninism, and were aligned with the Soviet Union in the context of the wider Cold War. The Supreme Revolutionary Council established relations with the DPRK in 1970. President of Somalia Siad Barre made two visits to Pyongyang during his tenure, once in 1971. He then met with Kim Il Sung, and signed a bilateral agreement of technical and economic assistance. In 1972, Kim awarded Barre the Order of the National Flag.

Over the following years, military cooperation intensified, with North Korea training and equipping the Somali Armed Forces. Additionally, due to a resentment against Ethiopia over the country's involvement in the Korean War, North Korean advisers trained pro-Somalia guerrilla forces active in the Ethiopian–Somali conflict. This changed considerably after the communist Derg came to power in 1974, causing an eventual realignment of Soviet support towards Ethiopia. North Korea followed suit, and provided military aid to Ethiopia against Somalia during the Ethio-Somali War.

As of March 2014, North Korea and Somalia still officially maintain diplomatic relations according to the National Committee on North Korea.

== See also ==
- Foreign relations of North Korea
- Foreign relations of Somalia
- Somalia–South Korea relations
- Dai Hong Dan incident
