= Kenya–Somalia relations =

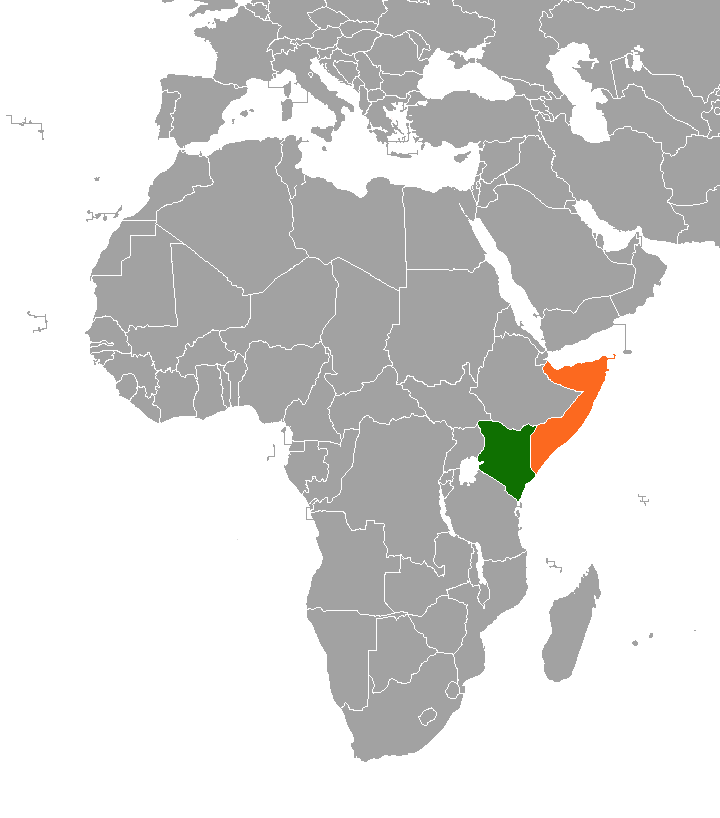
- Kenya: Somalia

Kenya–Somalia relations are bilateral relations between Kenya and Somalia. Both countries are members of the African Union and Non-Aligned Movement.

== Historical relations ==
=== Northern Frontier District ===
On June 26, 1960, four days before granting British Somaliland independence, the British colonial government suggested that all Somali-inhabited areas of East Africa be unified into one administrative region. However, after the dissolution of the former British colonies in the region, the colonial government granted administration of the Northern Frontier District to Kenya despite an informal plebiscite demonstrating the overwhelming desire of the region's population to join the newly formed Somali Republic.

On the eve of Kenya's independence in August 1963, British officials were notified that the new Kenyan administration was not willing to give up the NFD area it had just been granted administration of. Led by the Northern Province People's Progressive Party (NPPPP), some Somalis in the NFD vigorously sought union with the Somali Republic to the north. In response, the Kenyan government enacted a number of measures designed to subdue the rebellion in what came to be known as the Shifta War. The conflict ended in a cease-fire, after an Organisation of African Unity summit was held in Kinshasa and Kenyan and Somalian delegates decided to reach an agreement on the fate of the NFD. This resulted in another summit held in Arusha, Tanzania on 28 October under the chairmanship of Zambian President Kenneth Kaunda. The governments of both countries signed a memorandum of understanding that entailed the suspension of states of emergency in Kenya and Somalia and the full resumption of diplomatic and economic ties between both countries.

Somalis in Kenya have historically inhabited the Northern Frontier District (NFD), which was later renamed the North Eastern Province. The NFD came into being in 1925, when it was carved out of the Jubaland region in present-day southern Somalia. At the time under British colonial administration, the northern half of Jubaland was ceded to Italy as a reward for the Italians' support of the Allies during World War I. Britain retained control of the southern half of the territory, which was later called the Northern Frontier District. From the 2010s onwards, during the administration of Ahmed Madobe, ties between Kenya and Jubaland have deepened, particularly in the form of economic and military cooperation.

== Military relations ==
=== 2025 border-related clashes ===
On 23 March 2025, six Kenyan police personnel were killed and four others injured in a dawn attack by al-Shabaab militants on a police camp in Garissa County, near the Somalia-Kenya border. Al-Shabaab, a group linked to al-Qaeda, frequently carries out cross-border assaults targeting both military and civilian sites. This attack occurred a week after the U.S. embassy warned travelers about the security risks in the area. Al-Shabab has been engaged in an ongoing insurgency in Somalia, seeking to establish an Islamic state under Sharia law. This attack followed several other recent incidents, including a bombing near Somalia's presidential palace and an assault on a hotel in central Somalia earlier in March.

On 29 April 2025, al-Shabaab militants killed five Kenyan quarry workers and injured two others in Mandera County, near the Kenya-Somalia border. According to a Kenyan police report, around ten gunmen ambushed a minibus near Bur Abor village at approximately 6 a.m. local time, forcing the workers out of the vehicle before executing them. The attackers reportedly demanded the victims' phones and identification before opening fire. The militants' tracks were believed to have led toward the Somali border. Thirteen others escaped into nearby bushland and were later rescued.

=== Operation Linda Nchi ===
In October 2011, a coordinated operation between the Somali military and the Kenyan military, Operation Linda Nchi, began against the Al-Shabaab group of insurgents in southern Somalia. The mission was officially led by the Somali army, with the Kenyan forces providing a support role. In early June 2012, Kenyan troops were formally integrated into AMISOM. By September 2012, the Somali National Army and allied Kenyan African Union forces and Raskamboni militia had managed to capture Al-Shabaab's last major stronghold, the southern port of Kismayo, during the Battle of Kismayo.

== Cultural relations ==
=== Refugee camps ===
In 2013, UNHCR, the governments of Kenya and Somalia signed a tripartite agreement facilitating the repatriation of Somali refugees at the Dadaab camp. In March 2021 the Kenyan government issued an ultimatum to UNHCR to close Dadaab and Kakuma refugee camps, which house over 400,000 mostly Somali refugees. Amid the deteriorating relationship with the Somali government they have said there is no room for further negotiations, the Somali refugees should leave the camps with immediate effect and that they will be escorted to the Somali border if the camps are not closed. This could result in a humanitarian catastrophe particularly due to the COVID-19 pandemic. The Somali government has not issued any statement about the impending closures.

Early in the month, UNHCR had appealed for urgent funding for refugees in East Africa, reporting that food rations for the refugees in Kenya had already been cut by 40%. Funding has reached an all-time low due to the global impact of COVID-19. Clementine Nkweta-Salami, UNHCR's Regional Director said "Protection concerns are growing. Food ration or cash cuts are resulting in negative coping strategies to meet their basic food needs – such as skipping or reducing meals, taking loans with high interest, selling assets, child labour, and increased domestic violence."

== Political relations ==
=== Maritime boundary dispute ===
Kenya and Somalia are involved in a maritime boundary dispute in the northern part of the Indian Ocean. As ratified members of the United Nations Convention on the Law of the Sea (UNCLOS), Kenya and Somalia are under the obligation to delimit their maritime boundaries by agreement based on international law for achieving a fair solution, in accordance with the article 83(1). Both countries have overlapping claims. The main point of disagreement is the method by which the delimitation of the maritime boundary should be established, as article 83(1) of UNCLOS does not specify a delimitation method. While Somalia considers the boundary should be following the equidistant line from the land border, Kenya advocates for a boundary based on the line along the parallel crossing the starting point of the land boundary.

On April 7, 2009, a Memorandum of Understanding (MoU) was signed "between the Government of the Republic of Kenya and the Transitional Federal Government of the Somali Republic to grant to each other No-Objection in respect of submissions on the Outer Limits of the Continental Shelf beyond 200nm to the Commission on the Limits of the Continental Shelf (CLCS)". In this document, both countries recognised the existence of the maritime boundary dispute, and agreed to solve the said dispute through negotiation. The MoU was signed by the Kenyan Minister of Foreign Affairs and the Somalian Minister for National Planning and International Cooperation. However, this MoU was later rejected by the Transitional Federal Parliament of Somalia in October 2009 on the grounds that it was not customary that a Minister signed a binding bilateral agreement, thus declaring it void and non-actionable. Somalia's objection led the CLCS to make no further consideration of Kenya's submission.

On August 28, 2014, following unfruitful negotiations and alleged sovereignty violations by Kenya, Somalia filed an application to the International Court of Justice (ICJ) for the determination of a single course of a maritime boundary, including the continental shelf beyond 200 nm. In 2015, Kenya raised two preliminary objections to the case in regards to the Court's jurisdiction. The first is based on the claim that the instrument to solve the dispute was the previously signed MoU and that any delimitation shall be made after the CLCS has examined the submissions made by the parties. The second objection is based on Kenya's allegation of both parties have agreed to a method of settlement other than recourse to the Court, under the optional clause declaration (Art. 36, paragraph 2) of the ICJ Statute and Part XV of UNCLOS. Nevertheless, the ICJ ruled over these two objections and took over the case, on February 2, 2017, explicitly upholding its jurisdiction on a case for the first time.

Public hearings on the case were to be held in 2019 but were postponed to 2020 and 2021 as per requested by Kenya. However, Kenya declined to attend the ICJ hearings on the case in March 2021, saying in a statement that the country felt betrayed by the Somali government which had "incited hostility against Kenya, and actively contributed to the climate that encourages attacks against Kenyan civilians and against Kenyan forces in Somalia" despite the support Kenya had given Somalia in terms of humanitarian aid and military, financial and diplomatic support.

On October 12, 2021, the ICJ delivered its judgement. The Court concluded that, contrary to Kenya's allegations, there is no existence of a previously agreed boundary in latitude terms, and divided the 100.000 square kilometres in dispute among the parts with a new maritime boundary. However, Kenya still refuses to recognize the Court's jurisdiction on the case, and the effects of the judgement remain unclear as the ICJ has no means to enforce its rulings. Nevertheless, the ruling will most likely raise the tensions to a new level, affecting several cooperation efforts, especially in terms of maritime security issues in the area such as piracy, among others. Moreover, Kenya could be expected to pay reparations for its oil and gas exploration and exploitation activities in the territory now ruled to belong to Somalia.

=== Tensions along with the dispute ===
The disputed area between Somalia and Kenya has an important concentration of oil and gas deposits. Both countries have made concessions to private companies for the exploration and extraction of these resources before the dispute was settled. In 2019, Kenya signed agreements with Qatar Petroleum, Eni, an Italian company, and Total, a French company. At the same time, Somalia has also established concessions with companies for different activities in the disputed area. However, Kenya's actions allowed it to allege unlawful operations in its territory, leading to the application to the ICJ. Somalia also protested against Kenya's works in the disputed area several times. On one of the occasions, the Attorney General of Somalia addressed his concerns over the violation of Somalia's sovereignty through a complaint to the CEO of Total Oil Company.

In the media, both countries are portrayed differently in relation to the dispute and some news portals are accused of contributing to the tensions in the dispute due to their coverage of it. As an example, in 2019, Al Jazeera speculated about the possible interference of the ICJ Judge Abdulqawi Ahmed Yussuf, a Somalian national, in the case.

In terms of diplomacy, the tensions were latent as in February 2019, Kenya summoned its ambassador to Somalia back home and asked his Somalia counterpart Mohammed Muhamud Nur to return to Mogadishu for consultation with his government after the Somali government's decision to auction oil and gas exploration blocks at the centre of the two countries' maritime territorial dispute in the Indian Ocean. In the middle of the dead heat between the countries, in July 2019, Somalia lodged a protest to the Kenyan government for referring to the self-proclaimed Somaliland as a country. Additionally, in February 2021, the chairman of the Pan African Forum sought United Nations intervention over the Kenya-Somalia maritime case at the International Court of Justice. In his letter to António Guterres, the Secretary-General of the United Nations, he said that since Mohamed took over power tensions in the region had accelerated, "Farmaajo seems to be in a predicament due to the undue pressure by external forces, namely Turkey, UAE and Qatar, Norway and to some extent France." The Council of Presidential Candidates accused President Mohamed, and Abdirahman Beyle of attempting to auction off Somalia's oil blocks, despite the fact that laws governing natural resources and revenue sharing had not been agreed upon by the Federal Government of Somalia and the Federal Member States.

=== Diplomatic row with President Mohamed ===
In December 2020 Mohamed accused Kenya of interference in Somalia's internal affairs in a diplomatic row which resulted in Somalia cutting diplomatic ties with neighbouring Kenya, giving Kenyan diplomats seven days to leave Mogadishu. The Kenyan government denied the allegations claiming that the Somali government is ungrateful to Kenya for the support her country has provided to Somali refugees and its efforts to bring peace to Somalia'. In May 2021, relations between the two countries were restored, with mediation from Qatar.

== Diplomatic missions ==
The Federal Government of Somalia maintains an embassy in Nairobi. The diplomatic mission is led by Ambassador Jamal Mohamed Hassan.

== See also ==
- Foreign relations of Kenya
- Foreign relations of Somalia
