= List of diplomatic missions in Somalia =

This is a list of diplomatic missions in Somalia.

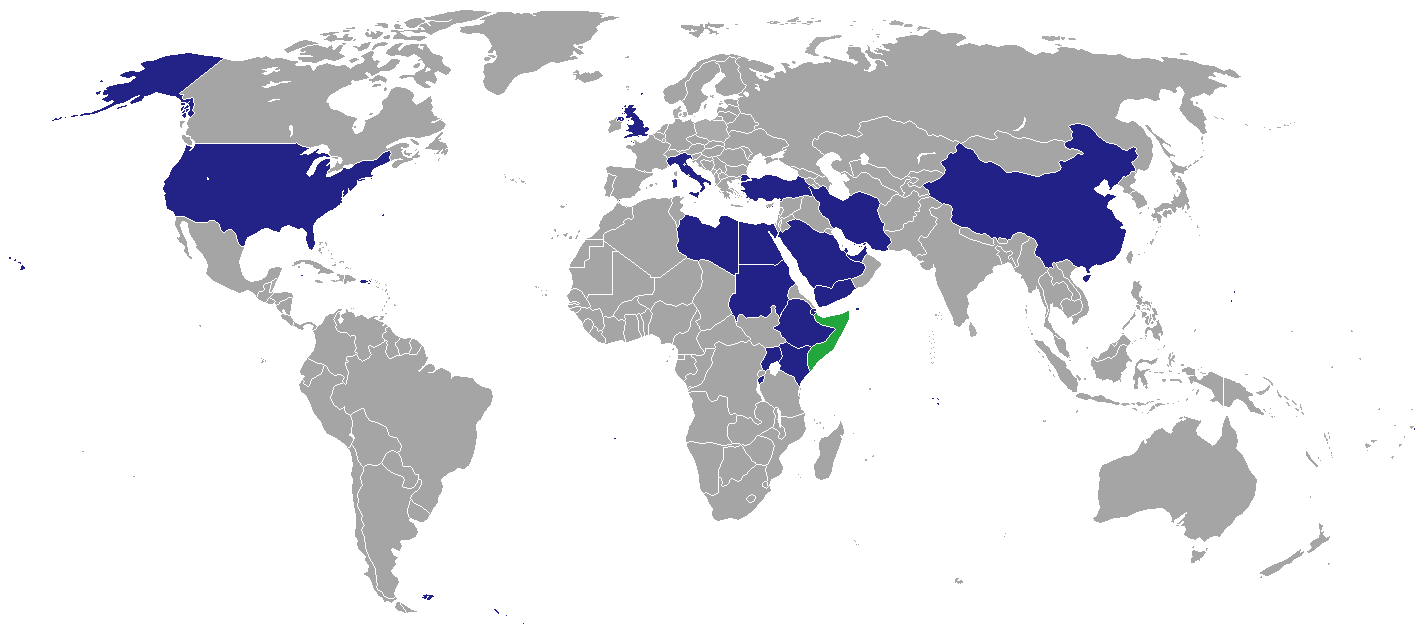
Diplomatic missions in Somalia

== Embassies in Mogadishu ==
1. Algeria
2. China
3. Djibouti
4. Egypt
5. Ethiopia
6. Italy
7. Kenya
8. Libya
9. Oman
10. Qatar
11. Saudi Arabia
12. Sudan
13. Turkey
14. Uganda
15. United Kingdom (details)
16. United States (details)
17. Yemen

=== Gallery ===
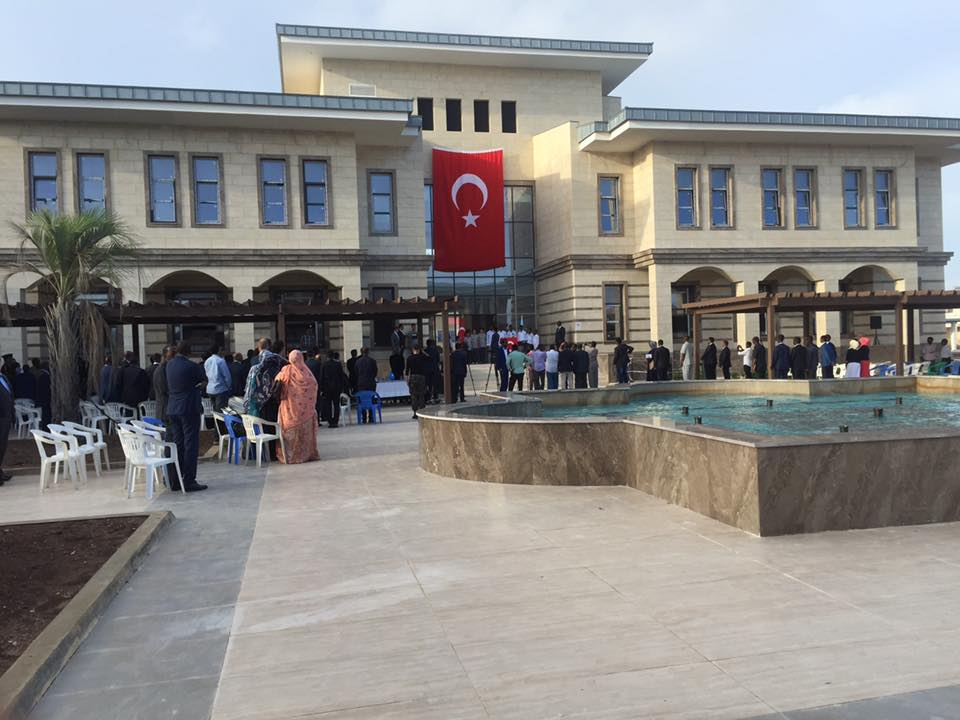
Embassy of Turkey

== Consulate-General in Garoowe ==
- Ethiopia

== Closed embassies ==
Host city	Sending country	Mission	Year closed	Ref.
Mogadishu	Burundi	Embassy	Unknown	
Mogadishu	Canada	Embassy	1990	
Mogadishu	Czechoslovakia	Embassy (Note: Czech resident in Addis Ababa, Ethiopia and a Slovak resident in Nairobi, Kenya)	1969	
Mogadishu	Cuba	Embassy	1977	
Mogadishu	France	Embassy	1990	
Mogadishu	Hungary	Embassy	Unknown	
Mogadishu	India	Embassy	2011	
Mogadishu	Indonesia	Embassy	1967	
Mogadishu	Iran	Embassy	2016	
Mogadishu	Iraq	Embassy	Unknown	
Mogadishu	Kuwait	Embassy	1991	
Mogadishu	Pakistan	Embassy	Unknown	
Mogadishu	Romania	Embassy	1991	
Mogadishu	Russia	Embassy	1992	
Mogadishu	South Korea	Embassy	1992	
Mogadishu	United Arab Emirates	Embassy	2026	
Mogadishu	Yugoslavia	Embassy (Note: Serbian resident in Nairobi, Kenya and a Croatian resident in Cairo, Egypt)	Unknown	

== Non-resident embassies ==
=== Resident in Addis Ababa, Ethiopia ===
- Benin
- Bulgaria
- Burundi
- Central African Republic
- Czechoslovakia
- Cameroon
- Colombia
- Czechia
- Equatorial Guinea
- Georgia
- Ghana
- Guinea
- Kazakhstan
- Lesotho
- Mali
- Mauritius
- Mexico
- Myanmar
- Nigeria
- Portugal
- Romania
- Senegal
- Seychelles
- South Africa
- Sri Lanka
- Togo

=== Resident in Nairobi, Kenya ===
- Argentina
- Australia
- Austria
- Bangladesh
- Belgium
- Brazil
- Canada
- Denmark
- Finland
- France
- Germany
- Greece
- India
- Indonesia
- Ireland
- Japan
- Netherlands
- Norway
- Philippines
- Poland
- Serbia
- Sierra Leone
- South Korea
- Slovakia
- Spain
- Sweden
- Switzerland
- Tanzania
- Thailand
- Ukraine
- Venezuela
- Zimbabwe

=== Resident elsewhere ===
- Bahrain (Muscat)
- Croatia (Cairo)
- Haiti (Pretoria)
- Jamaica (Pretoria)
- Maldives (Riyadh)
- Malaysia (Khartoum)
- Pakistan (Djibouti City)
- Palestine (Djibouti City)
- Russia (Djibouti City)
- Taiwan (Pretoria)
- Tunisia (Sana'a)
- Vietnam (Dar-Es-Salaam)

== See also ==
- Foreign relations of Somalia
- List of diplomatic missions of Somalia
- List of diplomatic missions in Somaliland
