= Somalia–United Arab Emirates relations =

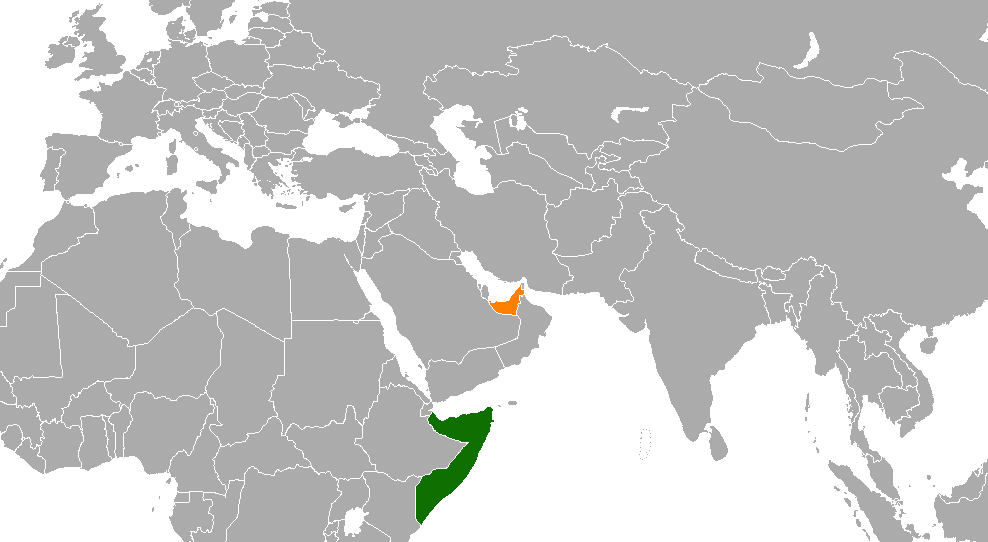

- Somalia: United Arab Emirates

Somalia–United Arab Emirates relations are bilateral relations between Somalia and the United Arab Emirates (UAE). Both nations are Arab League members and used to engage in close development cooperation. Somalia also has an embassy in Abu Dhabi, and the UAE maintains an embassy in Mogadishu.

On 19 November 2026, Somalia decided to expel the Emirati ambassador and to recall its envoy from Abu Dhabi on the grounds of interference in its affairs, the sowing of discord, and the infringement of its sovereignty.

== Overview ==
Relations between the territories of present-day Somalia and the United Arab Emirates stretch back to antiquity. The 1st century CE Periplus of the Erythraean Sea, among other documents, reports early commercial exchanges between traders inhabiting city-states on the northern Somalia littoral with Himyarite and Sabaean merchants, who controlled much of the Arabian Peninsula. During the Middle Ages and early modern period, the various Somali Sultanates also maintained close relations with other kingdoms across the Red Sea.

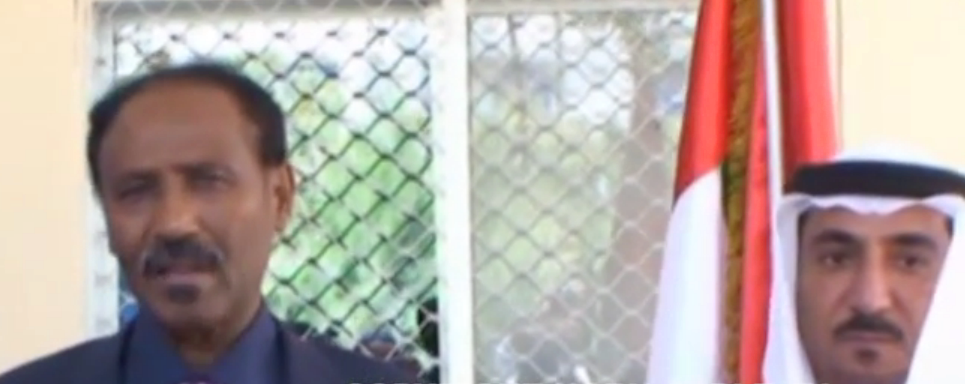
Minister of Foreign Affairs of Somalia Abdirahman Duale Beyle meeting with the UAE ambassador to Somalia Mohamed Al-Osmani in Mogadishu.

After the start of the civil war in Somalia in 1991, the UAE maintained diplomatic relations with the Somali Transitional National Government and its successor the Transitional Federal Government, and supported their government initiatives. The UAE has also officially supported the Puntland Maritime Police Force since the military body's formation in 2010.

The subsequent establishment of the Federal Government of Somalia in August 2012 was welcomed by the Emirati authorities, who re-affirmed the UAE's continued support for Somalia's government, its territorial integrity and sovereignty.

In May 2019, a U.S. senator blamed the UAE for fostering conflict in Somalia, in particularly by nurturing animosity between Somalia's regional states (such as Jubaland, Puntland) and the central government, particularly by signing separate economic deals, such as coastal ports. DP World operates the Port of Berbera in Somaliland. The UAE has announced intentions to open a military base in Somaliland.

== Development cooperation ==
In March 2014, Prime Minister of Somalia Abdiweli Sheikh Ahmed began an official three-day visit to the United Arab Emirates to discuss strengthening bilateral cooperation between the two nations. During talks with UAE deputy prime minister and minister of presidential affairs Sheikh Mansour bin Zayed bin Sultan Al Nahyan, the Emirati authorities emphasized their commitment to the ongoing post-conflict reconstruction process in Somalia. They also pledged to assist in capacity building and the rehabilitation of government institutions.

In January 2015, new prime minister of Somalia Omar Abdirashid Ali Sharmarke met with the United Arab Emirates Ambassador to Somalia Mohammed Ahmed Othman Al Hammadi at his Mogadishu office. The officials touched on various matters of bilateral interest, including military operations, governmental re-institutionalization, maritime security, and the local reconstruction process. Sharmarke noted the longstanding and close relationship between the territories of Somalia and the UAE. Ambassador Al Hammadi in turn pledged that the Emirati authorities would support the ongoing developmental activities in Somalia.

In March 2015, Foreign Affairs Minister of Somalia Abdisalam Omer met with the Foreign Affairs Minister of the United Arab Emirates Abdullah bin Zayed Al Nahyan in Abu Dhabi. The two leaders touched on various bilateral matters, including strengthening collaboration and cooperation in the security sector, among other areas. They also evaluated ongoing mutual projects and discussed the political situation in Somalia. Omer in turn commended the Emirati government for its various development initiatives in Somalia, and applauded the UAE's commitment to the reconstruction process therein.

== Military cooperation ==
The United Arab Emirates trained hundreds of Somali troops since 2014. The UAE had been paying the salaries of several hundred Somali soldiers, and trained an anti-piracy force in Puntland state of Somalia. The training mission ended after Somali police seized money in three unmarked bags on a Royal Jet plane at the Aden Adde International Airport in Mogadishu, according to the Somali interior ministry.

The Somali government announced on Wednesday April 11, 2018, that it will take over paying and training the soldiers in the programme, Defence Minister Mohamed Mursal Abdirahman told Somalia's state news agency Sonna.

"Somalia will fully take over [its troops] trained by the UAE... Those forces will be added to the various battalions of the Somalia National Army," Abdirahman said, adding the soldiers would be integrated into other units on Thursday.

== Agreements ==
In late March 2013, Foreign Minister of Somalia Fowziya Yusuf Haji Adan and her Emirati counterpart Sheikh Abdullah bin Zayed Al Nahyan signed a memorandum of understanding on bilateral cooperation. The agreement re-establishes formal diplomatic ties between Somalia and the UAE, and also focuses on the political, security, economic, investment and development sectors. Additionally, the Emirati government announced that it would re-open its embassy in Mogadishu.

In November 2014, Somalia and the United Arab Emirates signed a memorandum of understanding to enhance military cooperation.

== Economic relations ==
In April 2025, Somalia signed a $306.5 million debt relief agreement with the Abu Dhabi-based Arab Monetary Fund (AMF), marking a significant step in its ongoing economic reform programme. The deal, signed in Kuwait, restructures Somalia’s debt to the AMF and follows the 2024 cancellation of 99% of Somalia’s debt by the Paris Club. Somalia’s finance minister described the agreement as fundamental to re-engaging with international financial institutions. The AMF, which supports economic development among Arab states, highlighted the deal as part of broader efforts to stabilize Somalia’s post-conflict economy.

== Diplomatic missions ==
The Somali Federal Government maintains an embassy in Abu Dhabi. The diplomatic mission is led by Ambassador AbdulKadir Sheikhey Al-Hatimi.

The United Arab Emirates' embassy in Mogadishu is headed by Ambassador Mohammed Ahmed Othman Al Hammadi.

== See also ==
- Foreign relations of the United Arab Emirates
- Foreign relations of Somalia
