= Qatar–Somalia relations =

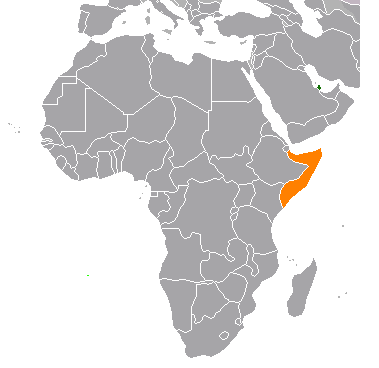

- Qatar: Somalia

Qatar–Somalia relations are the bilateral relations between Qatar and Somalia. The two countries formally established relations in 1970 and are both members of the Arab League and Organisation of Islamic Cooperation.

== Overview ==
The two countries formally established diplomatic ties in 1970. Qatar supported and welcomed the outcome of the Somali National Reconciliation Conference held in Djibouti in September 2000. Furthermore, it supported reconciliation conferences held in both Khartoum and Djibouti to end the political and security crises affecting Somalia.

== Development cooperation ==
In March 2015, Prime Minister Omar Abdirashid Ali Sharmarke led talks with the Prime Minister of Qatar, Abdullah bin Nasser bin Khalifa Al Thani. The gathering focused on strengthening investment, commerce, and governance ties between both territories, with an emphasis on stabilization initiatives. It concluded with a signed cooperative agreement in the civil aviation and education sectors. According to Sharmarke, the treaty aims to accelerate the ongoing reconstruction and development process in Somalia and to buttress local job creation. Among the agreement's stipulations, Qatar Airways is scheduled to launch direct flights to the Aden Adde International Airport in Mogadishu.

In August 2019, Qatar launched a project to build a new port in Hobyo, a central town in Somalia. Qatar stated that the project would benefit the people of Somalia. The Ministry of Ports (Somalia) said “the launching of the project to build the port of Hobyo will create job opportunities for the Somali citizens and contribute to the economy of the country.”

== Agreements ==
A labor agreement on the recruitment of Somali workers in the State of Qatar was signed in 1983.

== Military Cooperation ==
In January 2026, the Federal Republic of Somalia and the State of Qatar signed a defence cooperation agreement in Doha aimed at deepening military ties and enhancing security coordination between the two countries.

The agreement was signed by Somalia’s Minister of Defence, Ahmed Moalim Fiqi, and Qatar’s Deputy Prime Minister and Minister of State for Defence Affairs, Sheikh Saoud bin Abdulrahman bin Hassan Al Thani, on the sidelines of the Doha International Maritime Defence Exhibition and Conference] (DIMDEX 2026).

The pact focuses on military training, the exchange of expertise, the development of defence capabilities, and enhanced cooperation in security and defence matters to support efforts to promote regional security and stability. The signing ceremony was attended by senior military officials from both states, reflecting growing strategic ties and a shared commitment to reinforcing bilateral defence partnerships.

== Diplomatic missions ==
The Federal Republic of Somalia maintains an embassy in Doha. The diplomatic mission is led by Ambassador Abdirizak Farah Ali. Qatar also has an embassy in Mogadishu, led by Ambassador Hasan Bin Hamza Asad Mohammed.

== Qatari influence on Somali politics ==
Qatar is the main backer of Somali President Mohamed Abdullahi Mohamed. Qatari money is alleged to have influenced the 2012 and 2017 election outcomes through bribery, as well as attempts to remove Somali Federal State leaders who did not cooperate with the Qatar. There have also been allegations that Qatar has ties to Al-Shabaab. These issues are said to have had a destabilizing influence in Somalia which the West has 'turned a blind eye' to.

== See also ==
- Foreign relations of Somalia
- Foreign relations of Qatar
