= Somalia–South Korea relations =

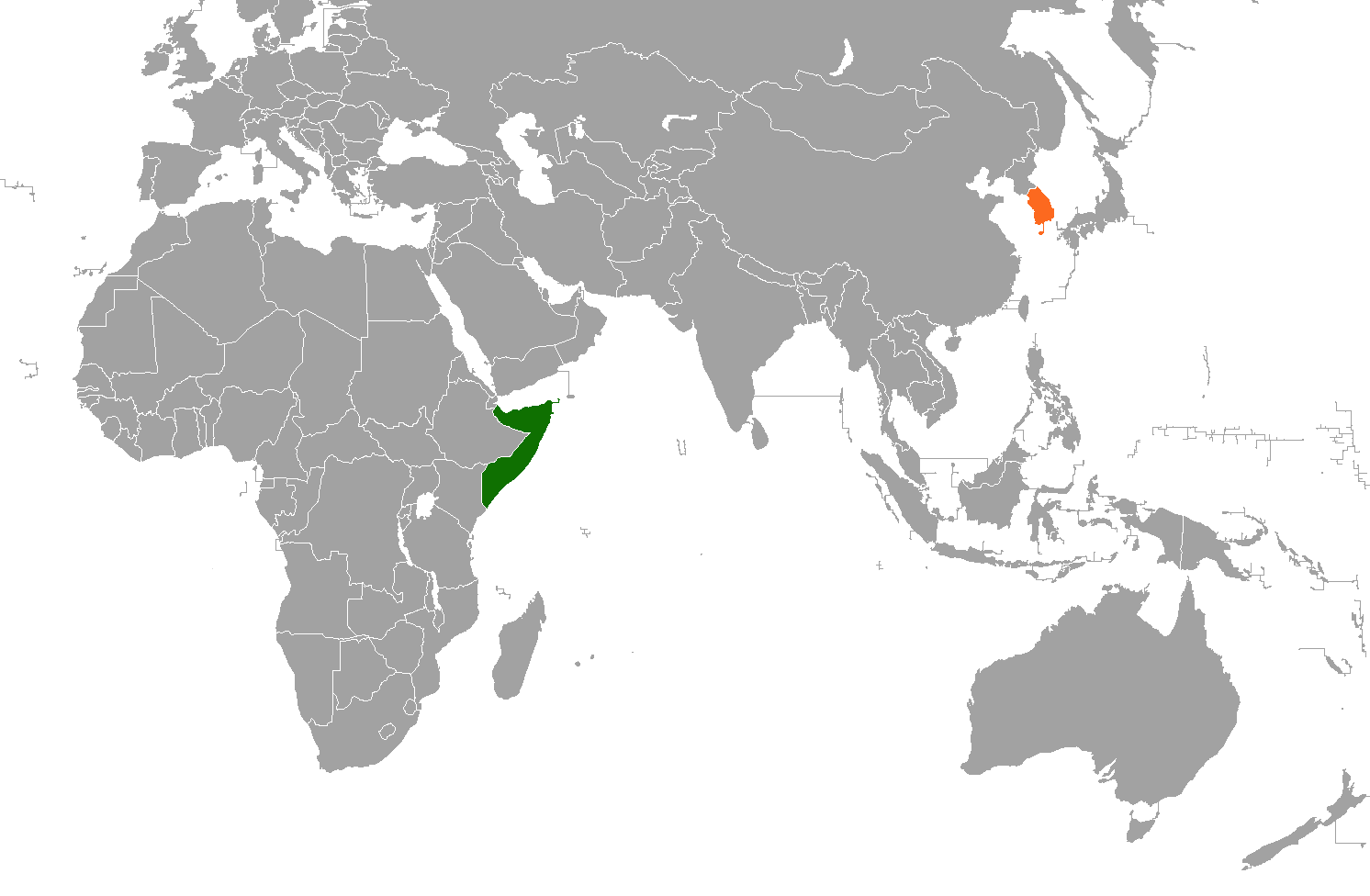
- Somalia: South Korea

Somalia–South Korea relations are bilateral relations between Somalia and South Korea. Diplomatic ties were first established on 25 September 1987.

== History ==
South Korea officially recognizes and maintains diplomatic ties with the Federal Government of Somalia. In May 2013, Somali President Hassan Sheikh Mohamud accepted the credentials of the new South Korean Ambassador to Mogadishu, Kim Chan-Woo, the first diplomatic representative of an Asian Pacific country to work in Somalia in many years. Chan-Woo also announced that South Korea would re-open its embassy in the Somali capital. Additionally, the Ambassador indicated that his administration would support the Somali government's ongoing reconstruction efforts, in the process making use of South Korea's own experience in post-conflict rehabilitation and development gained from the Korean War. He also asserted that his administration would once again launch agricultural and technical projects in Somalia, as the South Korean authorities had done in the past.

== Resident diplomatic missions ==
- Somalia is accredited to South Korea from its embassy in Jakarta, Indonesia.
- South Korea is accredited to Somalia from its embassy in Nairobi, Kenya.

== See also ==
- Foreign relations of Somalia
- Foreign relations of South Korea
- North Korea–Somalia relations
