= France–Somalia relations =

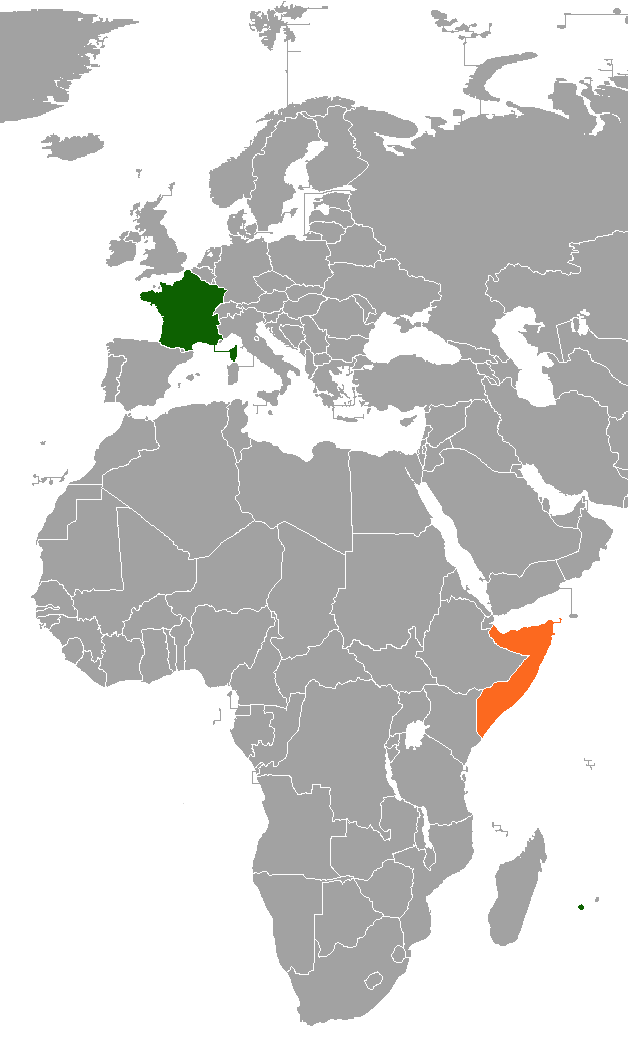
- France: Somalia

France–Somalia relations are bilateral relations between France and Somalia.

== History ==
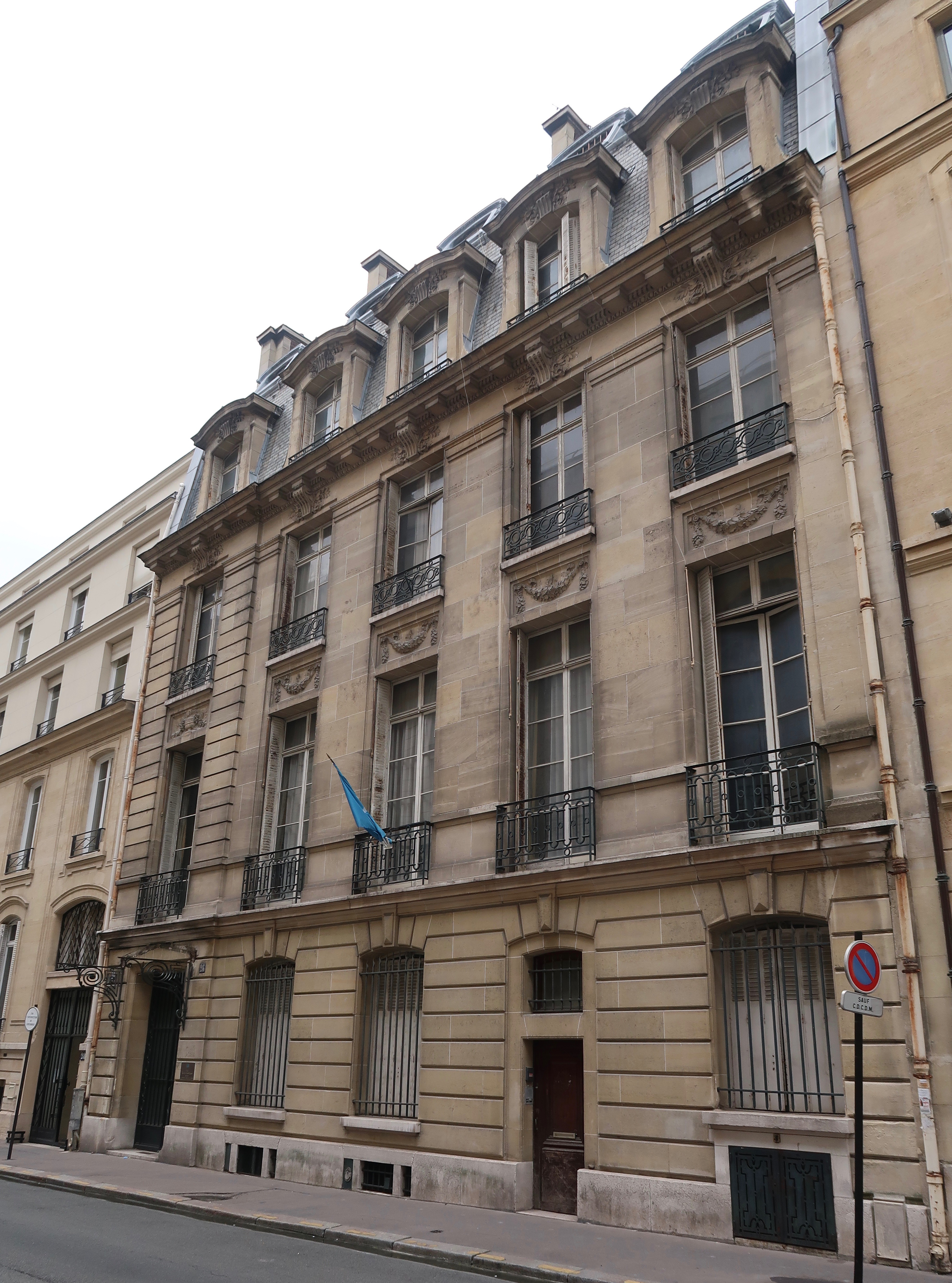
Embassy of Somalia in Paris.

Bilateral relations between France and Somalia were established shortly after Somalia's independence. The French government opened an embassy in Mogadishu, and its Somali counterpart likewise maintained an embassy in Paris. The French embassy later closed down operations in June 1993, shortly after the start of the civil war in Somalia. In the ensuing years, France maintained diplomatic relations with the Somali Transitional National Government and its successor the Transitional Federal Government. It also supported local peace initiatives by the European Union and the international community.

The subsequent establishment of the Federal Government of Somalia in August 2012 was welcomed by the French authorities, who re-affirmed France's continued support for Somalia's government, its territorial integrity and sovereignty.

The 2006 French census stated that there are 1,373 Somali-born residents living France.

== Diplomatic missions ==
Following a significantly improved security situation, the Government of France in January 2014 appointed Remi Marechaux as the new French ambassador to Somalia. The current French Ambassador to Somalia is Mr. Antoine Sivan, accredited since July 2017.

== See also ==
- Foreign relations of France
- Foreign relations of Somalia
