= Russia–Somalia relations =

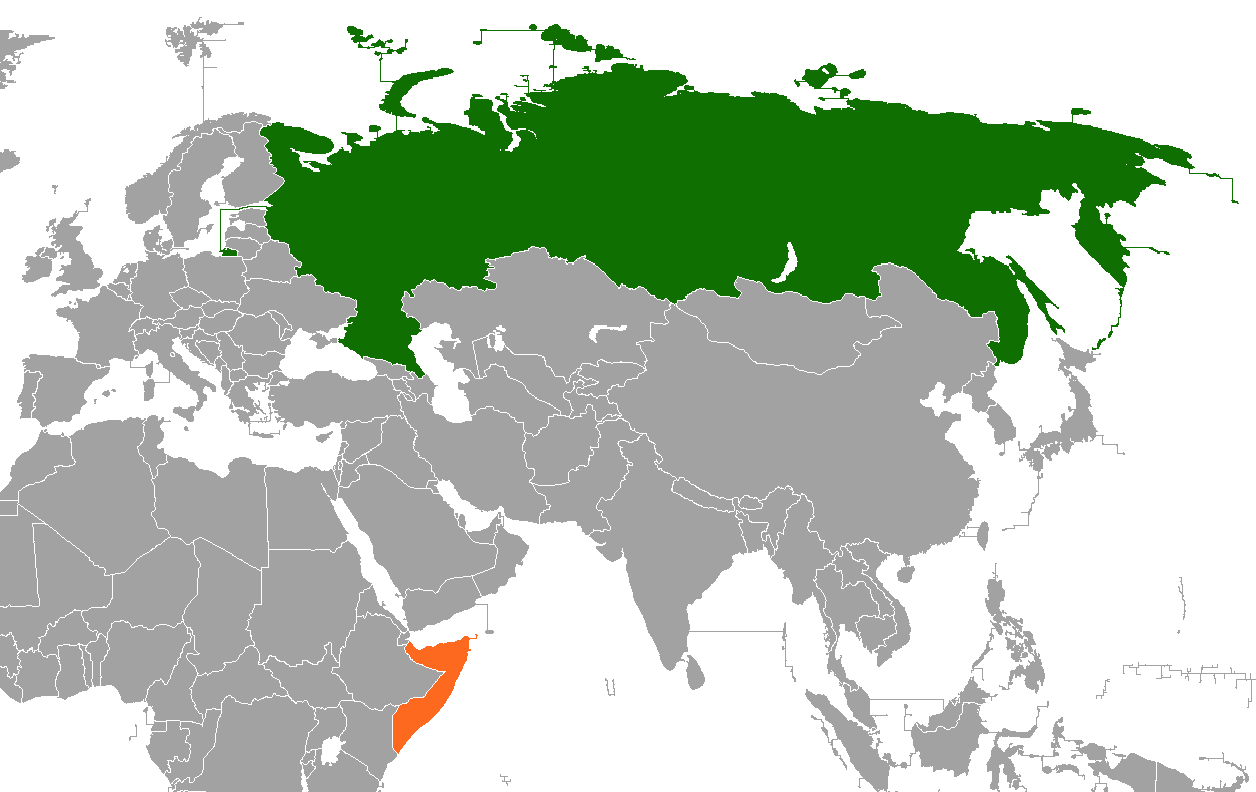
- Russia: Somalia

Russia–Somalia relations is the bilateral relationship between Russia and Somalia. A Somali Embassy currently operates in Moscow. Russia's embassy in Djibouti represents Russia in Somalia.

== History ==
=== Early relations ===
Diplomatic relations between the Soviet Union and Somalia were established on September 11, 1960. In June 1961, an agreement was signed on cultural cooperation between the countries. In 1962, the first military contacts took place, with 50 military personnel from Somalia being sent to get military education in the Soviet Union. At the same time, the USSR provided Somalia with a loan of $32 million to modernize and increase the size of the Somali National Army. The Soviets also assisted in humanitarian work, helping the Barre government address the Abaartii Dabadheer drought in the northern regions of the country (specifically in the Hobyo and Caynaba regions), airlifting around 90,000 people from the devastated regions. On July 11, 1974, the USSR and Somalia signed a Treaty of Friendship and Cooperation for a period of 20 years, gaining a naval base at Berbera that year.

=== Soviet-Somali split ===
After the beginning of the Ogaden War against Ethiopia, a Soviet ally, relations between the countries were severed. In November 1977, the President Siad Barre announced the termination of the 1974 Soviet-Somali Friendship Treaty. Barre subsequently expelled all Soviet advisers, and personally switched allegiance from the Eastern Bloc to the West, particularly the United States. The USSR also lost access to its naval base at Berbera. In 1978, Barre railed against Soviet influence in the Horn of Africa at a summit of the Organisation of African Unity.

=== Modern era ===
Currently, Russian-Somali relations are at a very high level, with Russia having sent humanitarian aid to Somalia several times. In May 2010, Somalia warned that relations with Russia may be harmed over the MV Moscow University hijacking, after which Somalia's government demanded an apology from the Russian government. On 19 April 2016, Somali Prime Minister Omar Sharmarke held a bilateral meeting with Russian Foreign Minister Sergei Lavrov, where he requested Russian assistance to strengthen the Somali Armed Forces in the fight against terrorist organization Al-Shabaab. In January 2018, Deputy Prime Minister of Russia Arkady Dvorkovich met with Hassan Ali Khaire within the framework of the Davos Economic Forum.

In 2023, Somalia was one of six African countries to be part of a free Russian grain deal. The other five countries were the Central African Republic, Burkina Faso, Eritrea, Mali, and Zimbabwe.

== Ambassadors ==
=== From Somalia to Russia ===
- Mohamed Ibrahim Liqliiqato (1969–1970)
- Mohamed Mohamoud Handule (27 July 2007 – 2015)
- Abdullahi Mohamud Warsame (since 2016)

=== From Russia to Somalia ===
- See List of ambassadors of Russia to Somalia

== See also ==
- Foreign relations of Russia
- Foreign relations of Somalia
