= Egypt–Somalia relations =

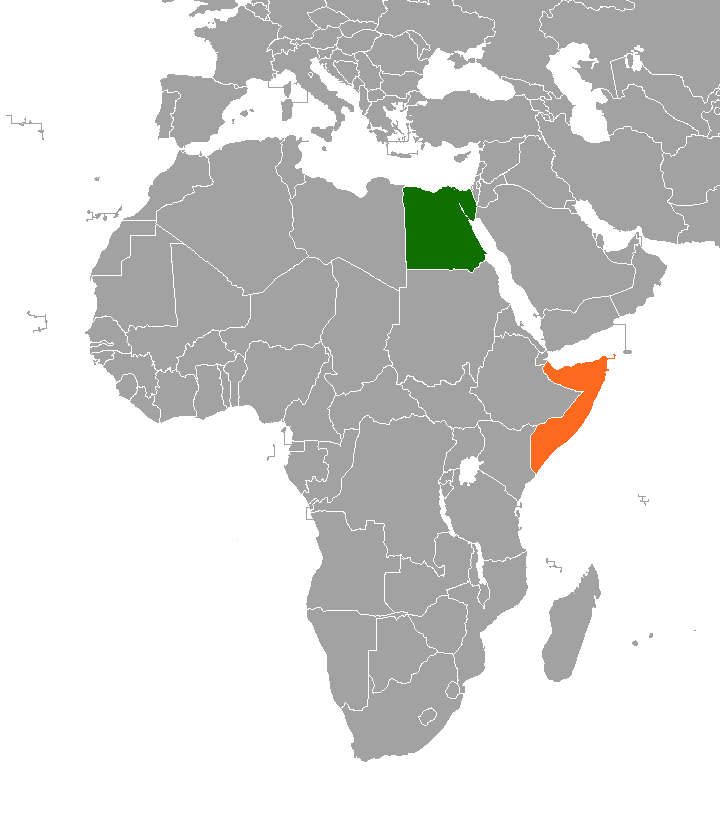
- Egypt: Somalia

Egypt–Somalia relations are bilateral relations between Egypt and Somalia. Both nations are Arab League members and engage in close development cooperation. Somalia also has an embassy in Cairo, and Egypt is slated to reopen its embassy in Mogadishu.

== Overview ==
Relations between the territories of present-day Egypt and Somalia stretch back to antiquity. An Egyptian expedition sent to the Land of Punt by the 18th dynasty Queen Hatshepsut is recorded on the temples at Deir el-Bahari, during the reign of the Puntite King Parahu and Queen Ati. According to the Roman scholar Pliny the Elder, the Egyptian Pharaoh Sesostris also led his forces past the Port of Isis en route to the northeastern market town of Mosylon, a cinnamon hub that is believed to have been in or close to present-day Bosaso.

According to Herodotus' account, the Persian Emperor Cambyses II upon his conquest of Egypt (525 BC) sent ambassadors to Macrobia, bringing luxury gifts for the Macrobian king to entice his submission. The Macrobian ruler, who was elected based at least in part on stature, replied instead with a challenge for his Persian counterpart in the form of an unstrung bow: if the Persians could manage to string it, they would have the right to invade his country; but until then, they should thank the gods that the Macrobians never decided to invade their empire. Like Ancient Egypt Herodotus detailed how the Macrobians practiced an elaborate form of embalming.

The 1st century CE Greco-Roman travelogue the Periplus of the Erythraean Sea, among other documents, reports later commercial exchanges between traders inhabiting city-states on the northern Somali littoral with Ptolemaic Egypt. During the Middle Ages and early modern period, the various Somali Sultanates also maintained close relations with their counterparts in Egypt. The Moroccan traveler Ibn Battuta reported that the Sultanate of Mogadishu exported its own trademark cloth to trading partners in the Nile Valley. Archaeological excavations at former Adal Sultanate sites in northwestern Somalia likewise yielded coins that had been minted by Sultans Barquq (1382–99) and Qaitbay (1468-89) of the Egyptian Burji Mamluk Sultanate.

During the ensuing colonial period, Egypt and Somalia maintained close ties through the UN delegate to Somalia Kamal El Din Salah, who supported the territorial integrity of the Somali territories. Upon independence of the Somali Republic in 1960, Egypt was among the first nations to recognize the nascent country. It subsequently invested heavily in the education sector, with Cairo's Al-Azhar University leading scholastic and Muslim missions in Mogadishu, among other areas. During the early 1960s, Egypt was one of the primary sources of foreign military assistance for the Somali National Army. In 1969, Egypt and Somalia were among the founding members of the Organisation of Islamic Cooperation (OIC). Both nations are also members of the League of Arab States.

After the start of the civil war in Somalia in 1991, Egypt maintained diplomatic relations with the Transitional National Government and its successor the Transitional Federal Government, and supported their state-building initiatives. As part of the International Contact Group, the Egyptian authorities participated in various global summits in support of the Somali peace process, including the Khartoum Conference in 2006, the Djibouti Conference in 2008, and the Cairo Conference in 2010.

The subsequent establishment of the Federal Government of Somalia in August 2012 was welcomed by the Egyptian authorities, who re-affirmed Egypt's continued support for Somalia's government, its territorial integrity and sovereignty.

== Development cooperation ==
The governments of Egypt and Somalia engage in close development cooperation. Much of this work is channeled through the Arab League and the Egyptian Fund for Technical Cooperation with Africa. In conjunction with the Somali Institute for Diplomatic Studies, the Egyptian authorities also organized diplomatic training for Somali government officials in 2010.

In June 2013, Egyptian Ministry of Defence officials arrived in Mogadishu to help reconstruct the national Ministry of Defence's offices. According to the Somali Navy commander Admiral Farah Qare, the Egyptian delegation comprised engineers, who were tasked with building new headquarters for the Somali ministry.

In October 2014, Foreign Minister of Somalia Abdirahman Duale Beyle met with Egypt's Charge D'affaires in Somalia Mohamed Mandour at his office in Mogadishu. The two officials discussed various issues of mutual interest, including supporting the Federal Government of Somalia's post-conflict reconstruction initiatives and fully re-establishing bilateral ties between both countries. According to Beyle, Egypt is a longstanding ally and current partner of the Somali government.

In November 2014, Beyle and President of Somalia Hassan Sheikh Mohamud met in Mogadishu with Egypt's new Ambassador to Somalia, Walid Ismail. The officials subsequently held a closed door meeting in which they discussed various ways to strengthen the historic bilateral ties between the two nations. According to Beyle, Ismail also indicated that his administration would double its development assistance to Somalia in the education sector.

In August 2024, Egypt and Somalia signed a defense pact to bolster military cooperation between the two countries, the details of which are still unclear. Egypt also offered to support a new African peace keeping mission in Somalia to replace the current one, as Somalia has asked for the withdrawal of Ethiopian Forces.

On January 23, 2025, Egypt and Somalia concluded a strategic partnership agreement at the political, economic, and military levels.

In early 2026, Egypt deployed military personnel and equipment to Somalia as part of its contribution to the African Union Support and Stabilization Mission in Somalia (AUSSOM), expanding on bilateral defence cooperation agreed in previous years. Somali President Hassan Sheikh Mohamud and Egypt’s military leadership attended a formal formation of Egyptian forces assigned to the mission, during which participating troops and their equipment were presented and briefed on operational readiness.

The deployment, approved by the African Union Peace and Security Council and coordinated with Somali authorities, is intended to support Somali security efforts and contribute to stability under the AU mandate to counter insurgent groups such as al‑Shabaab and reinforce national defence capacities.

This action followed earlier agreements on military cooperation, including a military cooperation protocol signed in August 2024 and subsequent preparations throughout 2025, and reflects a deepening of security ties between Cairo and Mogadishu with engagement framed within international peace and stability efforts in the Horn of Africa.

== Diplomatic missions ==
The Federal Government of Somalia maintains an embassy in Cairo. The diplomatic mission was led by Ambassador Abdallah Hassan Mahmoud since 21 November 2015.

The Egyptian government has announced that it is slated to reopen its embassy in Mogadishu. As of November 2014, Walid Ismail serves as Egypt's Ambassador to Somalia.

On 9 June 2022, Egyptian Prime Minister Mostafa Madbouly, on behalf of President Abdel Fattah al-Sisi, attended the inauguration ceremony of new Somali President Hassan Sheikh Mohamud in Mogadishu. Madbouly gave a congratulatory speech at the ceremony, celebrating the "historical and strategic ties between the two African countries," and reiterating support to Somalia's effort to promote peace and security, achieve sustainable development, and eradicate terrorism. Madbouly also mentioned new potential aid that could be provided to the nation, and aspiration to enhance joint cooperation with the Somali government under the new leadership, inviting Mohamud to "visit Egypt".

== See also ==
- Foreign relations of Egypt
- Foreign relations of Somalia
