= List of diplomatic missions of Somalia =

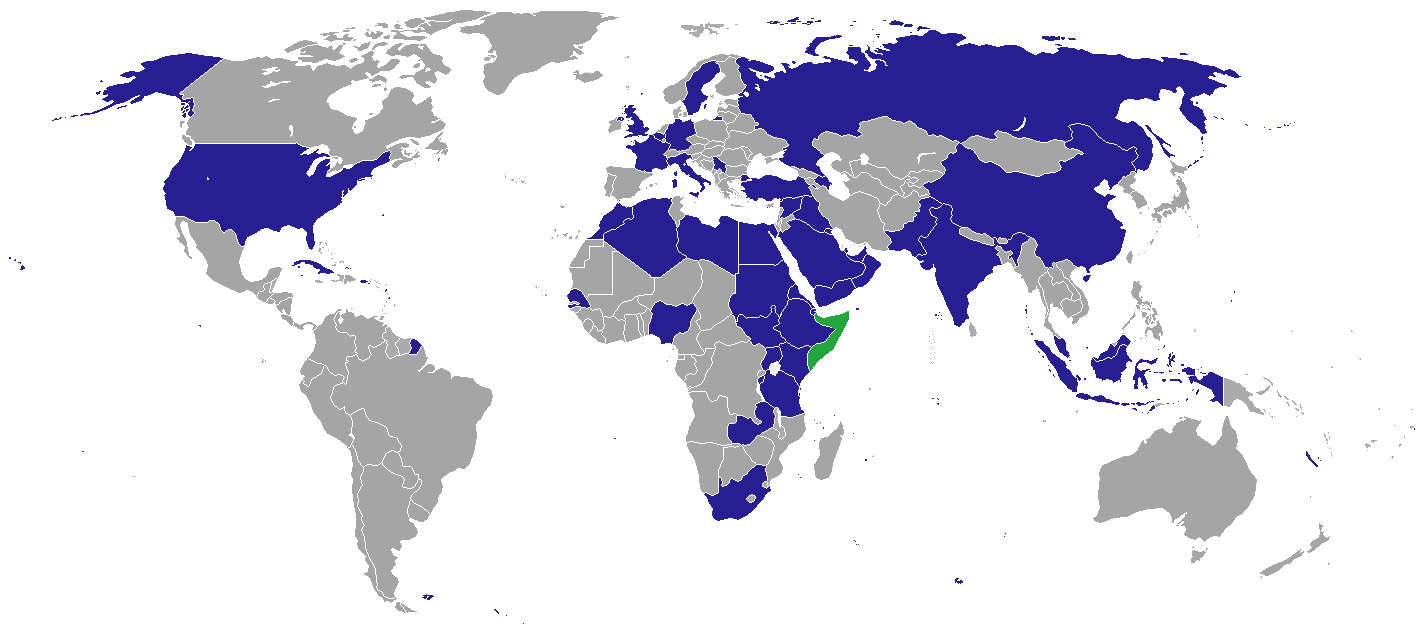
Diplomatic missions of Somalia.

This is a list of diplomatic missions of Somalia.

Honorary consulates and trade missions are excluded from this listing. Also excluded are the missions of Somaliland, a self-declared sovereign state that is internationally recognized as an autonomous region of Somalia.

== Current missions ==
=== Africa ===
Host country	Host city	Mission	Concurrent accreditation	Ref.
Algeria	Algiers	Embassy	Countries: Mauritania; Tunisia	
Burundi	Bujumbura	Embassy		
Djibouti	Djibouti City	Embassy	Multilateral Organizations: Intergovernmental Authority on Development	
Egypt	Cairo	Embassy	Multilateral Organizations: Arab League	
Eritrea	Asmara	Embassy		
Ethiopia	Addis Ababa	Embassy	Multilateral Organizations: African Union; United Nations Economic Commission for Africa	
Kenya	Nairobi	Embassy	Multilateral Organizations: United Nations; United Nations Environment Programme; United Nations Human Settlements Programme	
Libya	Tripoli	Embassy		
Morocco	Rabat	Embassy		
Nigeria	Abuja	Embassy	Multilateral Organizations: Economic Community of West African States	
Senegal	Dakar	Embassy	Countries: Gambia; Ivory Coast	
South Africa	Pretoria	Embassy	Countries: Angola; Botswana; Eswatini; Lesotho; Mozambique; Namibia; Zimbabwe	
South Sudan	Juba	Embassy	Countries: Chad; Niger	
Sudan	Khartoum	Embassy		
Tanzania	Dar Es Salaam	Embassy	Countries: Comoros; Congo-Kinshasa; Malawi; Mauritius; Rwanda; Multilateral Organizations: East African Community	
Uganda	Kampala	Embassy		
Zambia	Lusaka	Embassy		

=== Americas ===
Host country	Host city	Mission	Concurrent accreditation	Ref.
Cuba	Havana	Embassy	Countries: Brazil	
United States	Washington, D.C.	Embassy	Countries: Canada	

=== Asia ===
Host country	Host city	Mission	Concurrent accreditation	Ref.
Azerbaijan	Baku	Embassy		
China	Beijing	Embassy	Countries: Mongolia; Thailand; Vietnam	
India	New Delhi	Embassy	Countries: Maldives; Nepal; Sri Lanka	
Indonesia	Jakarta	Embassy	Countries: Australia; Brunei; Singapore; South Korea; Multilateral Organizations: Association of Southeast Asian Nations	
Iraq	Baghdad	Embassy		
Kuwait	Kuwait City	Embassy		
Malaysia	Kuala Lumpur	Embassy	Countries: Philippines	
Oman	Muscat	Embassy		
Pakistan	Islamabad	Embassy	Countries: Bangladesh	
Qatar	Doha	Embassy		
Saudi Arabia	Riyadh	Embassy	Countries: Bahrain; Jordan	
Saudi Arabia	Jeddah	Consulate-General	Countries: Bahrain; Jordan	
Syria	Damascus	Embassy	Countries: Lebanon	
Turkey	Ankara	Embassy	Countries: Georgia; Kazakhstan; Kyrgyzstan; Tajikistan; Turkmenistan; Uzbekistan	
United Arab Emirates	Abu Dhabi	Embassy		
United Arab Emirates	Dubai	Consulate-General		
Yemen	Aden	Consulate-General		

=== Europe ===
Host country	Host city	Mission	Concurrent accreditation	Ref.
Belgium	Brussels	Embassy	Countries: Ireland; Luxembourg; Malta; Netherlands; Romania; Multilateral Organizations: European Union; Organisation for the Prohibition of Chemical Weapons	
France	Paris	Embassy	Multilateral Organizations: UNESCO	
Germany	Berlin	Embassy	Countries: Croatia; Czechia; Hungary; Poland	
Italy	Rome	Embassy	Multilateral Organizations: Food and Agriculture Organization	
Russia	Moscow	Embassy	Countries: Belarus; Bulgaria; Slovakia	
Serbia	Belgrade	Embassy	Countries: Ukraine	
Sweden	Stockholm	Embassy	Countries: Denmark; Finland; Norway	
United Kingdom	London	Embassy	Countries: Iceland	

=== Multilateral organizations ===
Organization	Host city	Host country	Mission	Concurrent accreditation	Ref.
United Nations	New York City	United States	Permanent Mission		
United Nations	Geneva	Switzerland	Permanent Mission	Countries: Austria; Switzerland	

== Gallery ==
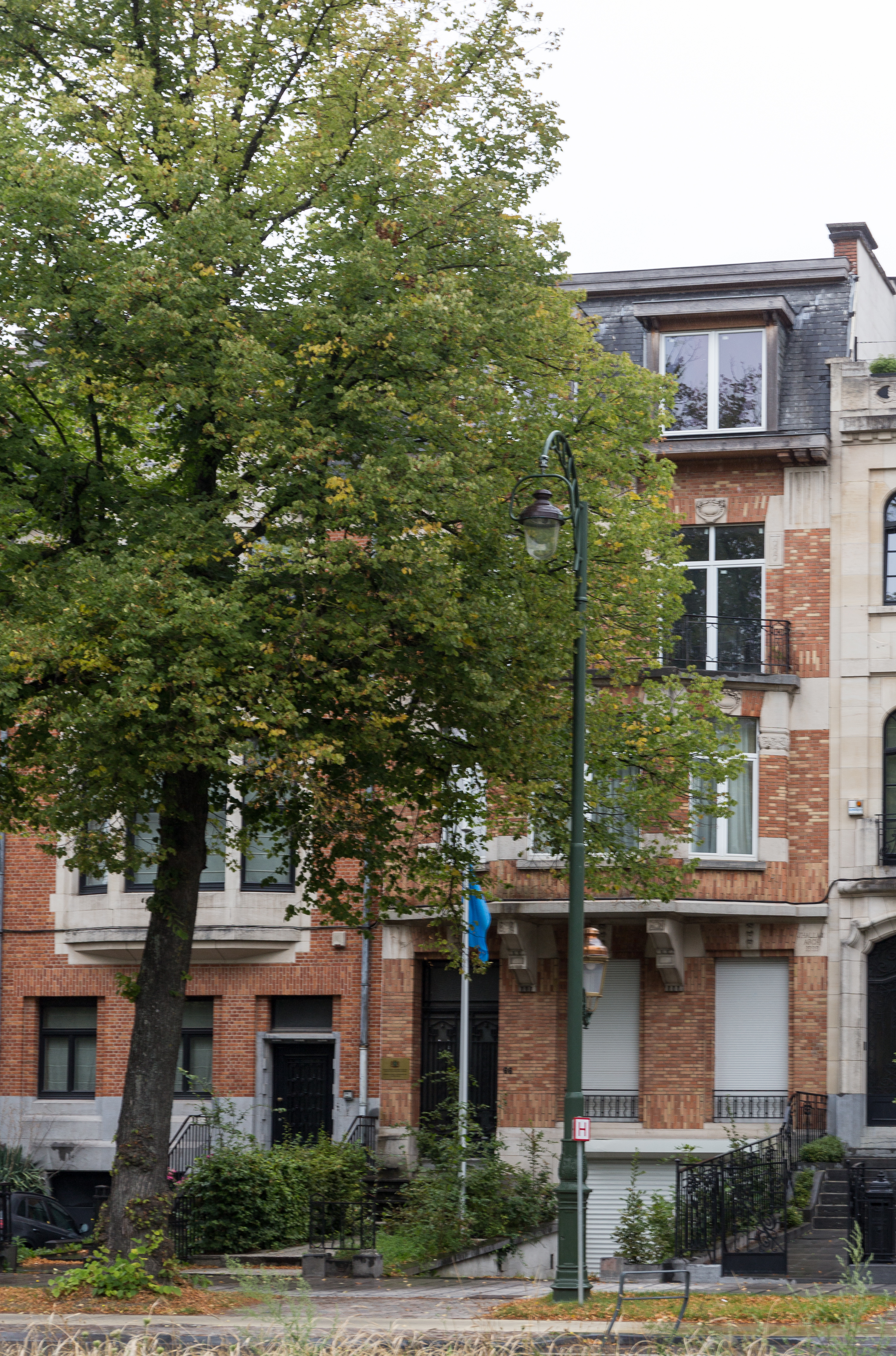
Embassy in Brussels

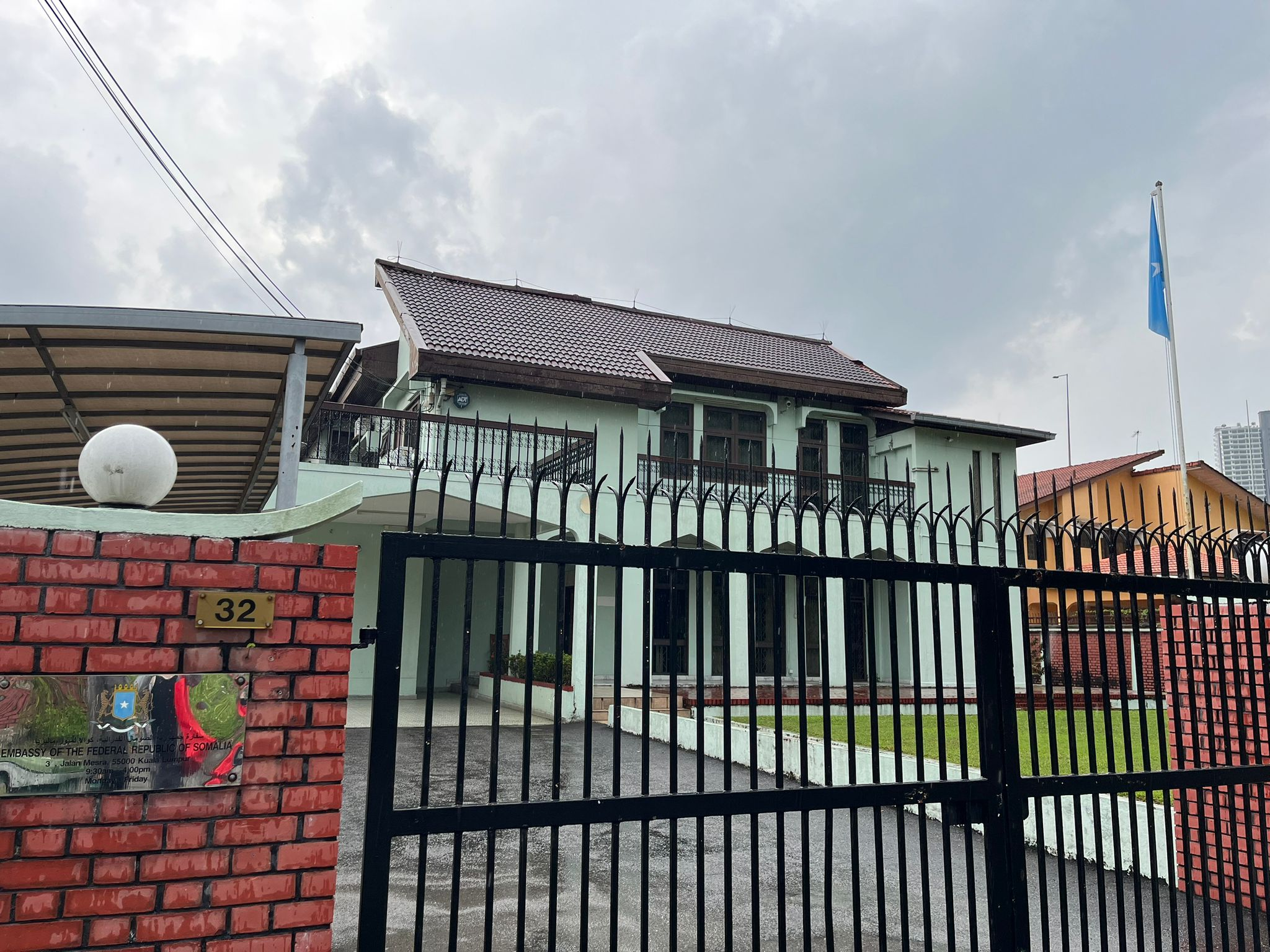
Embassy in Kuala Lumpur

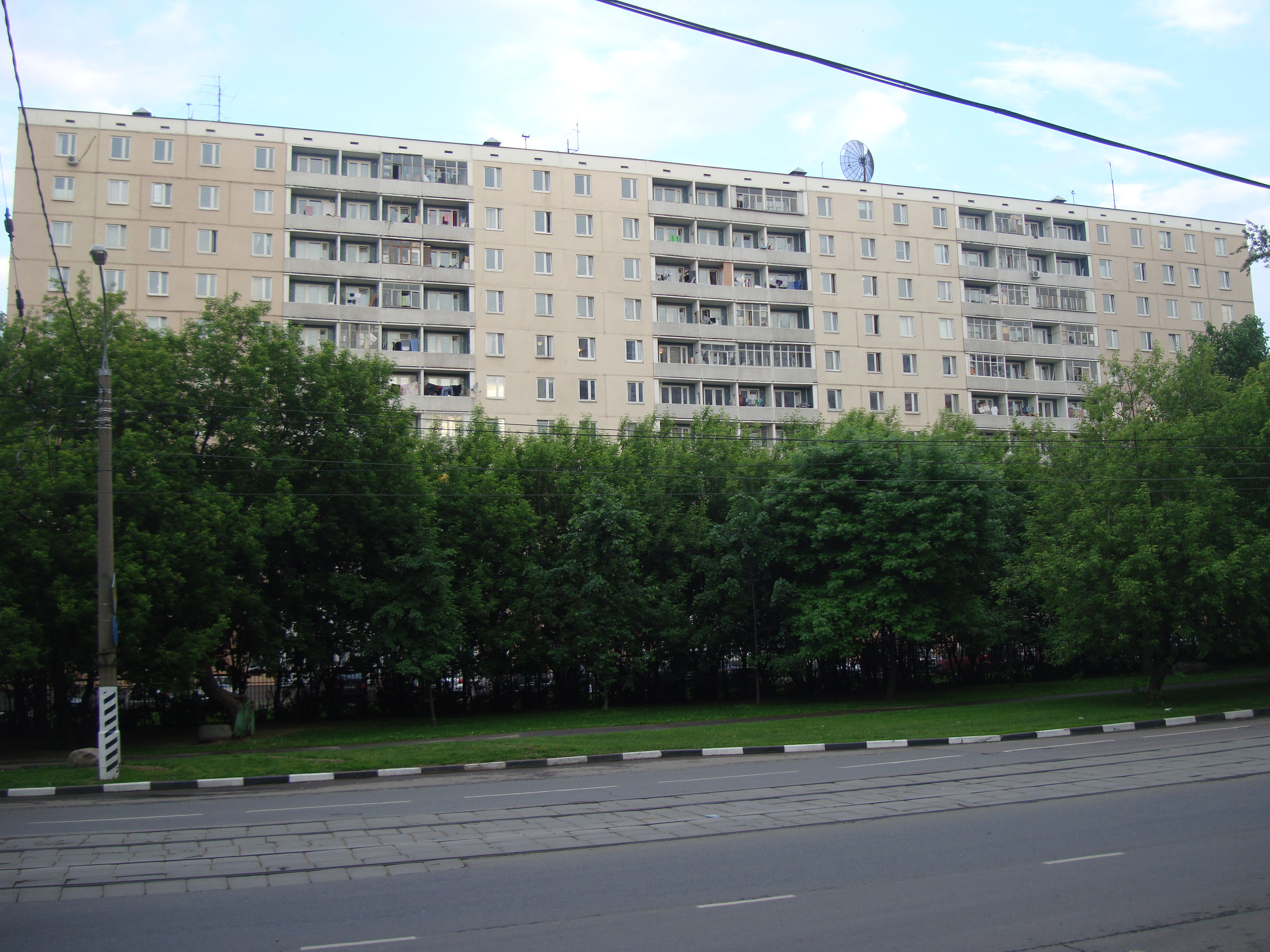
Embassy in Moscow

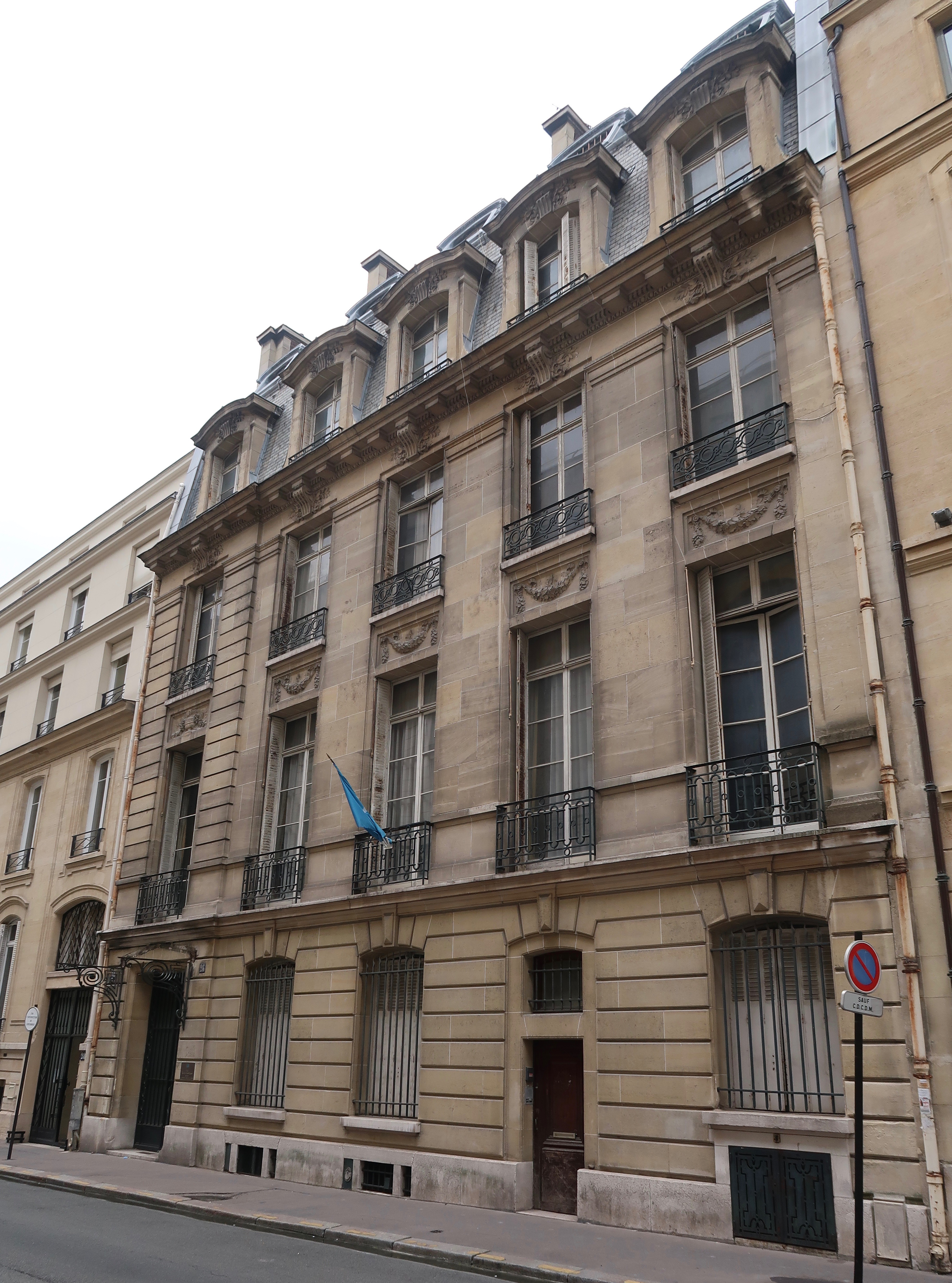
Embassy in Paris

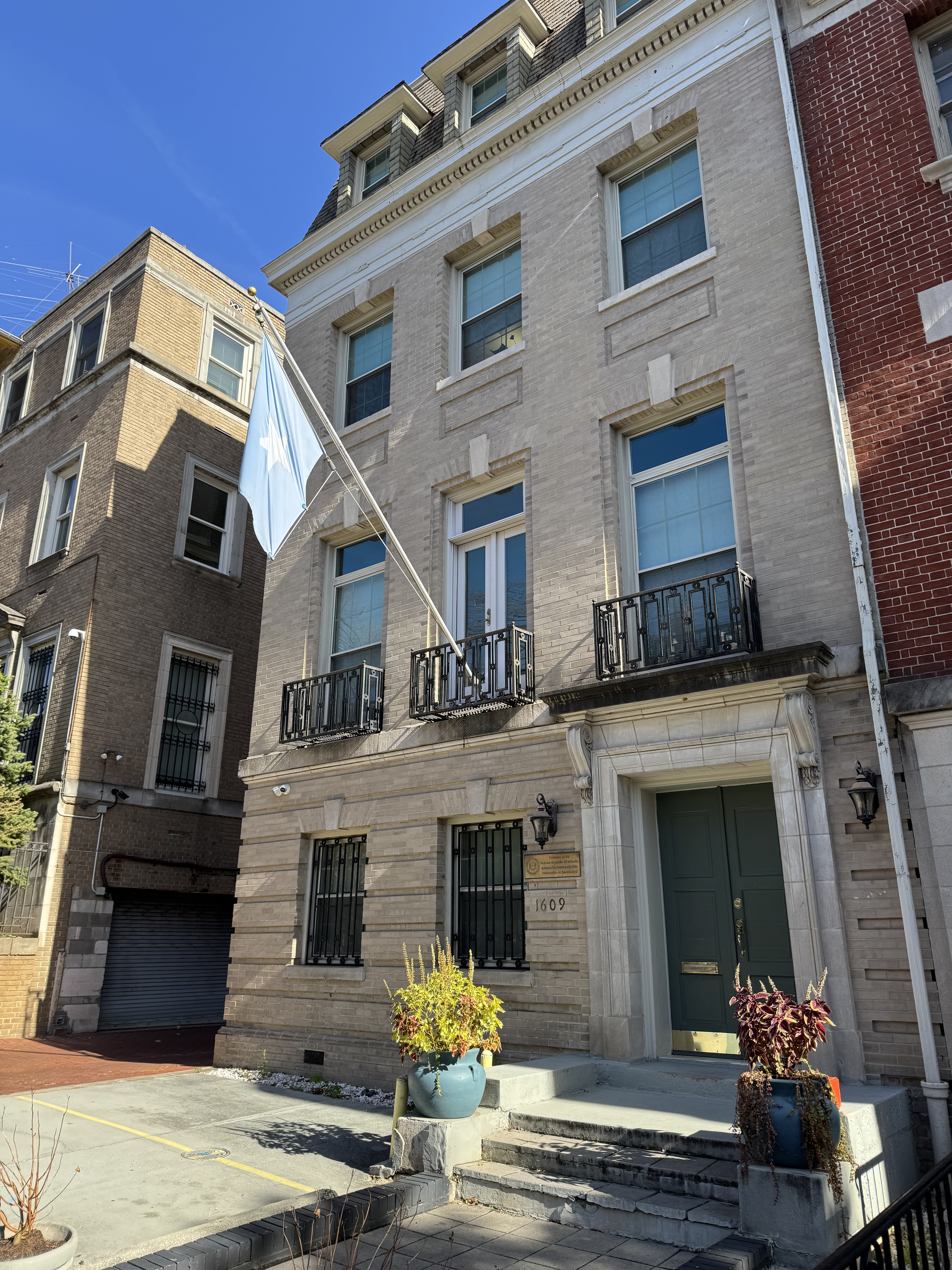
Embassy in Washington, D.C.

== Closed missions ==
=== Africa ===
Host country	Host city	Mission	Year closed	Ref.
Mozambique	Maputo	Embassy (Note: Resident in Pretoria, South Africa)	Unknown	
Tunisia	Tunis	Embassy	Unknown	

=== Asia ===
Host country	Host city	Mission	Year closed	Ref.
Iran	Tehran	Embassy	Unknown	
Japan	Tokyo	Embassy	1990	
South Yemen	Aden	Embassy	Unknown	
Yemen	Sana'a	Embassy	2016	

=== Europe ===
Host country	Host city	Mission	Year closed	Ref.
East Germany	East Berlin	Embassy (Note: Continues as an embassy in Berlin, Germany.)	Unknown	
Germany	Bonn	Embassy (Note: Continues as an embassy in Berlin, Germany.)	2000	
Romania	Bucharest	Embassy (Note: Resident in Moscow, Russia)	1991	

=== North America ===
Host country	Host city	Mission	Year closed	Ref.
Canada	Ottawa	Embassy	2024	

== See also ==
- Foreign relations of Somalia
- List of diplomatic missions in Somalia
- Visa policy of Somalia
- Visa requirements for Somali citizens
