= Foreign relations of Somalia =

Foreign relations of Somalia are handled primarily by the President as the head of state, the Prime Minister as the head of government, and the Minister of Foreign Affairs of the Federal Government.

According to Article 54 of the national constitution, the allocation of powers and resources between the Federal Government and the Federal Republic of Somalia's constituent Federal Member States shall be negotiated and agreed upon by the Federal Government and the Federal Member States, except in matters pertaining to foreign affairs, national defense, citizenship and immigration, and monetary policy. Article 53 also stipulates that the Federal Government shall consult the Federal Member States on major issues related to international agreements, including negotiations vis-a-vis foreign trade, finance and treaties.

Somaliland is an unrecognised de facto sovereign state that maintains consulate-level informal relations with some foreign governments.

== Diplomatic relations ==
List of countries which Somalia maintains diplomatic relations with:

#	Country	Date
1	Uganda	1 April 1960
2	France	1 July 1960
3	Germany	1 July 1960
4	Italy	1 July 1960
5	United States	1 July 1960
6	Russia	4 July 1960
7	Belgium	5 July 1960
8	Switzerland	5 July 1960
9	United Kingdom	7 July 1960
10	Netherlands	7 July 1960
11	Egypt	8 July 1960
12	Denmark	9 July 1960
13	Sweden	13 July 1960
14	Serbia	8 September 1960
15	Czech Republic	26 September 1960
16	Bulgaria	28 September 1960
17	Albania	September 1960
18	Hungary	14 October 1960
19	Ethiopia	14 December 1960
20	China	14 December 1960
21	Malaysia	17 December 1960
22	Saudi Arabia	17 December 1960
23	Pakistan	18 December 1960
24	Yemen	18 December 1960
25	Indonesia	21 December 1960
26	Ghana	25 February 1961
27	India	10 March 1961
28	Lebanon	6 October 1961
29	Sudan	6 October 1961
—	Sovereign Military Order of Malta	28 November 1961
30	Japan	6 December 1961
31	Austria	19 June 1962
32	Poland	11 July 1962
33	Tanzania	16 October 1963
34	Kuwait	29 July 1964
35	Syria	14 December 1964
36	Romania	10 July 1965
37	Turkey	13 December 1965
38	Iraq	17 October 1966
39	Jordan	1 January 1967
40	North Korea	13 April 1967
41	Kenya	17 December 1967
42	Libya	30 December 1967
43	Canada	6 March 1968
44	Spain	27 June 1968
45	Zambia	7 July 1968
46	Tunisia	July 1969
47	Nigeria	27 February 1970
48	Vietnam	7 June 1970
49	Cyprus	1970
50	Mongolia	28 February 1971
51	Finland	12 March 1971
52	Norway	30 March 1971
53	Cuba	19 July 1972
54	Bahrain	29 October 1972
55	United Arab Emirates	29 November 1972
—	Iran (suspended)	1972
56	Democratic Republic of the Congo	28 January 1973
57	Cambodia	16 August 1973
58	Greece	15 December 1973
59	Qatar	3 February 1974
60	Argentina	15 March 1974
61	Algeria	17 March 1974
62	Mozambique	25 June 1975
63	Mexico	5 August 1975
64	Senegal	2 October 1975
65	Togo	21 November 1975
66	Philippines	21 April 1977
67	Morocco	24 January 1979
68	Djibouti	4 June 1979
69	Laos	27 February 1980
70	Liberia	1980
71	Oman	1980
72	Sri Lanka	4 January 1982
73	Portugal	1 February 1982
74	Benin	12 March 1982
75	Singapore	14 January 1983
76	Nepal	24 October 1984
77	Thailand	1 November 1984
78	Iceland	20 March 1985
79	Seychelles	14 April 1986
80	Brazil	2 April 1987
81	South Korea	25 September 1987
82	Maldives	10 March 1988
83	Colombia	3 October 1988
84	Zimbabwe	5 December 1989
85	Bangladesh	30 December 1989
86	Botswana	15 March 1990
87	Armenia	28 June 2001
88	Eritrea	12 February 2002
89	Belarus	3 October 2003
90	Azerbaijan	22 March 2004
91	Tajikistan	28 July 2004
92	North Macedonia	17 February 2005
93	Venezuela	2 May 2005
94	Australia	20 April 2010
95	Georgia	26 January 2011
96	Estonia	23 May 2011
97	South Africa	13 March 2012
98	South Sudan	19 May 2012
99	Rwanda	18 October 2012
100	Slovakia	23 May 2013
101	Luxembourg	27 September 2013
102	Slovenia	3 April 2014
103	Fiji	10 April 2014
104	Burundi	14 April 2014
105	Malta	11 June 2014
106	Latvia	26 September 2014
—	Kosovo	28 May 2015
107	Ireland	1 August 2017
108	Lithuania	30 September 2017
109	Mauritania	27 March 2018
110	Turkmenistan	4 November 2019
111	Angola	31 August 2021
112	Bosnia and Herzegovina	4 February 2022
113	Croatia	4 February 2022
114	Gambia	22 June 2022
115	Nicaragua	27 September 2024
116	Panama	20 January 2025
117	Namibia	29 January 2025
118	Uzbekistan	5 February 2025
119	Kyrgyzstan	8 April 2025
120	Ukraine	11 April 2025
121	Malawi	3 July 2025
122	Comoros	8 July 2025
123	Ivory Coast	5 August 2025
124	Kazakhstan	27 August 2025
125	Myanmar	9 January 2026
126	Niger	15 January 2026
127	Burkina Faso	25 June 2026
128	Mali	19 August 2026
129	Dominican Republic	23 September 2026
130	Equatorial Guinea	8 October 2026
131	Chad	14 October 2026
132	Guinea	Unknown
—	State of Palestine	Unknown

== Bilateral relations ==
=== Africa ===
Country	Formal Relations Began	Notes
Djibouti		See Djibouti–Somalia relations As the headquarters of the Intergovernmental Authority on Development regional body, Djibouti has been an active participant in the Somali peace process. It hosted the Arta conference in 2000, as well as the 2008-2009 talks between the Transitional Federal Government and the Alliance for the Reliberation of Somalia, which led to the formation of a coalition government. In 2011, Djibouti joined the African Union Mission to Somalia. Following the establishment of the Federal Government of Somalia in 2012, a Djibouti delegation also attended the inauguration ceremony of Somalia's new president.
Egypt		See Egypt–Somalia relations Relations between the territories of present-day Egypt and Somalia stretch back to antiquity. In the Middle Ages and early modern era, the various Somali Sultanates also maintained close relations with their counterparts in Egypt. During the ensuing colonial period, Egypt and Somalia kept close ties through the UN delegate to Somalia Kamal El Din Salah, who supported the territorial integrity of the Somali territories. Upon independence of the Somali Republic in 1960, Egypt was among the first nations to recognize the nascent country. It subsequently invested heavily in the education sector, with Cairo's Al-Azhar University leading scholastic and Muslim missions in Mogadishu, among other areas. In 1969, Somalia and Egypt were among the founding members of the Organisation of Islamic Cooperation (OIC). Both nations are also members of the League of Arab States. After the start of the civil war in Somalia in 1991, Egypt maintained diplomatic relations with the Transitional National Government and its successor the Transitional Federal Government, and supported their state-building initiatives. As part of the International Contact Group, the Egyptian authorities participated in various global summits in support of the Somali peace process, including the Khartoum Conference in 2006, the Djibouti Conference in 2008, and the Cairo Conference in 2010. It also organized diplomatic training for Somali government officials in conjunction with the Somali Institute for Diplomatic Studies. The subsequent establishment of the Federal Government of Somalia in August 2012 was welcomed by the Egyptian authorities, who re-affirmed Egypt's continued support for Somalia's government, its territorial integrity and sovereignty.
Ethiopia		See Ethiopia–Somalia relations Relations between the peoples of Somalia and Ethiopia stretch back to antiquity, to a common origin. The Ethiopian region is one of the proposed homelands of the Horn of Africa's various Afro-Asiatic communities. During the Middle Ages, Somali Imam Ahmad ibn Ibrihim al-Ghazi (Ahmad Gurey or Gragn) led a Conquest of Abyssinia (Futuh al-Habash), which brought three-quarters of the Christian Ethiopian Empire under the power of the Muslim Adal Sultanate. With an army mainly composed of Somalis, Many historians trace the origins of tensions between Somalia and Ethiopia to this war. In the 1960s and 1970s, a territorial dispute over the Ogaden region led to various armed confrontations between the Somali and Ethiopian militaries. The tensions culminated in the Ogaden War, which saw the Somali army capture most of the disputed territory by September 1977, before finally being expelled by a coalition of communist forces. With changes in leadership in the early 1990s brought on by the start of the Somali Civil War and Ethiopian Civil War, respectively, relations between the Somali and Ethiopian authorities entered a new phase of military cooperation against the Islamic Courts Union (ICU) rebel group and its more radical successor Al-Shabaab. In October 2011, a coordinated multinational operation began against Al-Shabaab in southern Somalia; the Ethiopian military eventually joined the Transitional Federal Government-led mission the following month. The Federal Government of Somalia was later established on August 20, 2012, representing the first permanent central government in the country since the start of the civil war. The following month, Hassan Sheikh Mohamud was elected as the new Somali government's first President, with the Ethiopian authorities welcoming his selection and newly appointed Prime Minister of Ethiopia Hailemariam Desalegn attending Mohamud's inauguration ceremony.
Kenya		See Kenya–Somalia relations Relations between Kenya and Somalia have historically been tense. Agitations over self-determination in the Somali-inhabited Northern Frontier District culminated in the Shifta War during the 1960s. Although the conflict ended in a cease-fire, Somalis in the region still identify and maintain close ties with their kin in Somalia. In October 2011, a coordinated operation between the Somali military and the Kenyan military began against the Al-Shabaab group of insurgents in southern Somalia. The mission was officially led by the Somali army, with the Kenyan forces providing a support role. In early June 2012, Kenyan troops were formally integrated into AMISOM.

=== Asia ===
Country	Formal Relations Began	Notes
China		See China–Somalia relations Relations between the territories of present-day Somalia and China date back to antiquity, when communities in both regions engaged in commercial exchanges. On 14 December 1960, formal ties between the Somali and Chinese governments were established. Somalia and China later signed their first official trade agreement in June 1963. During the Cold War period, the Somali government maintained active relations with its Chinese counterpart. The Somali authorities campaigned for an end to China's diplomatic isolation and supported instead its entry into the United Nations. In January 1991, the Chinese embassy in Mogadishu closed down operations due to the start of the civil war in Somalia. Despite the departure of most Chinese officials, the two countries maintained a small trading relationship in the ensuing years. Total trade volume in 2002 was US$3.39 million, with Somalia exporting US$1.56 million of goods to China and importing $1.83 million. From 2000 to 2011, approximately seven Chinese development projects were launched in Somalia. These initiatives included $6 million in economic assistance, donation of anti-malaria drugs, and $3 million in debt relief. In July 2007, the Chinese state-owned oil company CNOOC also signed an oil exploration agreement with the Somali government over the north-central Mudug province, situated in the autonomous Puntland region. Following the establishment of the Federal Government of Somalia in mid-2012, the Chinese authorities reaffirmed their support for the Somali government and called on the international community to strengthen its commitment to the Somali peace process. China's Permanent Representative to the UN, Li Baodong, also emphasized his administration's support for the Somali federal government's stabilization plan, including the latter's efforts at "implementing an interim Constitution, carrying out its six-point plan, strengthening institutional capacity, exercising government functions and extending effective authority over all its national territory." In August 2013, follow a meeting with Chinese Vice Premier Wang Yang, Somalia's Foreign Minister Fowziya Yusuf Haji Adan announced that the Somali authorities looked forward to cooperation with the Chinese government in the energy, infrastructure, national security and agriculture sectors, among others. Wang also praised the traditional friendship between both nations and re-affirmed China's commitment to the Somali peace process. In September 2013, both governments signed an official cooperation agreement in Mogadishu as part of a five-year national recovery plan in Somalia. The pact will see the Chinese authorities reconstruct several major infrastructural landmarks in the Somali capital and elsewhere, including the National Theatre, a hospital, and the Mogadishu Stadium, as well as the road between Galkayo and Burao in northern Somalia. In October 2014, the Chinese government also officially re-opened its embassy in Mogadishu. In December 2014, Wei Hongtian presented his credentials to President Hassan Sheikh Mohamud as the newly appointed Chinese Ambassador to Somalia. He is the first such envoy after the reopening of the Chinese embassy in Mogadishu. Foreign Minister of Somalia Abdirahman Duale Beyle and Ambassador Wei subsequently held a joint press conference, wherein the officials pledged to further strengthen bilateral ties. As part of the local reconstruction process, Wei also indicated that the Chinese authorities were slated to implement various development projects in Somalia.
Japan		See Japan–Somalia relations Prior to 1991 and the start of the civil war, the Somali authorities maintained bilateral relations with the government of Japan. The Japanese administration subsequently pledged development funds through various international organizations. With the formation of the Federal Government of Somalia in 2012, the Japanese government re-established formal diplomatic ties with the Somali authorities. In 2013, Japanese Prime Minister Shinzō Abe also announced that Japan would resume direct assistance to Somalia, particularly in the areas of security, industrial development, and bilateral trade and investment. In January 2014, Japan appointed Tatsushi Terada as the new Japanese Ambassador to Somalia, replacing Atoshisa Takata. Ambassador Terada concurrently presented his credentials to the Somali President Hassan Sheikh Mohamud at a ceremony in Mogadishu.
North Korea	13 April 1967	See North Korea–Somalia relations Diplomatic relations between the Democratic People's Republic of Korea (commonly known as North Korea) and Somalia were formally established on 13 April 1967. This late-1950s to 1960s period was when North Korea had first declared autonomous diplomacy. During the Somali Democratic Republic, relations with North Korea were close, due to shared ideals and geopolitical interests. Both countries formally adhered to anti-imperialism and Marxism–Leninism, and were aligned with the Soviet Union in the context of the wider Cold War. The Supreme Revolutionary Council established relations with the DPRK in 1970. Over the following years, military cooperation intensified, with North Korea training and equipping the Somali Armed Forces. Additionally, due to a resentment against Ethiopia over the country's involvement in the Korean War, North Korean advisers trained pro-Somalia guerrilla forces active in the Ethiopian–Somali conflict. This changed considerably after the communist Derg came to power in 1974, causing an eventual realignment of Soviet support towards Ethiopia. North Korea followed suit, and provided military aid to Ethiopia against Somalia during the Ogaden War. As of March 2014, North Korea and Somalia still officially maintain diplomatic relations according to the National Committee on North Korea.
Pakistan		See Pakistan–Somalia relations Relations between the modern-day territories of Somalia and Pakistan stretch back to antiquity. In 1969, Somalia and Pakistan were among the founding members of the Organisation of Islamic Cooperation (OIC). Somalia's relations with Pakistan remained strong in the following years and through the ensuing civil period, when Pakistan contributed to the UN peacekeeping operation in southern Somalia. Following the establishment of the Federal Government of Somalia in 2012, the Pakistani authorities welcomed the new administration, and re-affirmed Pakistan's continued support for Somalia's government, its territorial integrity and sovereignty. Additionally, Somalia maintains an embassy in Islamabad.
Qatar		See Qatar–Somalia relations The State of Qatar and the Republic of Somalia maintain good relations. In March 2015, Prime Minister Omar Abdirashid Ali Sharmarke led talks with the Prime Minister of Qatar, Abdullah bin Nasser bin Khalifa Al Thani. The gathering focused on strengthening investment, commerce and governance ties between both territories, with an emphasis on stabilization initiatives. It concluded with a signed cooperative agreement in the civil aviation and education sectors. According to Sharmarke, the treaty aims to accelerate the ongoing reconstruction and development process in Somalia and to buttress local job creation. Among the agreement's stipulations, Qatar Airways is scheduled to begin making flights to the Aden Adde International Airport in Mogadishu. Somalia maintains an embassy in Qatar, with the diplomatic mission led by Ambassador Omar Idris. Qatar also has an embassy in Mogadishu, led by AmbassadorMr. Hasan Bin Hamza Asad Mohammed.
Saudi Arabia		Saudi Arabia had no diplomatic or consular representation in Somalia since Somalia's central government broke down in 1991. Diplomatic ties were not severed though, and on 18 January 2017 Saudi Arabia's first ambassador to Somalia since the 1990s, Dr Mohamed Abdi-kani Al-Khayat presented his credentials to President Hassan Sheikh Mohamud in Mogadishu. During the ceremony the Ambassador informed that Saudi Arabia would support building the Somali Army, establish a rehabilitation center for defected militias from Al-Shabaab and for refugees returning home. In recent years bilateral relations between the two countries centered around a number of issues: the position of Somali migrants in Saudi Arabia, the position of Shia Islam in Somalia, and the export of Somali livestock. In 2014 Saudi Arabia arrested some 41.000 Somali migrants and held them in detention centers in substandard conditions before deporting them to Mogadishu. Despite being one of the richest countries, Saudi Arabia left payment for assisting these deportees to the international community that had to issue emergency appeals to donors. The harsh mass expulsions led to an outcry from human rights organisations. In January 2016, Somalia received a pledge of aid for $50 million from Saudi Arabia on the very same day it announced it was cutting ties with Saudi's Shiite rival Iran, by expelling Iranian diplomats and closing an Iranian charity in Mogadishu -the Iman Khomeini Foundation- for "conducting activities beyond its mandate bent on compromising the country's national security". The Somali government denied there was a link between its decision to break ties with Iran and Saudi Arabia's financial support, while the Saudi Foreign Ministry refused to comment. In November 2021, Somalia and Saudi Arabia met in the Palace Of Nations in Geneva, Switzerland to settle on the issue of illegal fishing by Saudi Fisherman in the Gulf of Aden region. During the talks, Somali Prime Minister Mohamed Hussein Roble criticized the Saudi Government for not enforcing their maritime border laws that was previously agreed with Somalia in 1967, calling them "backstabbing and deceitful Bedouins". this caused the Saudi Government to sanction him for the entirety of the talks, and for the Parliament of Somalia to censure him for two months.
South Korea		See Somalia–South Korea relations South Korea officially recognizes and maintains diplomatic ties with the Federal Government of Somalia. In May 2013, Somali President Hassan Sheikh Mohamud accepted the credentials of the new South Korean Ambassador to Mogadishu, Kim Chan-Woo, the first diplomatic representative of an Asian Pacific country to work in Somalia in many years. Chan-Woo also announced that South Korea would re-open its embassy in the Somali capital. Additionally, the Ambassador indicated that his administration would support the Somali government's ongoing reconstruction efforts, in the process making use of South Korea's own experience in post-conflict rehabilitation and development gained from the Korean War. He also asserted that his administration would once again launch agricultural and technical projects in Somalia, as the South Korean authorities had done in the past.
Turkey		See Somalia–Turkey relations Relations date back to the Middle Ages and the ties between the Adal Sultanate and the Ottoman Empire. Prior to the breakout of the civil war in Somalia in 1991, Turkey maintained an embassy in Mogadishu. It later discontinued operations due to security reasons. In 2011, the Turkish government announced that it would reopen its embassy in Somalia. The Somali federal government also maintains an embassy in Ankara, Turkey's capital. During the drought of 2011, Turkey contributed over $201 million to the humanitarian relief efforts in the impacted parts of Somalia. Following a greatly improved security situation in Mogadishu in mid-2011, the Turkish government also re-opened its foreign embassy with the intention of more effectively assisting in the post-conflict development process. It was among the first foreign administrations to resume formal diplomatic relations with Somalia after the civil war. Additionally, Turkish Airlines became the first long-distance international commercial airline in two decades to land at Mogadishu's Aden Adde International Airport. As of March 2012, the flag carrier offers two flights a week from the Somali capital to Istanbul. In partnership with the Somali government, Turkish officials have also launched various development and infrastructure projects in Somalia. They have assisted in the building of several hospitals, and helped renovate and rehabilitate the Aden Adde International Airport and the National Assembly building, among other initiatives. In December 2024, Turkey successfully mediated a historic agreement between Somalia and Ethiopia, resolving longstanding tensions over Somaliland's sovereignty and Ethiopia's access to the Red Sea. This diplomatic achievement underscores Turkey's growing influence in the Horn of Africa, as it continues to strengthen political and economic ties with both nations.
United Arab Emirates		See Somalia–United Arab Emirates relations Minister of Foreign Affairs of Somalia Abdirahman Duale Beyle meeting with the UAE Ambassador to Somalia Mohamed Al-Osmani in Mogadishu. Relations between the territories of present-day Somalia and the United Arab Emirates stretch back to antiquity. During the Middle Ages and early modern period, the various Somali Sultanates also maintained close relations with other kingdoms across the Red Sea. In 1969, Somalia and the United Arab Emirates were among the founding members of the Organisation of Islamic Cooperation (OIC). Both nations are also members of the League of Arab States. After the start of the civil war in Somalia in 1991, the UAE maintained diplomatic relations with the Somali Transitional National Government and its successor the Transitional Federal Government, and supported their government initiatives. The UAE has also officially supported the Puntland Maritime Police Force since the military body's formation in 2010. The subsequent establishment of the Federal Government of Somalia in August 2012 was welcomed by the Emirati authorities, who re-affirmed the UAE's continued support for Somalia's government, its territorial integrity and sovereignty. In March 2014, Prime Minister of Somalia Abdiweli Sheikh Ahmed began an official three-day visit to the United Arab Emirates to discuss strengthening bilateral cooperation between the two nations. During talks with UAE Deputy Prime Minister and Minister of Presidential affairs Sheikh Mansour bin Zayed bin Sultan Al Nahyan, the Emirati authorities emphasized their commitment to the ongoing post-conflict reconstruction process in Somalia. They also pledged to assist in capacity building and the rehabilitation of government institutions.
Yemen		See Somalia–Yemen relations Although relations between the modern-day territories of Somalia and Yemen stretch back to antiquity, the two countries formally established diplomatic ties on December 18, 1960. Both nations are also members of the Arab League. Following the outbreak of the civil war in Somalia in the 1990s, the Yemeni authorities maintained relations with Somalia's newly established Transitional National Government and its successor the Transitional Federal Government. The subsequent establishment of the Federal Government of Somalia in August 2012 was also welcomed by the Yemeni authorities, who re-affirmed Yemen's continued support for Somalia's government, its territorial integrity and sovereignty. Additionally, Somalia maintains an embassy in Yemen, with the diplomatic mission led by Ambassador Ismail Qassim Naji. Yemen also has an embassy in Mogadishu.

=== Europe ===
Country	Formal Relations Began	Notes
Denmark	9 July 1960	See Denmark–Somalia relations Diplomatic relations between Somalia and Denmark were established on 9 July 1960, shortly after the Somali Republic's independence. During the Siad Barre administration, Somalia and Denmark strengthened cooperation. The Danish International Development Agency agreed to provide a $1.4 million loan toward the development of Somalia's northern fisheries industry. Additionally, the Somali and Danish foreign ministries signed a loan agreement in 1981, wherein 45 million DKK (US$8,284,410.00) was issued to Somalia to finance imports of Danish capital goods, as well as local cost expenditures and purchases of Danish capital equipment and services. In September 1992, Danish Foreign Minister Uffe Ellemann Jensen and other senior officials visited southern Somalia, one of the first foreign delegations to do so since the start of the civil war the year before. Although the Danish embassy in Mogadishu closed down operations, the Danish authorities in the ensuing years maintained relations with Somalia's newly established Transitional National Government and its successor the Transitional Federal Government. The subsequent establishment of the Federal Government of Somalia in August 2012 was welcomed by the Danish authorities, who re-affirmed Denmark's continued support for Somalia's government, its territorial integrity and sovereignty. In December 2013, the Danish government appointed Geert Aagaard Andersen as the new Danish Ambassador to Somalia, the first in twenty years. Andersen presented his credentials to Somali President Hassan Sheikh Mohamud at a ceremony in Mogadishu.
France		See France–Somalia relations Embassy of Somalia in Paris. Bilateral relations between France and Somalia were established shortly after Somalia's independence. The French government opened an embassy in Mogadishu, and its Somali counterpart likewise maintained an embassy in Paris. The French embassy later closed down operations in June 1993, shortly after the start of the civil war in Somalia. In the ensuing years, France maintained diplomatic relations with the Somali Transitional National Government and its successor the Transitional Federal Government. It also supported local peace initiatives by the European Union and international community. The subsequent establishment of the Federal Government of Somalia in August 2012 was welcomed by the French authorities, who re-affirmed France's continued support for Somalia's government, its territorial integrity and sovereignty. The French Republic is currently represented in Somalia by Ambassador Aline Kuster-Ménager, who presented her credentials to President Mohamed Abdullahi Mohamed in Octobre 2018.
Germany	1 July 1960	See Germany–Somalia relations Diplomatic relations between Somalia and Germany were established on 1 July 1960, shortly after the Somali Republic's independence. After a pause due to the Somali Civil War, relations where reestablished in 2012. Germany provides development aid to Somalia and both countries have established a security partnership.
Greece		Greece represented in Somalia via parallel accreditation of its embassy in Khartoum, Sudan.
Italy		See Italy–Somalia relations In terms of administration, Italy first gained a foothold in Somalia through the signing of various pacts and agreements in the late 19th century with the ruling Somali Majeerteen Sultanate and Sultanate of Hobyo, led by King Osman Mahamuud and Sultan Yusuf Ali Kenadid, respectively. In 1936, the acquired territory, dubbed Italian Somaliland, was integrated into Africa Orientale Italiana as part of the Italian Empire. This would last until 1941, during World War II. Italian Somaliland then came under British administration until 1949, when it became a United Nations trusteeship, the Trust Territory of Somalia, under Italian administration. On July 1, 1960, the Trust Territory of Somalia united as scheduled with the briefly extant State of Somaliland (the former British Somaliland) to form the Somali Republic. Although most Italian Somalis left the territory after independence, Somalia's relations with Italy remained strong in the following years and through the ensuing civil war period. The Federal Government of Somalia was later established on August 20, 2012. Italian Foreign Minister Giulio Terzi welcomed the new administration, and re-affirmed Italy's continued support for the Somali authorities.
Russia	11 September 1960	See Russia–Somalia relations
United Kingdom	7 July 1960	See Somalia–United Kingdom relations Prime Minister David Cameron with H.E. Mr Hassan Sheikh Mohamud, President of Somalia in Downing Street, 4 February 2013. Somaliia established diplomatic relations with the United Kingdom on 7 July 1960.: Somalia does not maintain an embassy in London.; The United Kingdom is accredited to Somalia through its embassy in Mogadishu.; The UK governed Somaliland from 1884 to 1940 and 1941–1960, Somaliland achieved full independence on 26 June 1960. The UK also administered the remaining territory of modern Somalia from 1941 to 1950, until it became an Italian Trust Territory. Both of these territories unified on the 1 July 1960 to become Somalia. Both countries share common membership of the United Nations. Bilaterally the two countries have a Development Partnership, and a Strategic Partnership. Somalia–United Kingdom relations date back to the 19th century. In 1884, Britain established the British Somaliland protectorate in present-day northern Somalia after signing successive treaties with the then ruling Somali Sultans, such as Mohamoud Ali Shire of the Warsangali Sultanate. In 1900, the emir of Darawiish monarch Diiriye Guure, namely Sayyid Mohammed Abdullah Hassan ("Mad Mullah") and their Dervish forces began a twenty-year resistance movement against British troops. This military campaign eventually came to an end in 1920, after Britain aerially bombarded the Dervish capital of Taleh. After the collapse of the Somali central government and the start of the civil war in 1991, the UK embassy in Mogadishu closed down. However, the British government never formally severed diplomatic ties with Somalia. Britain acknowledged and supported the internationally recognized Transitional Federal Government (TFG) as the country's national governing body. It also engaged Somalia's smaller regional administrations, such as Puntland and Somaliland, to ensure broad-based inclusion in the peace process. In 2012, the British authorities additionally organized the London Conference on Somalia to coordinate the international community's support for the interim Somali government. Following the establishment of the Federal Government of Somalia in mid-2012, British Prime Minister David Cameron welcomed the new administration and re-affirmed Britain's continued support for the Somali authorities. On 25 April 2013, the UK also became the first Western country to re-open its embassy in Somalia, with British First Secretary of State William Hague attending the opening ceremony. Harriet Mathews was appointed British Ambassador to Somalia in 2015, and as of January 2017 has since been replaced by David Concar.

=== North America ===
Country	Formal Relations Began	Notes
Canada		Canada is accredited to Somalia from its high commission in Nairobi, Kenya.; Somalia has a resident embassy in Ottawa.
Mexico	5 August 1975	Mexico is accredited to Somalia from its embassy in Addis Ababa, Ethiopia.; Somalia does not have an accreditation to Mexico.
United States		See Somalia–United States relations After the collapse of the Barre government and the start of the civil war in the early 1990s, the U.S. embassy in Mogadishu closed down. However, the American government never formally severed diplomatic ties with Somalia. The U.S. acknowledged and supported the internationally recognized, UN-backed Transitional Federal Government as the country's national governing body. It also engages Somalia's smaller regional administrations, such as Puntland and Somaliland, to ensure broad-based inclusion in the peace process. President of Somalia Hassan Sheikh Mohamud with U.S. Secretary of State John Kerry at the State Department (September 2013). As of 2011, the United States maintains a non-resident diplomatic mission for Somalia in Nairobi. In addition, the Somalia embassy in the U.S. until recently had as its ambassador-designate Omar Abdirashid Ali Sharmarke, the former Prime Minister of Somalia. The Federal Government of Somalia was established on August 20, 2012, concurrent with the end of the TFG's interim mandate. It represents the first permanent central government in the country since the start of the civil war. On September 10, 2012, the new Federal Parliament also elected Hassan Sheikh Mohamud as the incumbent President of Somalia. The United States government subsequently released a press statement felicitating Mohamud on his victory, and promised to continue partnering with the Somali authorities. In January 2013, the U.S. announced that it was set to exchange diplomatic notes with the new central government of Somalia, re-establishing official ties with the country for the first time in 20 years. According to the Department of State, the decision was made in recognition of the significant progress that the Somali authorities had achieved on both the political and war fronts. The move is expected to grant the Somali government access to new sources of development funds from American agencies as well as international bodies like the International Monetary Fund and World Bank, thereby facilitating the ongoing reconstruction process. In June 2014, in what she described as a gesture of the deepening relations between Washington and Mogadishu and faith in Somalia's stabilization efforts, U.S. Undersecretary of State Wendy Sherman announced that the United States would soon name a new ambassador to Somalia. In February 2015, U.S. President Barack Obama appointed Foreign Service veteran Katherine Simonds Dhanani as the new Ambassador of the United States to Somalia. She is the first official U.S. envoy to the country in over two decades.

=== South America ===
Country	Formal Relations Began	Notes
Brazil		Brazil is accredited to Somalia from its embassy in Nairobi, Kenya.; Somalia does not have an accreditation to Brazil.

== See also ==
- List of diplomatic missions in Somalia
- List of diplomatic missions of Somalia
