= 2022 Central Somalia offensive =

- Part of Somali Civil War (2009–present)
| Date | August 7, 2022 - January 2023 |
| Location | Hiraan, Middle Shabelle, Galguduud, Somalia |
| Result | Inconclusive: 215 inhabited areas recaptured by the government |

Belligerents
| Somalia: Somali National Army; Danab Brigade; Gorgor Special Forces; National Intelligence and Security Agency; Ma'awisley; Hawadle clan; Habar Gidir clan; Some Abgal clans; ATMIS; United States: AFRICOM; Turkey | al-Shabaab |

Commanders and leaders
| Hassan Sheikh Mohamud; Odowaa Yusuf Rageh; Abdikadir Hassan Qoondhe; Yusuf Dhegey Ugas | Yusuf Issa Kaba-katukade; Rakhib Mohamed Hassan †; Abdillahi Ali Araye †; Musab Abdalla Saney †; Sirad Omar Ga'al † |

Casualties and losses
| 361+ SNA and allies killed 6 Djiboutian ATMIS soldiers killed | 1,803+ killed |
- 166+ civilians killed Thousands kidnapped, injured, or displaced

Starting in August 2022, the Somali government and allies launched an offensive against al-Shabaab in the Hiran region of Hirshabelle state, successfully recapturing many areas that had been under al-Shabaab control for decades. The offensive was one of the first acts of Hassan Sheikh Mohamud's presidency, and coincided with a rebellion against al-Shabaab by Ma'awisley clan militias in June 2022. The offensive eventually expanded to Middle Shabelle and Galguduud regions, marking the most successful Somali government offensive in years.

After the government's success in Hirshabelle, it attempted to capitalize on these gains with a second offensive in southern Somalia's South West State and Jubaland in 2023. This offensive, dubbed Operation Black Lion, did not wield as many successes as the Hirshabelle offensive and reversed some Somali government gains made in the first offensive.

== Background ==
The Somali government has been waging a war against the al-Qaeda affiliated Islamist group Al-Shabaab since 2009, backed by the African Union, United States Africa Command, and Ethiopian and Turkish backers. In 2011, the Somali government was successfully able to weaken the group by dismantling its financial apparatus and clearing Mogadishu of al-Shabaab. However, since 2011, al-Shabaab was able to entrench itself in central and southern Somalia despite attempts by the Somali government to dislodge it and the assassinations of al-Shabaab leadership by AU and AFRICOM.

The Habar Gidir, also known as the Salebaan, is the main sub-clan in Bahdo, Galguduud, and is a sub-clan of the Hawiye. Many Habar Gidir practice a Sufi sect of Islam, in contrast to al-Shabaab's strict Salafi jihadist interpretation. In eastern Hiraan, the Hawadle sub-clan had been tense with al-Shabaab since 2021, when the group blocked off a road connecting Beledweyne to Mogadishu and impeding aid deliveries.

=== Prelude ===
In May 2022, Hassan Sheikh Mohamud won election and defeated Mohamed Abdullahi Mohamed Farmaajo in the 2022 Somali presidential election. Farmajo's administration was notoriously weak to al-Shabaab, with the group able to infiltrate into government strongholds like Mogadishu and carry out terrorist attacks. Mohamud said upon taking office in August 2022 that fighting al-Shabaab was his top priority, although prior to the August 20 Hayat Hotel attack he supported peace talks.

In June 2022, organized clan militias dubbed Ma'awisley launched a rebellion against al-Shabaab in Hiraan because the jihadists were harshly imposing taxes and demands to conscript local young men into al-Shabaab's ranks. Armed conflict broke out between the Ma'awisley and al-Shabaab in the town of Bahdo, a Habar Gidir stronghold. At least 70 al-Shabaab fighters were killed in the Ma'awisley's defense of the town. Ma'awisley in Hiraan had organized in 2018 to defend against al-Shabaab for this exact same thing, and other Ma'awisley groups had existed since 2014. The Somali government was supportive of the Ma'awisley and funneled them arms, but were unable to do much until August as the Somali government reformed itself.

In July 2022, al-Shabaab invaded Ethiopia, triggering a strong Ethiopian military response. The Ethiopian government began funneling arms to the Hawadle Ma'awisley, and launching airstrikes on al-Shabaab positions in areas dominated by the Hawadle and the Habar Gidir.

== Hiraan offensive ==
The offensive against al-Shabaab began in August 2022. The first joint attack against al-Shabaab occurred on August 7, when Ethiopian forces launched airstrikes against al-Shabaab in the villages of Bagda, Qabno, and Cowmaad in between Mahas and Mataban District. The airstrikes allowed Somali and Ma'awsiley troops, led by Hiraan governor Ali Jeyte Osman, to capture the three villages attacked along with several other smaller hamlets. The United States also launched airstrikes during this campaign, killing at least four militants on August 8. Over the next few days, Somali government forces began rebuilding the villages destroyed in the fighting.

More villages were cleared by Somali forces on August 14, just southeast of Beledweyne and south of Mataban. US drone strikes aided in this localized offensive, with SNA fighters killing 14 militants and drone strikes killing 13. Between August 15 and 17, at least three more villages were cleared between Beledweyne and Halgan. Somali officials said that 17 militants were killed in the operation. On August 22, Turkish-trained Gorgor Special Forces cleared al-Shabaab from Coomad village, north of Mataban. Gorgor commanders said that at least 60 militants were killed. More villages were captured by the SNA without a fight on August 24.

On August 16, the Somali National Army (SNA) announced that it had fully secured the road connecting Beledweyne and Mataban, in Hiraan region. The SNA said that seven soldiers were killed during the operations to secure the road. That same day, al-Shabaab announced that they killed two Somali soldiers and wounded one in an ambush on an SNA convoy traveling between Teedan and Qodqod in Beledweyne district.

Al-Shabaab launched an ambush on Ma'awisley in the village of El Adde, west of Beledweyne. Villagers said that the ambush killed seven people, although the side of the deceased is unknown.

=== Hayat Hotel attack ===
On August 19, al-Shabaab attacked the Hayat Hotel in Mogadishu in response to the government campaign in Hiraan. The battle for the hotel lasted for nearly 30 hours, killing 22 civilians and injuring upwards of 117 more. The attack on the hotel was the first attack by al-Shabaab on Mogadishu since President Mohamud's inauguration, and the largest siege of a hotel that the group had undertaken. Mohamud released a televised statement after the attack declaring "total war" on al-Shabaab, and urging all Somalis to unite to defeat the group. The new prime minister Hamza Abdi Barre, echoed these statements, calling al-Shabaab "children of hell".

After the Hayat Hotel attack, the Somali government strengthened its commitment to fight al-Shabaab in Hiraan. By September 2022, the Somali offensive in Hiraan had picked up pace in the triangle between Mahas, Mataban, and Beledweyne. That same month, al-Shabaab was forced to vacate its strongholds of Adan Yabaal and Cadale in Hirshabelle. These bases were the dominant areas where al-Shabaab attacked ATMIS forces in the region. Somali forces did not recapture Adan Yabaal and Cadale until December. The Somali government said that by late September, almost all of Hiraan and Galguduud were under Somali government control, although this was not entirely accurate. International Crisis Group assessed that by October, all of Hiraan east of the Shabelle river had been liberated from al-Shabaab.

=== Amplification of Hiraan offensive ===
On September 3, al-Shabaab fighters killed at least 20 civilians in Hiraan. On September 6, al-Shabaab claimed to have killed 50 Ma'awisley members in Mahas district. The following day, the SNA announced that a number of villages were recaptured from al-Shabaab in Mahas. Gorgor forces ambushed an al-Shabaab base in the Daarow mountains on September 9, killing six militants. Two days later, Somali forces liberated the villages of Haro Lugoole and Fiidow in southern Hiraan near Jalalaqsi.

By September 16, the SNA had cleared several villages east of Buloburde and was attempting to recapture Yasooman northeast of Buloburde. The Somali government said that between 30 and 43 militants were killed, and five SNA soldiers were wounded. This death toll was revised to 75 militants killed by September 19. Ma'awisley militants beheaded several captured al-Shabaab fighters near Yasooman during the battle for the city.

Al-Shabaab also assassinated three elders and the son of an elder in Buqda by a roadside IED on September 16. The group blamed the killings on a US drone strike, but the US did not report any drone strike activity. Three days later, al-Shabaab announced that anyone working against the group a target for retaliatory attacks, and called the Ma'awisley infidels.

On September 18, a US airstrike targeting al-Shabaab killed 27 militants and no civilians, and was reported by the US on September 21. The airstrike was part of a wider effort to aid the SNA and Ma'awisley in recapturing the road between Buloberde and Yasooman. The SNA said that over 100 al-Shabaab fighters were killed in the battle for this road.

The village of Booco was captured by Somali government forces for the first time in 13 years on September 20. On September 21, clashes broke out between Somali special forces and al-Shabaab in the town of Somotaro near Buloberde after al-Shabaab shelled Somali positions in Booco, two miles away. In these clashes, al-Shabaab claimed to have killed the regional commanders of the US-trained Danab forces and the Gorgor forces, alongside 40 other soldiers. The Somali government said that eight soldiers were killed. Other villages along the Shabelle river were captured bloodlessly that same day, but al-Shabaab claimed to have killed two in an IED explosion.

The SNA said on September 25 that it had liberated 15 villages in Hiraan, Galguduud and Bay regions, and that at least 30 al-Shabaab fighters were killed in the battle for two villages in Hiraan. On September 27, Somali forces captured Buqda and cleared the town of al-Shabaab, killing 11 militants. The battle of Buqda had been ongoing since September 15. Fighting broke out in Qohle, near Buloberde, on September 29 between al-Shabaab and the SNA and Ma'awisley allies. Al-Shabaab claimed that 20 SNA and allies were killed, while the SNA said that 40 militants were killed and the attack was repulsed.

By the end of September, Somali and Ma'awisley forces had recaptured at least 40 settlements in Hiraan region and six in Galguduud.

On October 3, al-Shabaab bombed Hirshabelle State government buildings in Beledweyne, killing at least 40 civilians and state officials, and injuring 100 more. al-Shabaab also claimed that the bombings killed six Djiboutian ATMIS soldiers. That same day, al-Shabaab re-entered and claimed control over twelve villages vacated by the SNA following a dispute between two SNA commanders. A day later, SNA forces claimed to re-capture Yasooman, which they had first seized on September 20 but were forced to vacate on October 1 with other villages.

=== Battle of Jicibow and Battles of Yasooman and Beero Yabaal ===
The largest battle of the Hiraan offensive was at Jicibow on October 9. Somali Army, Ma'awisley, and Djiboutian ATMIS forces, redeployed from Yasooman and Buloberde, took part in the operation to seize the al-Shabaab controlled city. Al-Shabaab forces had prepared for the attack, having gathered in the area to cut off the road between Buloberde and Beledweyne and recapture villages around Buloberde. On October 11, the SNA claimed that the coalition had killed at least 250 al-Shabaab militants and captured 10 since the start of the battle on October 9. Al-Shabaab's commander for Hiraan, Rakhib Mohamed Hassan, was killed during the battle.

The redeployment of troops from Yasooman and Buloberde, while it allowed SNA forces to recapture Jicibow, also allowed security gaps for al-Shabaab to penetrate, which they did on October 12. Yasooman and Beero Yabaal were attacked by al-Shabaab, with the group saying it captured three SNA bases and killed 117 SNA and Ma'awisley forces. The SNA said that 50 al-Shabaab were killed, the attacks were repelled, and only three SNA soldiers died. A day later, SNA forces from the 21st Division in Galmudug and Ma'awisley reinforcements from the Ayr clan redeployed to Yasooman, implying that the government did not lose control of Yasooman during the al-Shabaab attack.

=== Consolidation of gains ===
Al-Shabaab continued to expand violent attacks against civilians and civilian infrastructure in response to government successes. On October 19, al-Shabaab deployed three VBIEDs in Buloberde, Jalalaqsi, and Beledweyne. The first bomb damaged a bridge, the second was caught by SNA soldiers before the bomber could detonate, and the third was caught before the driver could even move it.

On October 23, SNA and allied forces recaptured Qorfo in Hiraan, a major al-Shabaab stronghold, where the SNA claimed to kill 20 militants. In fighting in Moqokori, near Buloberde, the SNA claimed to have killed al-Shabaab's finance director for Hiraan, Sirad Omar Ga'al. American drones attacked al-Shabaab militants during their assault on SNA forces near Moqokori, with AFRICOM saying two militants and no civilians were killed.

Government and clan forces continued operations to clean out al-Shabaab in villages near Buloberde and Beledweyne in mid-November. A Ma'awisley ambush against al-Shabaab on November 18 in the village of Mabah killed 20 jihadists. An al-Shabaab attempt to capture the village of Burdaar was foiled by the SNA on November 11.

== Galguduud offensive ==
Hiraan was the birthplace of the offensive and the Ma'awisley rebellion, and the Somali government was eager to use the Ma'awisley to liberate other areas of the country. In November, the campaign against al-Shabaab kicked up in Galgaduud, after several months of increasingly-violent al-Shabaab activity near Dhusamareb. However, the Somali government first increased activity in Galguduud as early as September 1, when they invaded six villages on the Hiraan-Galgaduud border.

Government activity reconstituted in Galgaduud on September 18, when SNA and Ma'awisley forces captured the Jaw area, in between the government-controlled town of Guriel and the al-Shabaab controlled town of Elbur. The force deployment was part of SNA preparations to capture Elbur. On September 20, SNA forces captured Sina Dhaqo and other areas in Dusmareb District, killing six. al-Shabaab said that two soldiers were killed during this operation by an IED. Sina Dhaqo became the site of an al-Shabaab ambush on September 22. SNA forces posted images of slain al-Shabaab fighters and claimed 15 were killed, and that the attack was repulsed.

Another al-Shabaab attack, this time on the SNA-controlled Dhisaqa and Adakibir areas, killed at least 50 SNA soldiers according to al-Shabaab. The government countered this claim, saying that the attacks were repulsed and that 30 al-Shabaab fighters were killed and 55 were injured. The Somali government maintained that they had control over the two areas. The next day, the Somali offensive on Elbur stalled after a dispute between SNA and Ma'awisley commanders over the best way to attack al-Shabaab in Elhele, a town between Dhusamareb and Elbur.

After a month of meager territorial changes, SNA and Ma'awisley forces captured the al-Shabaab stronghold of Qayib in Galgaduud on October 25. The SNA said that dozens of militants were killed and an al-Shabaab court was destroyed. Qayib remained in government hands even despite an al-Shabaab counterattack on November 7 that destroyed parts of the SNA base. In this attack, the SNA said that 10 soldiers and 20 militants were killed, and al-Shabaab said that 37 soldiers were killed.

Elbur was finally captured by the SNA and Ma'awisley on November 9, killing 24 militants according to the SNA. Al-Shabaab claimed responsibility for a roadside ambush between Mahas and Elbur near the village of Gorof, saying it killed two SNA soldiers and two al-Shabaab fighters. AFRICOM announced that it had conducted a drone strike on November 9 against al-Shabaab fighters attacking government forces between Mahas and Wabho during the government's offensive on Elbur. At least 17 fighters were killed in this drone strike.

=== Southern Galguduud offensive ===
After the capture of Runirgood on December 22, Somali forces began pushing north from Middle Shabelle into Galguduud. On December 23, SNA forces alongside US drones captured El Ba'ad along the Galguduud-Middle Shabelle border, killing 67 militants.

== Middle Shabelle offensive ==
Northern Middle Shabelle state also fell into the range of pro-government Ma'awisley that enabled the Somali government's successes in Hiraan and Galguduud. Government efforts to support an offensive in Middle Shabelle did not come to fruition as early as the previous two offensives, but kicked up steam in October and November. In Middle Shabelle, clans were much more hesitant to join the government than in Hiraan and Galguduud, and these clans were in the middle of inter-sub-clan conflicts that muddied the alliances for al-Shabaab and the government.

The first notable battle involving Ma'awisley against al-Shabaab took place on October 7 in Muryale, near Bal'ad. Al-Shabaab claimed to overrun an SNA base in the town, killing 12 soldiers. The SNA said that the attack was repelled, and 19 jihadists were killed. Nearby, Somali National Intelligence and Security Agency (NISA) forces and Ma'awisley attacked al-Shabaab and killed nine fighters. On October 15, SNA fighters captured Hawadley from al-Shabaab, killing 30 militants including top leaders. Three days later, at least 17 jihadists were killed in an SNA ambush near Halfoley, and the SNA began clearing at least 12 villages in the Shabelle River Valley near Jowhar. Ten more militants were killed and even more villages cleared by October 20.

Cali Gudud, a major al-Shabaab stronghold in Adale district, was captured by the SNA and Ma'awisley on October 22 with American and Turkish drone support. The SNA said that at least 100 al-Shabaab militants were killed in the battle, including senior commanders Abdillahi Ali Araye and Musab Abdalla Saney. Consolidation operations for the town continued over the next week, with Gorgor and Danab forces participating. Cali Gudud was cleared from al-Shabaab by October 28. The Somali commander in the area, Abdikadir Hassan Qoondhe, said that Somali forces remained in control of Cali Gudud by November 1 and were de-mining the area. In Hawadley however on October 26, a Turkish airstrike targeted 17 al-Shabaab militants according to NISA, implying that the SNA had lost full control of Hawadley since it declared liberation on October 15. This toll was later reported to mark 200 militants killed in the strike.

On November 3, combined SNA, Danab, and Ma'awisley forced captured El Hareri, in Adan Yabaal district. Al-Shabaab said that it had ambushed Ma'awisley in the town on November 3, but a day later Danab and Ma'awisley counterattacked al-Shabaab. According to the SNA, 100 al-Shabaab militants were killed and according to al-Shabaab, 36 SNA militants were killed. American drones supported the Somali effort. An SNA-led coalition captured Cad-Caddewy on November 17. SNA forces and allies captured El Dher on November 26, assisted by US drone strikes. The SNA claimed that 100 al-Shabaab militants were killed including ten commanders.

=== Sub-clan conflicts ===
The biggest roadblock in the Somali offensive in Middle Shabelle was intra-clan conflicts. In liberated areas of Adale district on November 12, opposing sub-clans of the Abgal clan clashed over a land dispute. President Mohamud accused the fighting of being weaponized by "dark forces within and outside the government jeopardizing the fight against the khawarij." Peace talks began on November 16, mediated by local clan elders.

=== Battle of Adan Yabaal ===
By the start of December 2022, Adan Yabaal, the capital of Adan Yabal District, was one of the last al-Shabaab strongholds in southern Middle Shabelle. Adan Yabaal had been under al-Shabaab control since 2009, despite a brief AMISOM seizure in 2016. The town was also the center of al-Shabaab operations in all of Middle Shabelle and extending into other states. The capture of towns of El Dher, Cad-Caddawy, and El Hareri all served as strategic outposts for the SNA in its upcoming offensive on Adan Yabaal. On December 1, al-Shabaab reinstated Yusuf Isse Kabakatukade as shadow governor of Middle Shabelle.

Al-Shabaab militants ambushed SNA and allies on December 1 at the village of Nur Dagle, near Adan Yabaal. The group claimed to have killed 14 SNA soldiers. The SNA claimed to repulse the attack and kill 40 militants. The Somali government also said that al-Shabaab killed 10 civilians to deter them from rebelling against the group. The SNA continued its offensive around Adan Yabaal in the coming days, clearing villages south of Adan Yabaal between Adan Yabaal and Ali Gudud, and the town of Mabah to the north. 16 al-Shabaab fighters were killed, and five SNA and Ma'awisley were killed. In these operations, SNA and Ma'awisley clashed with al-Shabaab in two villages along one of two roads that enters Adan Yabaal from the south; the other road was secured by the SNA allies. Turkish and American drone strikes supported the SNA in a battle with al-Shabaab near the village of Juhay on December 4.

SNA and allies entered the outskirts of Adan Yabaal on December 4, after the majority of al-Shabaab forces fled the area a day prior. The town was secured on December 5 without a fight. The capture of Adan Yabaal was the largest success of the Somali government offensive thus far, and the most important al-Shabaab controlled town to be captured by the SNA.

==== Runirgood and Adan Yabaal district offensive ====
Immediately after the capture of Adan Yabaal, al-Shabaab mounted a resistance south of the town, where they still held some power. On December 7, they claimed to have recaptured the Furqan area south of Adan Yabaal. This didn't hinder the Somali government offensive; on December 10 the SNA and allies captured Dhabaq Labey, killing 14 al-Shabaab militants, and on December 12 seized the IED manufacturing hub of al-Kowthar. That same day, Ma'awisley and SNA forces captured El Muluq. These seizures were part of a government strategy to capture Runirgod District and its capital of Runirgod, the last major al-Shabaab controlled town in Middle Shabelle.

Despite the SNA clearing the area months prior, al-Shabaab maintained a presence in forested villages around Jowhar. The manager of the Jowhar airport was assassinated by al-Shabaab on December 11, and the explosion killed a bodyguard and injured several others. That same day, the SNA and Ma'awisley conducted a clearing operation in villages near Mahaday, killing 34 militants. In Juhay village, an al-Shabaab camp was destroyed and 88 militants killed in an SNA offensive backed by American drones. AFRICOM said that seven militants were killed in their drone strike on Juhay.

The village of Daru Na'im was the site of a battle between the SNA and al-Shabaab on December 17. SNA officials claimed to have killed 50 al-Shabaab militants in clearing the village; al-Shabaab claimed 19 SNA were killed and 13 were wounded. AFRICOM said that a US drone strike killed eight militants. Three days, later, the SNA announced that eight militants, including four high-ranking al-Shabaab commanders, were taken prisoner.

Runirgood was captured on December 22, ending al-Shabaab control over major towns in Middle Shabelle.

== Slowdown and clan conflict ==
The town of Wabho and its capture by the SNA and Ma'awisley on November 9 was quickly reversed on November 13, when al-Shabaab took the town without a fight. According to International Crisis Group, Wabho was captured by "overly enthusiastic clan forces" who were forced to withdraw after heavy al-Shabaab resistance, and had to seek help from Danab special forces. At this same time, the government offensive south of Qayib was floundering due to the offensive entering territory of clans not sympathetic to the government. Al-Shabaab had reached out to clans in this area, and had allied with some.

Offensives in Middle Shabelle, Galguduud, and Hiraan had all slowed down by the end of November, despite government efforts to keep them going. The Somali government had been planning offensives elsewhere in the country using the Ma'awisley and clan alliances, but unlike in Hiraan and Galguduud, they were forced to coax clans into joining the government instead of accepting fervently anti-al-Shabaab clans into their midst where none existed.

Additionally, al-Shabaab reverted to its strategy of abandoning major bases including Adan Yabaal to reconstitute in the bush, and recapture the bases later. By early January 2023, they began recruiting from the Abgal Warsengali clan near the village of Towfiq near Jowhar; the clan had previously stayed neutral in the war. In a meeting with clan elders later on, the group signed an agreement with Habar Gidir Salebaan elders to not participate in Somali government efforts in Galmudug.

=== Hiraan and Galguduud ===
The government offensive on the al-Shabaab stronghold of Adan Yabaal in early December forced the Somali government and Ma'awisley to divert forces and attention from villages it had gained in Hiraan and Galguduud in previous months.

Qayib was attacked by al-Shabaab on November 28, and the group claimed to overrun the SNA base. The SNA denied these claims, but later reported that they had withdrawn from Qayib. An attack on Buurweyn in Hiraan by al-Shabaab was repelled on December 7. A day later, al-Shabaab claimed to capture Beer Hani in Hiraan from Ma'awisley, but Ma'awisley denied these claims. Al-Shabaab also conducted a roadside attack just 15 miles from Dhusamareb.

The largest attack in these regions for the rest of 2022 was at El Ba'ad, near El Dher in Galmudug. An AFRICOM drone strike targeted a gathering of al-Shabaab militants in El Ba'ad, with the SNA saying 67 militants were killed. AFRICOM said that six militants were killed. Al-Shabaab also abandoned villages around El Dher, including the strategic village of Masagaway, between December 27 and January 3, leading SNA forces to control it.

In early January, al-Shabaab ramped up its attacks in Hiraan and Galguduud, particularly through VBIEDs. Two bombings in Mahas and Buloberde on January 4 killed at least 20 people; al-Shabaab said that 87 were killed and 130 injured. Al-Shabaab also claimed to capture a Ma'awisley base in Duduna'ad in Hiraan, although local officials said that the group only controlled the base briefly. Buq Qoosar, a village held by al-Shabaab since 2015, was liberated by the SNA in a battle that killed 10 jihadists on January 3.

== War crimes ==
Al-Shabaab was noted for its particular targeting of civilians throughout the offensive. In 2022 alone, there was a 41% increase in attacks on civilians by al-Shabaab, likely due to the government offensive and clans. Hiraan was the most active region for increases in civilian retaliation; ACLED marked a 366% increase in civilian attacks by al-Shabaab compared to 2021.

These attacks occurred at the very start of the offensive in Hiraan in late August, when al-Shabaab embarked on a campaign to destroy wells in villages that were soon to be captured by the SNA and Ma'awisley. Seven villages were torched in Hiraan in late August by al-Shabaab. On September 2, a humanitarian convoy carrying food to civilians was massacred by al-Shabaab, killing women and children.

After the government capture of Adan Yabaal in December, al-Shabaab destroyed wells and forced civilians to flee the town with the militants. Twenty Hawadle civilians were kidnapped near Beledweyne and tortured by al-Shabaab on January 2.
