= Somalia–Sudan relations =

- Somalia: Sudan

Somalia–Sudan relations refer to the bilateral and diplomatic ties between the Federal Republic of Somalia and the Republic of the Sudan.

== History ==
Both Somalia and Sudan are members of the Arab League and the Organisation of Islamic Cooperation, sharing historical, cultural, and religious ties as predominantly Muslim nations. Formal relations were established after the independence of both states; Sudan in 1956 and Somalia in 1960. In the early post-independence period, relations were generally cordial, framed within the context of third-worldism and African unity.

During the early rule of Siad Barre, Somalia's alignment with the Soviet Union and Sudan's shifting alliances under Gaafar Nimeiry created periods of strategic divergence. However, their shared membership in the Arab League provided a consistent diplomatic forum.

A significant strain occurred in the 1970s due to the activities of the Somali Salvation Democratic Front (SSDF), an opposition group seeking to overthrow Siad Barre. The SSDF was initially based in Ethiopia but was also alleged to have received support from Sudan, among other regional states, leading to diplomatic tensions with the Barre government.

With the establishment of the permanent Federal Government of Somalia in 2012, bilateral relations have entered a more structured phase. Both countries have maintained diplomatic exchanges, often focusing on regional security within the Horn of Africa and the Red Sea basin.

In 2023, following the outbreak of the 2023 Sudan conflict between the Sudanese Armed Forces (SAF) and the Rapid Support Forces (RSF), the Somali government issued statements calling for an immediate ceasefire and a peaceful resolution. The conflict also impacted the Somali diaspora community residing in Sudan, prompting the Somali government to facilitate evacuation efforts for its citizens.

The government of Somalia, led by Hassan Sheikh Mohamud, has maintained military ties with the SAF during the war, agreeing to provide military training and resources to the Sudanese forces. In January 2025, the Somali government agreed to host SAF troops at Camp TURKSOM for training, as part of a plan jointly supported by the governments of Somalia, Turkey, Egypt and Eritrea to bolster military support to the SAF.

== Diplomatic missions ==
Both nations maintain embassies in each other's capitals, with Somalia operating an embassy in Khartoum and Sudan operating one in Mogadishu.

== See also ==
- Foreign relations of Somalia
- Foreign relations of Sudan
- Horn of Africa
