= Battle of Jicibow =

- Part of 2022 Central Somalia offensive
| Date | October 9, 2022 |
| Location | near Jicibow, Hiraan, Somalia |
| Result | Somali victory |

Belligerents
| Somalia; Ma'awisley; ATMIS: Djibouti | al-Shabaab |

Commanders and leaders
| Unknown | Rakhib Mohamed Hassan † |

Casualties and losses
| 3 killed Few injured (per Somalia) | 250+ killed (per Somalia) |

On October 9, troops form the Somali National Army (SNA) and allied Ma'awisley clan fighters attacked the city of Jicibow, an al-Shabaab controlled village in Hiraan. The battle was one of the largest Somali successes during the 2022 Central Somalia offensive.

== Background ==
In July 2022, following a clan rebellion against al-Shabaab in north-central Somalia's Hiraan region, the Somali government and allied Ma'awisley clan militias launched an offensive against al-Shabaab in Hiraan region, later expanding to Galguduud and Middle Shabelle regions. The offensive was a success initially, with the SNA and Ma'awisley capturing key roadways and liberating the eastern part of Hiraan.

Just prior to the battle, Somali forces and Ma'awisley captured Yasooman, a key al-Shabaab base.

== Battle ==
Forces from the SNA, Ma'awisley, and Djiboutian troops of ATMIS took part in the battle for Jicibow. Al-Shabaab had attempted to ambush Somali and allied forces at Jicibow and cut off the road connecting Beledweyne and Buloburde, but were thwarted by the Somali government. They had attacked the area from the west by boat. After an initial skirmish between allied elements and al-Shabaab along a riverbank near Jicibow, Somali forces deployed reinforcements from Yasooman and Buloberde to defeat al-Shabaab. Hirshabelle Security Minister Mohamed Abdirahman Khayre said that al-Shabaab forces retreated to a mountain near the village, where they were surrounded. The Djiboutian ATMIS forces shelled the militants, with unknown results. Fighting ended after ten hours.

Initial reports from Somali state media said that 200 militants were killed in the battle, and no Somali casualties were reported. On October 11, SONNA reported that 250 al-Shabaab militants were killed, 10 were captured, and a large quantity of weapons were seized. Khayre said that one Ma'awisley militant and two Somali soldiers were killed, and that there were few injuries. The al-Shabaab militants who participated in the battle were reportedly sent from Bakool Region.

== Aftermath ==
Following the battle, Somali media said that the al-Shabaab commander for Hiraan region, Rakhib Mohamed Hassan, was killed in the battle at Jicibow.

The redeployment of troops from Yasooman allowed for security gaps, and al-Shabaab conducted attacks on the village on October 12 as well. Al-Shabaab claimed 117 SNA and allied fighters were killed in the attacks.
