= Somalia–Turkey relations =

- Somalia: Turkey

Diplomatic mission
- Embassy of Somalia, Ankara: Embassy of Turkey, Mogadishu

Somalia–Turkey relations are bilateral relations between Somalia and Turkey. The two nations are longstanding partners, engaging in close development cooperation. Somalia has an embassy in Ankara, and Turkey has an embassy in Mogadishu, which is the biggest Turkish embassy in the world.

== History ==
=== Middle ages ===
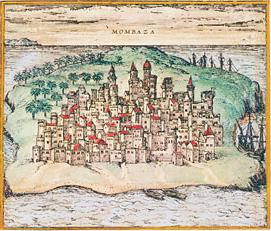
In 1660, the Portuguese in Mombasa surrendered to a joint Somali-Ottoman force.

Relations between the present-day territories of Somalia and Turkey date back to the Middle Ages. The Ajuran Empire and Adal Sultanate maintained good trade and military relations with the Ottoman Empire. The Ajuran Empire received assistance from Ottomans, and with the import of firearms through the Muzzaffar port of Mogadishu, the army began acquiring muskets and cannons. The Ottomans would also remain a key ally during the Ajuran-Portuguese wars.

Over the course of the 16th century, Somali-Portuguese tensions would remain high and the increased contact between Somali sailors and Ottoman corsairs worried the Portuguese, who in 1542 sent a punitive expedition against Mogadishu led by João de Sepúvelda. The Portuguese fleet briefly attacked Mogadishu, capturing an Ottoman ship and firing upon the city, which compelled the sultan of Mogadishu to sign a peace treaty with the Portuguese. Ottoman-Somali cooperation against the Portuguese in the Indian Ocean reached a high point in the 1580s when Ajuran clients of the Somali coastal cities began to sympathize with the Arabs and Swahilis under Portuguese rule and sent an envoy to the Turkish corsair Mir Ali Beg for a joint expedition against the Portuguese. He agreed and was joined by a large Somali fleet, which began attacking Portuguese colonies in Southeast Africa.

The Somali-Ottoman offensive managed to drive out the Portuguese from several important cities such as Pate, Mombasa and Kilwa and remove the Portuguese influence within the Indian Ocean. The Ajuran's Somali forces would eventually militarily defeat the Portuguese. The Ottoman Empire would also remain an economic partner of the Somalis. Throughout the 16th and 17th centuries, successive Ajuran Empire defied the Portuguese economic monopoly in the Indian Ocean by employing a new coinage which followed the Ottoman pattern, thus proclaiming an attitude of economic independence in regard to the Portuguese.

The Ottoman Empire also had a great relationship with the Adal Sultanate. The two states were allies during the Abyssinian–Adal conflict, where the Ottomans sided with the Adalites and the Portuguese sided with the Abyssinians.

=== Colonial times ===
During the colonization of Africa, the Ottomans used many ways to protect Somalia from colonization using diplomatic, religious and political relations.

=== Present day ===
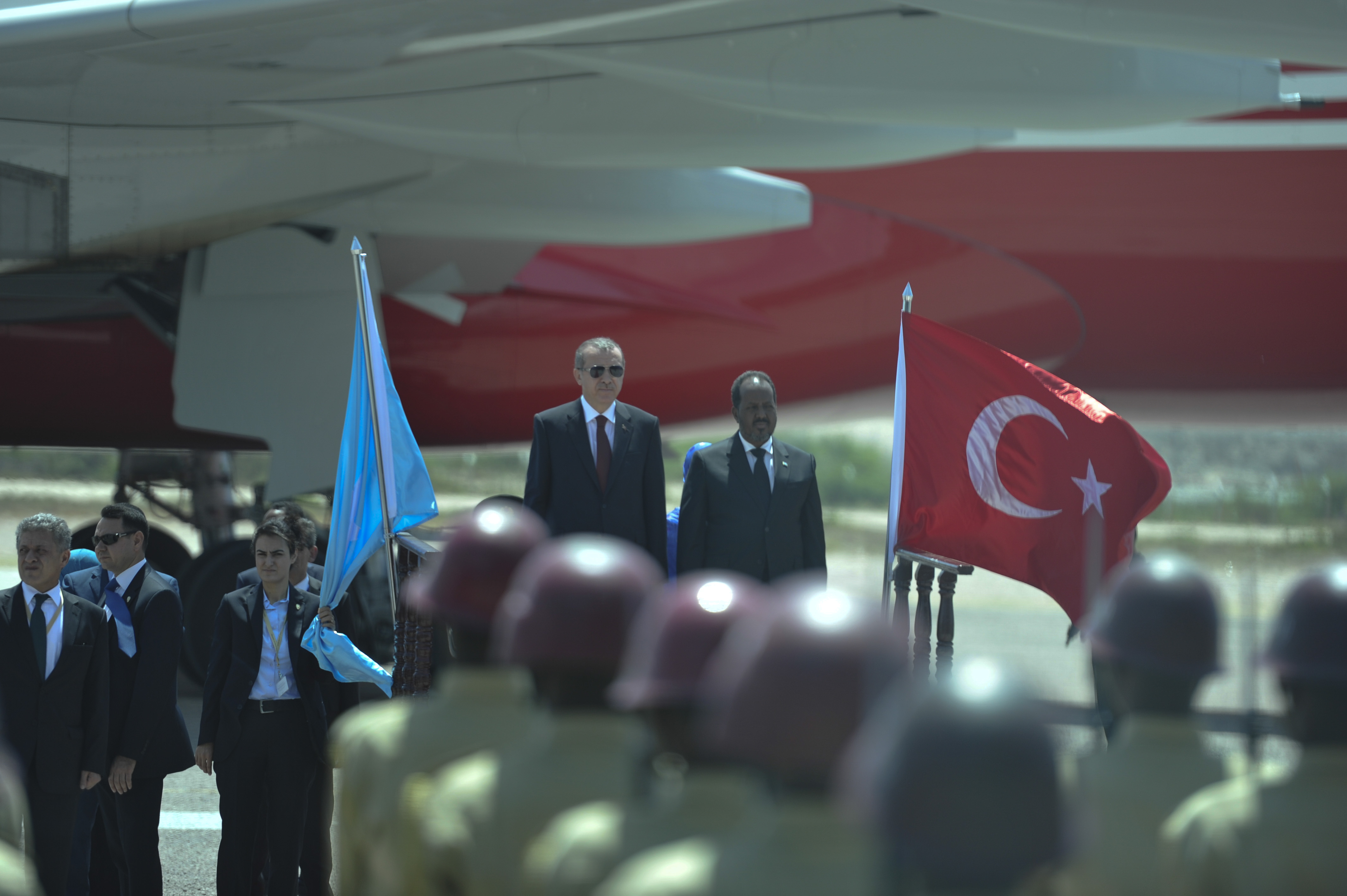
Former and current Somali President Hassan Sheikh Mohamud welcomes Erdoğan in Mogadishu, 25 January 2015

In 1969, Somalia and Turkey were among the founding members of the Organisation of Islamic Cooperation (OIC).

Turkey originally maintained an embassy in Mogadishu, Somalia's capital, until the outbreak of the Somali Civil War in 1991. It subsequently discontinued operations due to security reasons.

Over the ensuing interim period, the Turkish authorities continued relations with Somalia's newly established Transitional National Government and its successor the Transitional Federal Government through their non-resident diplomatic mission in Addis Ababa.

Following a greatly improved security situation in Mogadishu in mid-2011, and a visit by then Turkish Prime Minister Recep Tayyip Erdoğan (the first by a non-African leader since George H. W. Bush's visit during New Year 1993), the Turkish government re-opened its foreign embassy with the intention of more effectively assisting in the post-conflict development process. It was among the first foreign administrations to resume formal diplomatic relations with Somalia after the civil war.

The Federal Government of Somalia was later established on August 20, 2012, representing the first permanent central government in the country since the start of the conflict. The following month, Hassan Sheikh Mohamud was elected as the new government's first President. The election was welcomed by the Turkish authorities, who re-affirmed Turkey's continued support for Somalia's government, its territorial integrity and sovereignty.

In January 2015, President of Somalia Mohamud and newly elected President of Turkey Erdoğan also inaugurated a number of new Turkish-built development projects in Mogadishu.

== Development cooperation ==
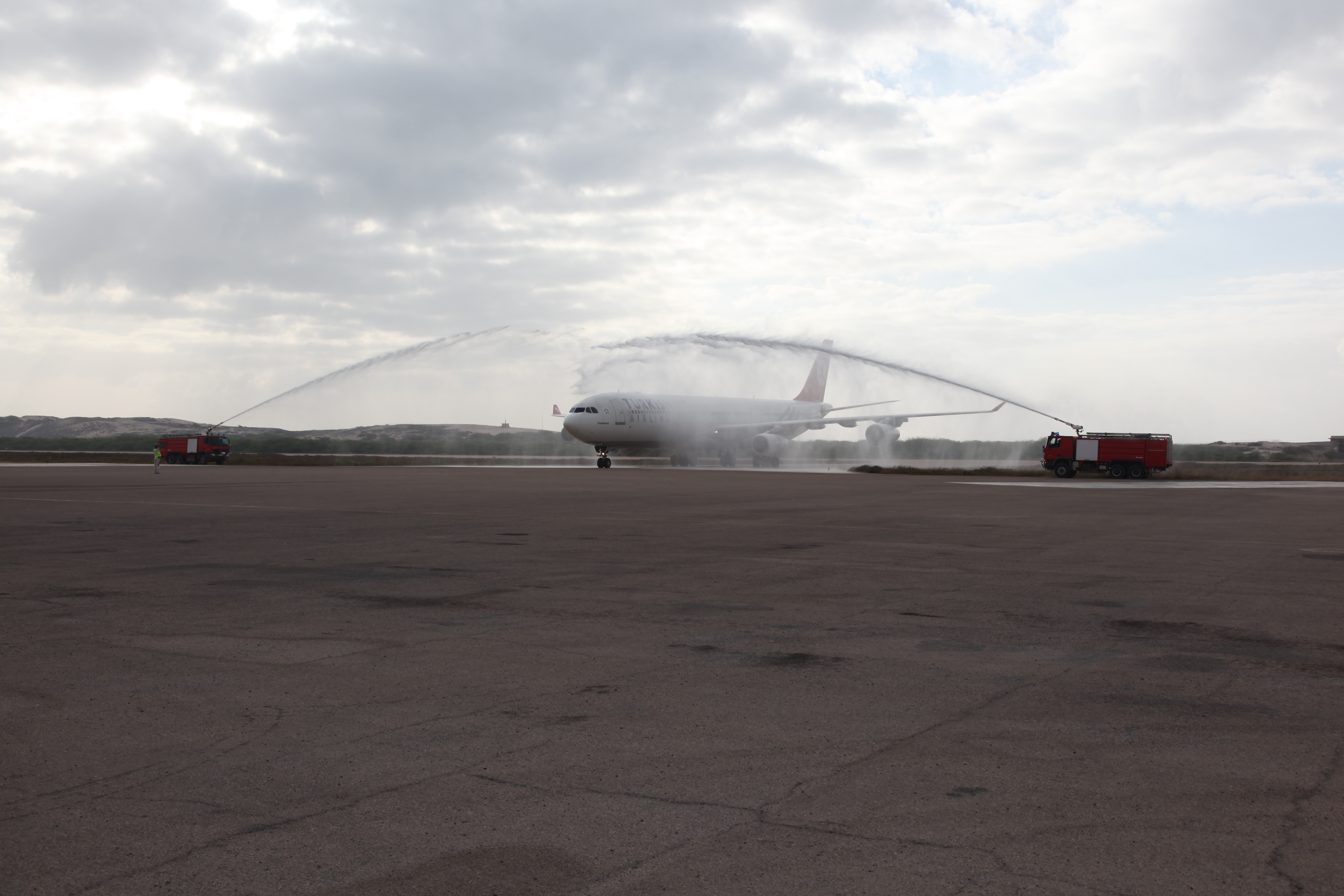
Turkish Airlines is the first international commercial airline company to fly long distance to Somalia

Development cooperation between Somalia and Turkey is multi-tiered, and includes military, social, economic and infrastructural partnerships.

During the drought of 2011, Turkey contributed over $201 million to the humanitarian relief efforts in the impacted parts of Somalia. In partnership with the Somali government, Turkish officials have also launched various development and infrastructure projects in Somalia. They have assisted in the building of several hospitals, and helped renovate and rehabilitate the Aden Adde International Airport and the National Assembly building, among other initiatives.

Turkish Airlines became the first long-distance international commercial airline in two decades to resume flights to and from Mogadishu's Aden Adde International Airport. In September 2013, the Turkish company Favori LLC also began operations at the airport. The firm announced plans to renovate the aviation building and construct a new one, as well as upgrade other modern service structures. A $10 million project, it will increase the airport's existing 15 aircraft capacity to 60.

In May 2013, the 1st Turkish-Somali Business Forum was launched in Istanbul to highlight commercial opportunities in both Somalia and Turkey for Somali and Turkish businesses. Organized by the Somali Council in conjunction with Somali and Turkish government ministries, the event included roundtable discussions on potential commercial ventures in both countries as well as business-to-business meetings between Somali and Turkish firms.

In January 2015, Mohamud and Erdoğan concurrently inaugurated a number of new Turkish-built development projects in Somalia, including the Digfer Hospital in the capital. It was concurrently renamed Erdoğan Hospital in honour of Erdoğan. The new 200-bed Somalia-Turkey Training and Research Hospital was constructed by Turkey's international development body, the Turkish International Cooperation and Development Agency (TIKA), in accordance with an earlier Somalia-Turkey bilateral agreement. It has a $135.7 million operating budget, $85.6 million of which is slated to be covered by the Turkish authorities over the next five years. The 13,500 square-meter indoor premises includes 20 incubators, 14 newborn intensive care beds, 12 intensive care beds, 4 operating rooms, a delivery room, and laboratory and radiology units, with general surgery, neurosurgery, plastic surgery, children, maternity, urology, internal medicine, anesthesia, dental and ocular departments. It will be staffed by 91 Somali and 52 Turkish hospital administrators, head doctors, administrative directors or financial directors, as well as 40 Somali and 5 Turkish security personnel. Around 36 Somali assistants are also scheduled to participate in the facility's annual training program.

Additionally, Mohamud and Erdoğan launched a new terminal at the Aden Adde International Airport. The facility was built by Kozuva, a private Turkish construction firm. Both sides also agreed to formulate a city plan for Mogadishu, with new residences slated for construction. The initial building phase will target 10,000 homes, which Erdoğan suggested would be completed within 12 to 24 months.

In January 2020, the Turkish government stated that Somalia invited Turkey to explore oil in its seas.

In December 2024, Turkey successfully mediated a historic agreement between Somalia and Ethiopia, resolving longstanding tensions over Somaliland's sovereignty and Ethiopia's access to the Red Sea. This diplomatic achievement underscores Turkey's growing influence in the Horn of Africa, as it continues to strengthen political and economic ties with both nations.

== Agreements ==
In May 2010, the Somali and Turkish governments signed a military training agreement, in keeping with the provisions outlined in the Djibouti Peace Process. Enforcement of the pact officially began in November 2012. Outlining training, technical and scientific cooperation, the treaty includes joint-service exercises between both national militaries and exchanges of delegations and personnel. It also encompasses training by the Turkish Military Medical Academy and Mapping General Command, between the gendarmerie and coast guard, as well as in-field training and education at national military installations and institutions. Additionally, the agreement includes provisions for the mutual exchange of information vis-a-vis military history, publications and museology.

In October 2013, Somalia's federal Cabinet endorsed an agreement with the Turkish firm Al-Bayrak to manage the Port of Mogadishu for a 20-year period. According to the Prime Minister's Office, the deal was secured by the Ministry of Ports and Public Works, and also assigns Al-Bayrak responsibility for rebuilding and modernizing the port. In September 2014, the Federal Government of Somalia officially delegated management of the Mogadishu Port to Al-Bayrak. The Turkish company's head Ahmed Salim indicated that under the terms of the agreement, 55% of revenue generated at the seaport will go to the Somali authorities and the remaining 45% is earmarked for the firm. The majority of Al-Bayrak's revenue share will in turn be re-invested in the seaport through additional port-based trade and new docks, construction materials and machinery. According to Somalia's Minister for Transports and Seaport Yussuf Maolim Amin, the management transfer is expected to double the federal authorities' income from the Port. Al-Bayrak's modernization project will cost $80 million.

In February 2014, Somali Army Chief of Staff Brigadier General Dahir Adan Elmi signed a follow-up military agreement in Mogadishu with a delegation from the Turkish Ministry of Defense. The pact stipulates that the government of Turkey will soon launch a training regimen in Somalia for a portion of the Somali National Army. Some SNA soldiers will also receive training in Turkey.

In January 2015, Foreign Affairs Minister of Somalia Abdirahman Duale Beyle and a Turkish delegation signed a bilateral treaty on new development projects that are scheduled to be implemented in Somalia. Among the agreements was a protocol stating that the new Digfer Hospital in Mogadishu would be jointly operated. The accord stipulates that the institution will be funded for its first five years by the Turkish Ministry of Health, which will likewise provide professional specialists. Per the protocol, the hospital will thereafter be fully managed by the Somali authorities. Further development agreements were signed pertaining to military and security cooperation, police support and coordination, marine transportation, youth, and sports projects, and cooperation between Somali National Television and Turkish National Radio.

In May 2015, the Ministry of Commerce and Industrialization of Somalia signed an agreement with the Turkish company PGM Inspection. The treaty delegates management of the ministry's new quality assurance system on imported and exported products to the firm.

== National reconciliation ==
On April 13, 2013, Somali President Hassan Sheikh Mohamud resumed reconciliation talks between the central government in Mogadishu and the regional authorities in Hargeisa. Mediated by the government of Turkey in Ankara, the meeting ended with a signed agreement between Mohamud and Ahmed Mahamoud Silanyo, President of the northwestern Somaliland region, agreeing to allocate fairly to the Somaliland region its portion of the development aid earmarked for Somalia as a whole and to cooperate on security.

== Diplomatic missions ==
Somalia maintains an embassy in Ankara. The diplomatic mission is led by Ambassador Mohamed Mursal Sheikh, with Abdukadir Mohamed Nur serving as First Secretary (Consular & Legal Affairs).

Turkey's embassy in Mogadishu is headed by Ambassador Olgan Bekar, who was appointed to the position in June 2014. As of January 2015, the government of Turkey is constructing a new embassy compound in Mogadishu. The diplomatic mission will occupy an area of 10,000 square meters within a larger 80,000-square meter complex, and is eventually expected to be one of the largest Turkish embassies in the world.

== Military cooperation ==
In September 2017, a Turkish military base was formally inaugurated in Mogadishu. Over 10,000 Somali soldiers were to be trained at the facility. At the date of its construction, it was the largest overseas military facility built and managed by Turkey.

== See also ==
- Foreign relations of Somalia
- Foreign relations of Turkey
