= Gorgor Special Forces =

Special Forces unit in Somalia

- Ciidamada Gaarka ah ee Gorgor
- Active: 2017-present
- Country: Somalia
- Branch: Somali National Army
- Type: Special Forces
- Garrison/HQ: Mogadishu, Somalia
- Colors: Olive green and black
- Anniversaries: 12 April (Armed Forces Day)
- Engagements: 2025 Shabelle offensive, Counter-terrorism in Somalia

Commanders
- Current commander: Lieutenant Colonel Hassan Salaad Abdi
- Notable commanders: Major Mohamed Abdiwahid †

Gorgor (English: The Eagle) is a Somali special forces unit established in 2017 through a bilateral agreement with Turkey, with training conducted in Isparta, Turkey, and at Camp TURKSOM in Mogadishu. Gorgor units have been trained at the Turkish Commando Training Centre at Isparta. They have played an increasing role in the Somali government's campaign against Al-Shabaab.

== History ==
The Gorgor Special Forces were created in 2017 as an elite unit within the Somali National Army. Their creation formed part of Turkey's broader support for Somalia's military development. Camp TURKSOM in Mogadishu has provided finishing training to large numbers of Gorgor trainees returning from Turkey.

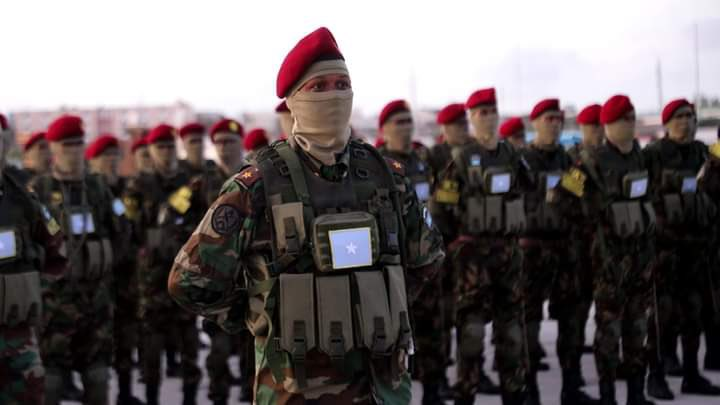
8th unit of Gorgor Special Forces arrive at Aden Adde International Airport in September, 2021.

Following their training in Turkey and at the TURKSOM base in Mogadishu, Gorgor units were actively deployed in frontline counterterrorism operations across central Somalia. They are documented as leading raids on Al-Shabaab strongholds in Galgadud including in El Ali, Afrah, El-Timir, and Towfiq and conducting operations to deter incursions and remove explosives in the Galcad area.

Their missions reportedly included joint offensives alongside other Somali National Army units, notably the US-trained Danab, targeting Al-Shabaab positions in regions such as Galmudug and Hirshabelle. Gorgor forces have received public commendations from President Hassan Sheikh Mohamud, who praised their role in reclaiming territory and advancing national security during the ongoing counterterrorism campaign.

In February 2021, amid a political impasse caused by delayed elections, Gorgor Special Forces were deployed in Mogadishu to manage tensions surrounding opposition protests. The unit cleared opposition supporters from Daljirka Dahsoon square to disrupt a planned opposition march scheduled for February 20. Gorgor troops were ordered to storm the Maida Hotel, where several former Somali presidents were staying, but reportedly declined to carry out this operation. This period involved intense political rivalry between then-President Mohamed Abdullahi Farmaajo's administration and opposition leaders contesting election delays. Turkish military trainers, who had been involved in training Gorgor forces, cautioned the Federal Government of Somalia against deploying these elite units for political purposes, emphasizing the importance of maintaining their neutrality during the electoral crisis.

Following their involvement in managing protests in February 2021, Gorgor Special Forces played a more direct combat role in April 2021 amid Somalia's escalating political crisis. After the Federal Parliament extended President Mohamed Abdullahi Farmaajo's term by two years, armed clashes erupted in Mogadishu between government-aligned troops including elite units like Gorgor and opposition-aligned forces.

On June 3, 2021, Major Mohamed Abdiwahid, commander of the 6th Battalion of the Gorgor Special Forces, was killed in combat during a confrontation between Somali National Army forces and Al-Shabaab militants in southern Somalia. Somali security officials extended their condolences and reaffirmed their commitment to continuing counterterrorism efforts.

== Onganization ==
- 1st Gorgor Division
  - 18th Gorgor Brigade
  - 21st Gorgor Brigade,
- 17th Gorgor Brigade
  - 175th Battalion
  - 19th Gorgor Brigades

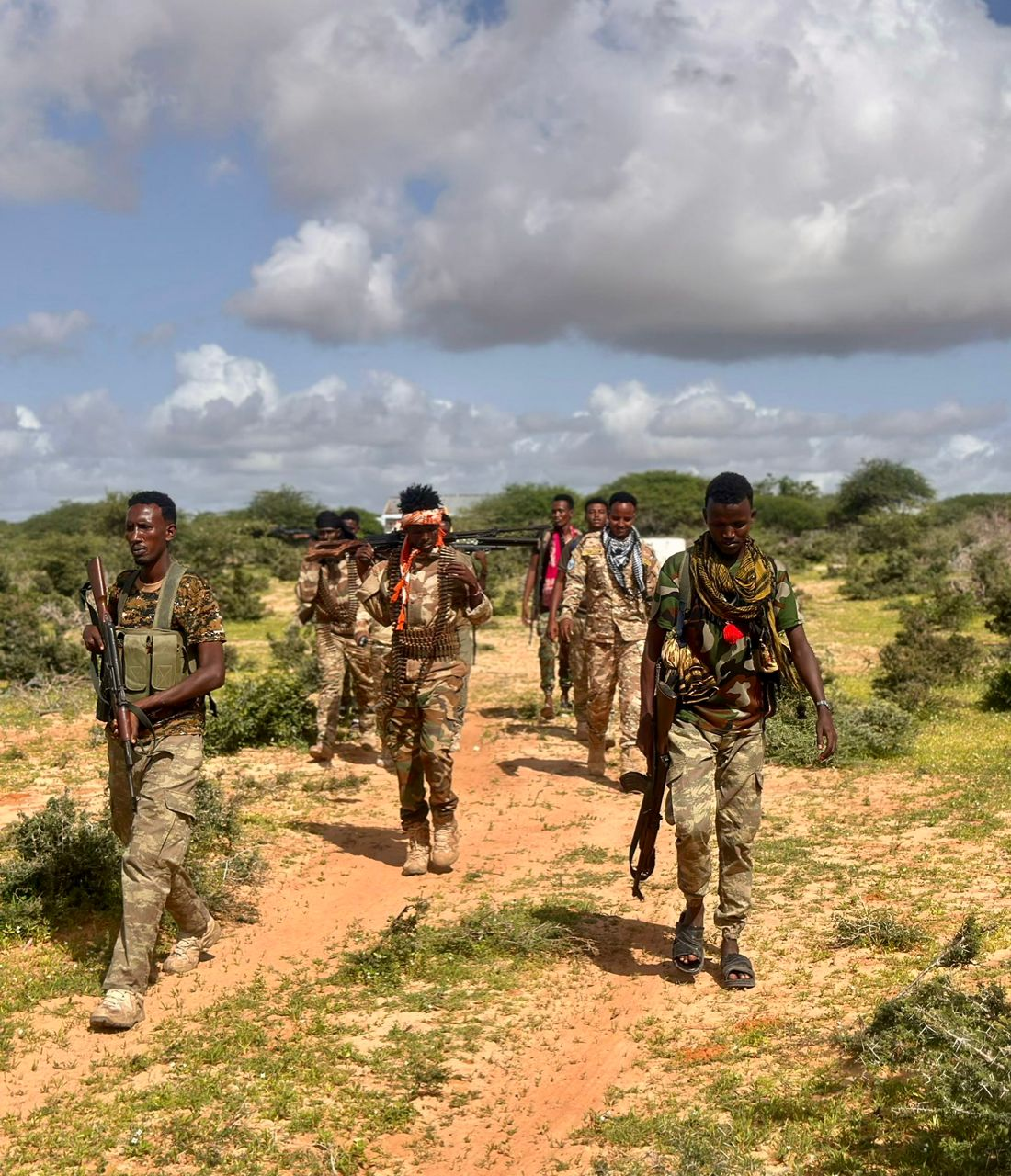
Gorgor patrol in Middle Shabelle region, May 2026

== Equipment ==
Equipment	Type / Description	Country of Manufacture	Inventory	Notes / Sources
Firearms
MPT-76	Standard battle rifle	Turkey	450	
MKE MG3	General-purpose machine gun	Turkey		
Vehicles
BMC Kirpi	Armored personnel carrier	Turkey	20	12 delivered in August 2020 and 8 more were later received by August 15, 2021

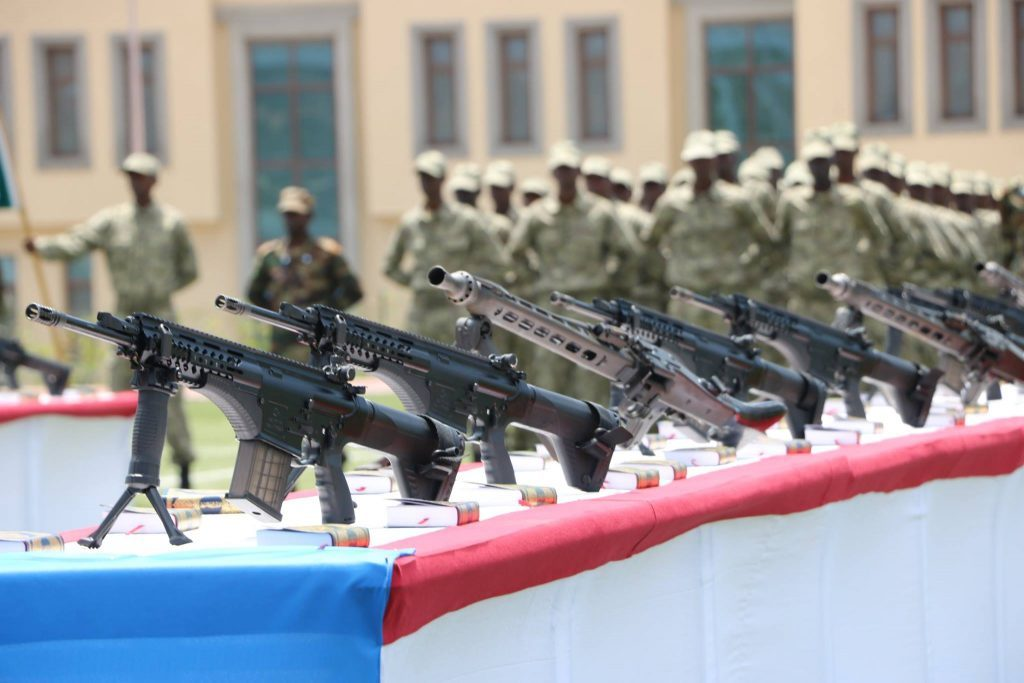
Gorgor forces display MPT-76, MPT-55 rifles, and an MG3 machine gun during a TURKSOM graduation ceremony.

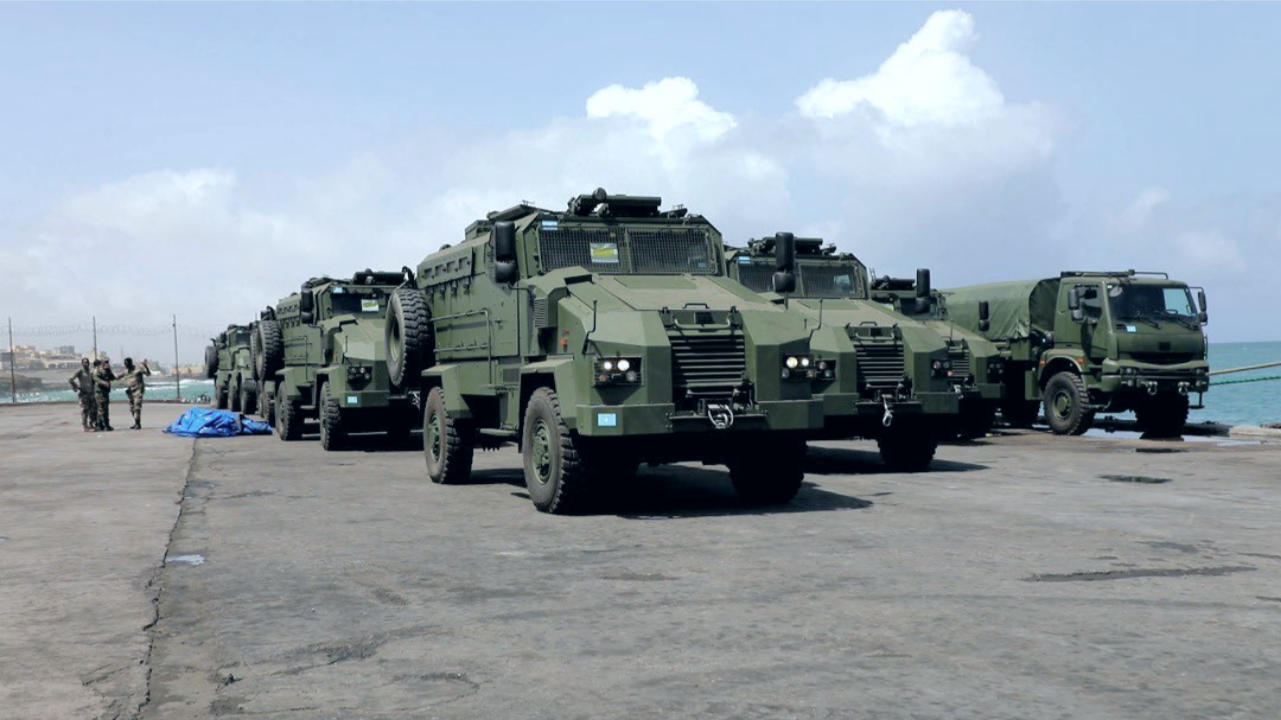
Turkish-made BMC Kirpi MRAPs used by Gorgor Special Forces.

== Uniforms ==
Gorgor Special Forces are known to wear three distinct types of uniforms. The most commonly seen is the Turkish Army woodland camouflage. In addition, they wear digital woodland camouflage (TSK Kamuflaj) of the Turkish army and also a Digital Earth-Tone Vegetation Camouflage, which is uniquely worn only by Gorgor worldwide. These variations may reflect different training stages, environments or operational needs, distinguishing Gorgor from regular Somali National Army units.

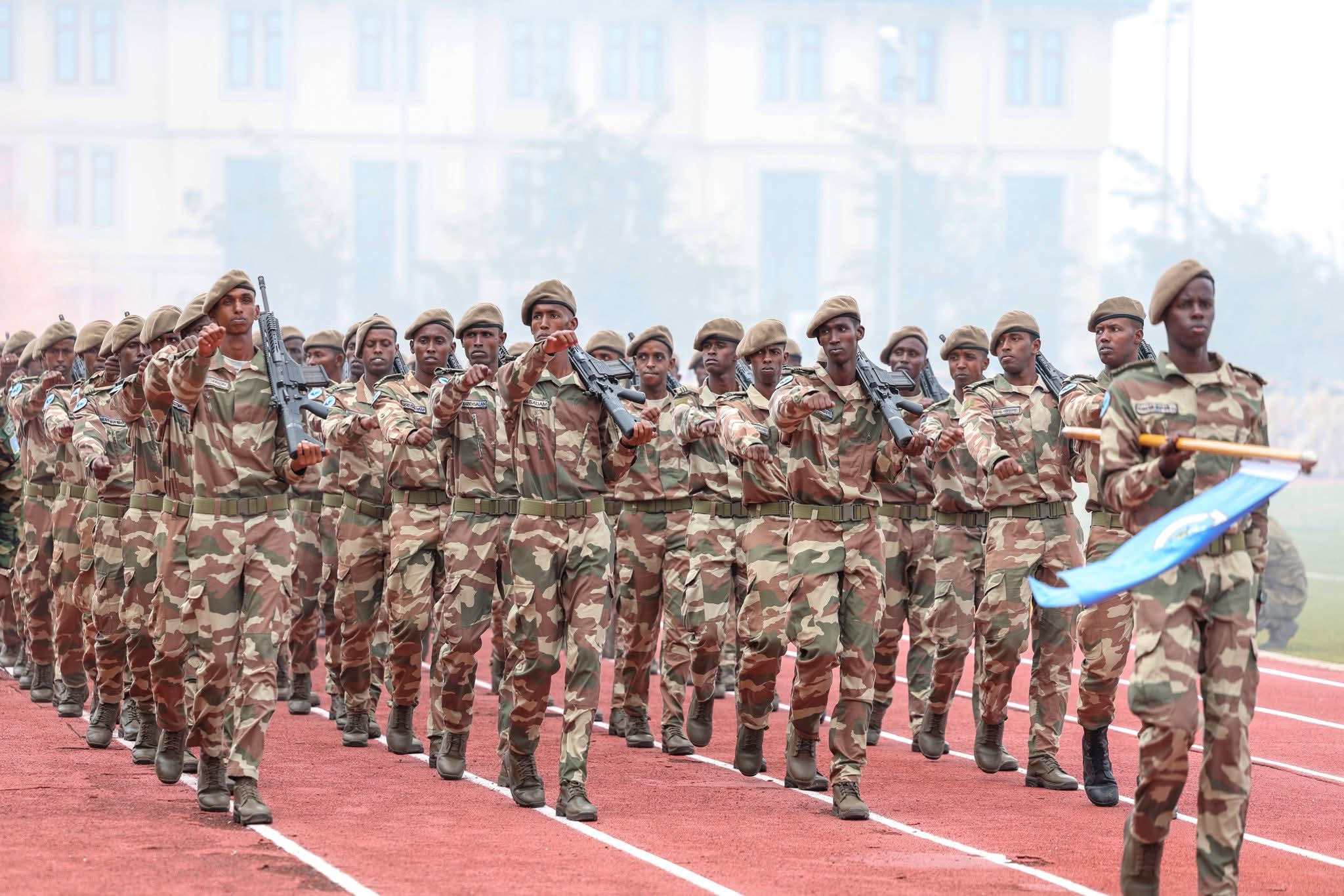
Gorgor Special Forces wearing Turkish woodland camouflage during a parade at the TURKSOM base in Mogadishu.

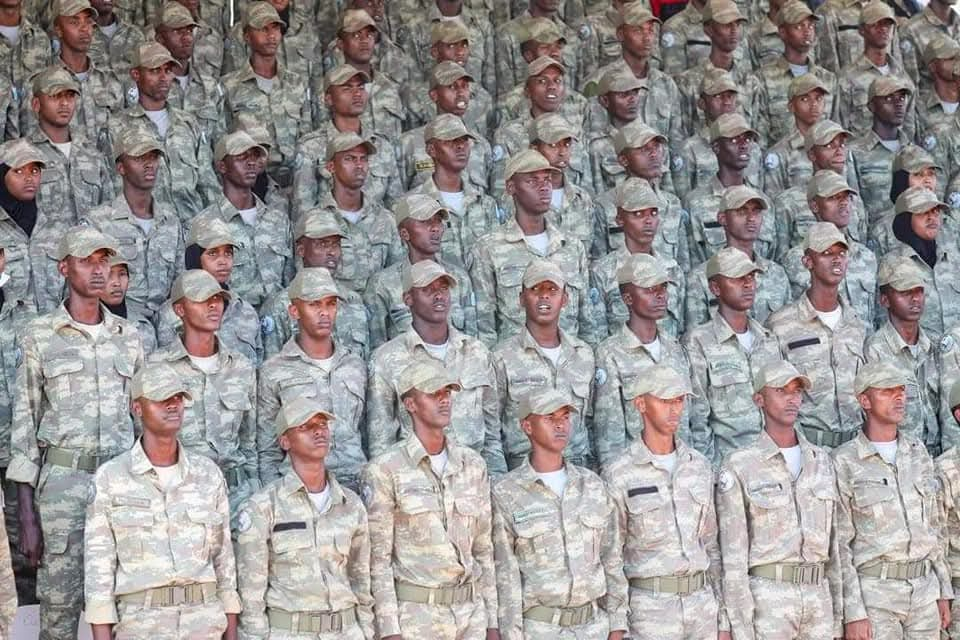
Gorgor Special Forces personnel in Turkish standard digital camouflage (TSK Kamuflaj) during a ceremony at the TURKSOM training base in Mogadishu.

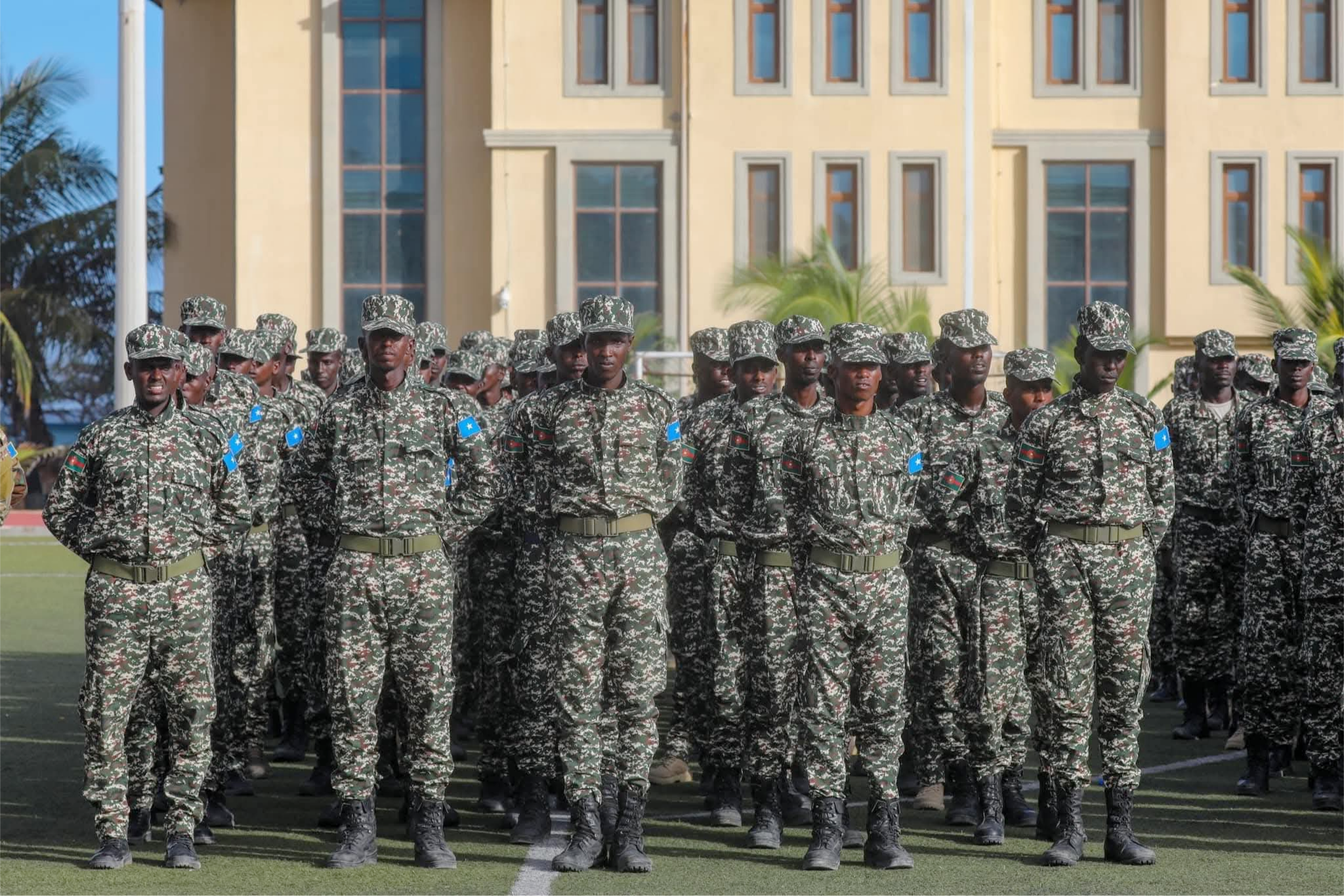
Earth-Tone Vegetation Camouflage of the Gorgor Special Forces.

== Training ==
Gorgor Special Forces undergo their initial training at the TURKSOM facility in Mogadishu. Initial training includes basic infantry and commando courses conducted at the TURKSOM base, followed by advanced special forces and commando training in Isparta, Türkiye.

Turkish Army instructors impart discipline, cohesion, working as a team, and weapons training. Training spans several months and is modelled on the Turkish Armed Forces' own special operations training regimen. Graduates of the program are expected to operate with high levels of tactical coordination and professionalism.

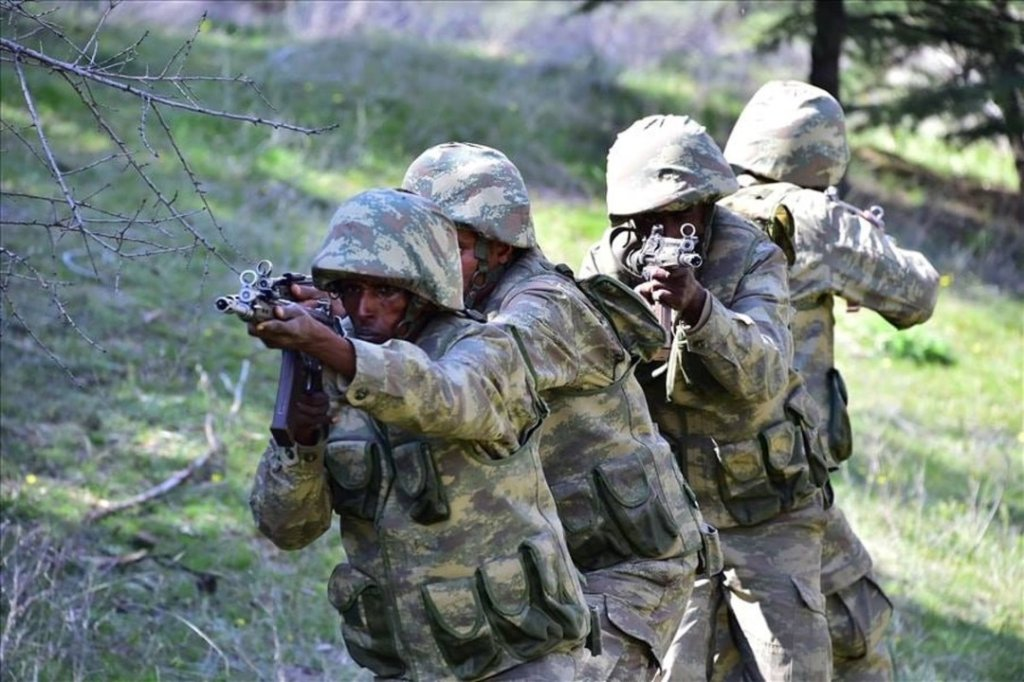
Gorgor special forces during training exercise in Turkiye.

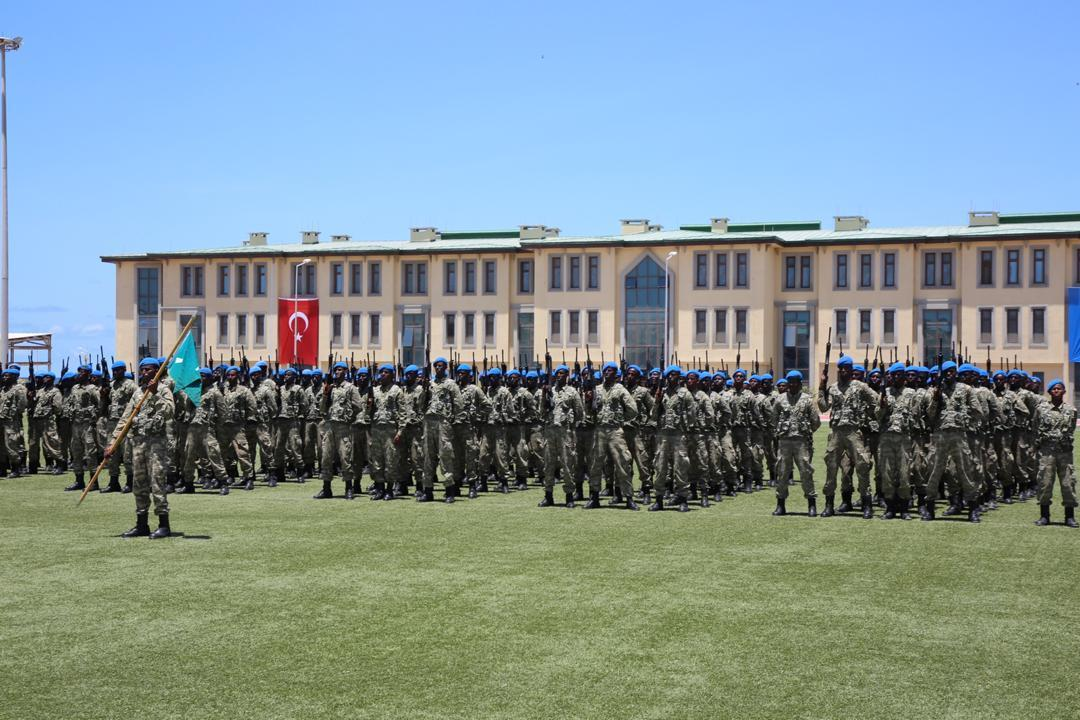
Gorgor troops at TURKSOM Military Academy in Mogadishu.
