= Bahdo =

Baxdo baxdo waa laas
- Town
- Interactive map of Baxdo
- Coordinates: 05°47′20″N 47°13′36″E
- Country: Somalia
- Region: Galguduud

Population
  - Total: 485,883
- Time zone: UTC+3 (EAT)

Bahdo (Somali: Baxdo) is a town in the Galguduud region of Galmudug state in central Somalia.
