= Masagaway District =

Masagaway Town
- Town
- Country: Somalia
- Region: Galguduud
- Time zone: UTC+3 (EAT)

Masagaway or Masagawayn Town is a small town in the central Galgaduud region of Somalia. It is 250 kilometers away from the Somali capital, Mogadishu.
