= Camp TURKSOM =

Somali–Turkish military base

- Xerada TURKSOM
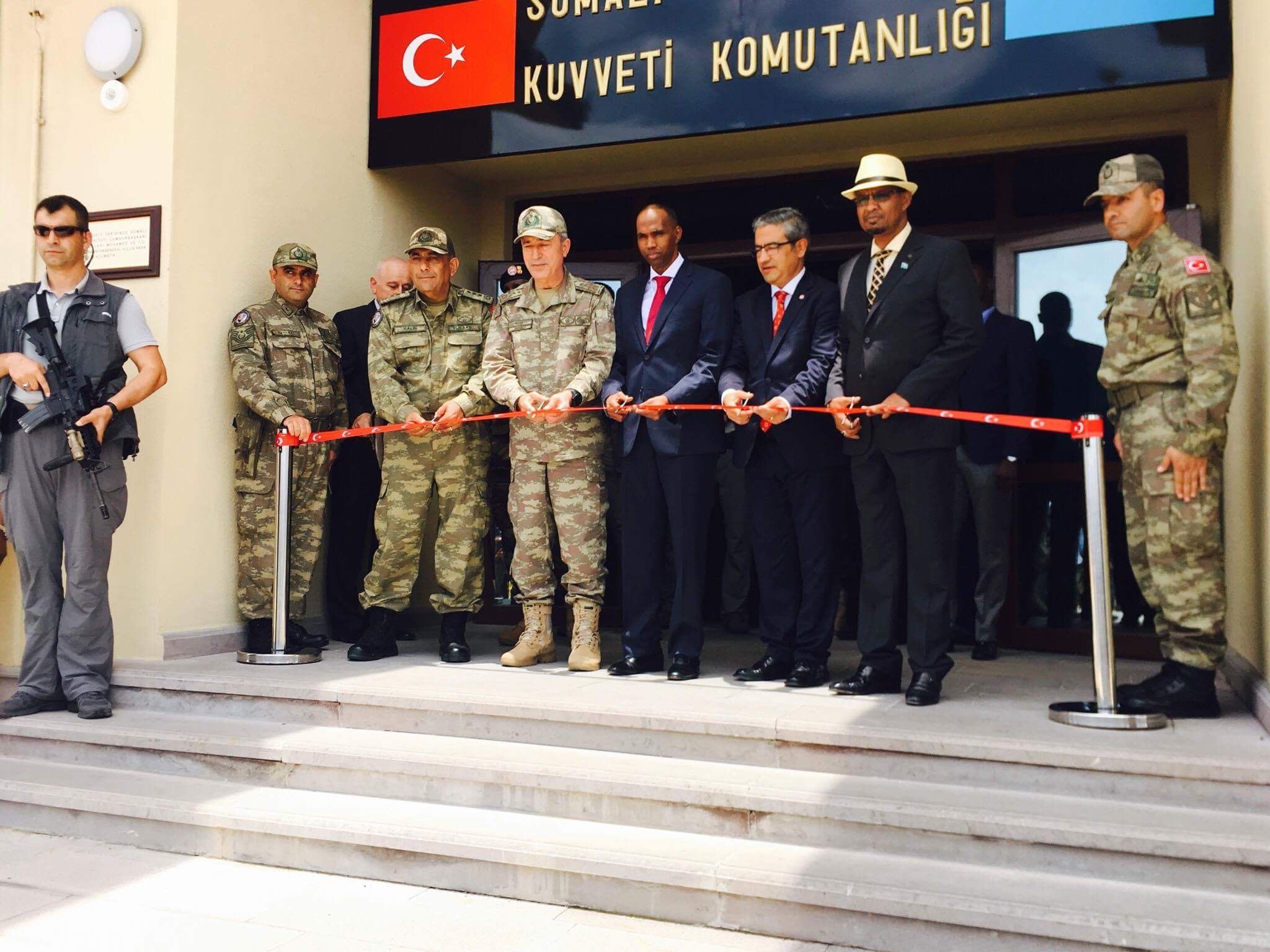
- Somali and Turkish delegation at Camp TURKSOM's opening, 2017

Site information
- Operator: Turkey

Location
- Coordinates: 1.996°N 45.268°E

Site history
- Built: September 2017
- In use: September 30, 2017 – present

Garrison information
- Current commander: Brigadier Mehmet Yasin Kalın
- Garrison: Somali-Turkish Task Force "African Eagle"

Camp TURKSOM (Somali: Xerada TURKSOM, Turkish: Somali Türk Görev Kuvveti Komutanlığı) is a Turkish military training establishment in Mogadishu, Somalia.

Since its inception, Camp TURKSOM serves as the main hub of the task force dubbed "African Eagle" in which Turkey aims to train and prepare the officers and NCOs of the Somali Armed Forces, thereby helping the Somali government in its efforts to build a military force that can sustain itself. The Turkish training is aimed at aiding the Somali soldiers in fighting against Al-Shabaab, which received criticism from African Union Mission to Somalia (AMISOM) for replicating its efforts in military training. The military base serves as Turkey's largest overseas military base. It covers a space of 400 hectares. Camp TURKSOM also has various political implications, as the military base, while countering Al Shabaab's foreign policy, politically serves Turkish interests and improves Turkey–Somalia relations. Criticisms have been posed to the base due to its centrality in Mogadishu leaving out other regions of Somalia such as Puntland and Somaliland.

== History ==
The base was formally opened on September 30, 2017, in a ceremony presided by Prime Minister Hassan Ali Khaire of Somalia and General Hulusi Akar, Chief of the General Staff of the Turkish Armed Forces. The construction of the base cost an estimated USD$50 million. The construction started in 2017 and took approximately two years.

On 18 April 2019, a graduation ceremony attended by top officials from both countries was held for the 1st infantry battalion.

As of June 2023, nine Gorgor (Eagle) infantry battalions have been trained in Somalia (TURKSOM base) and in Turkey. They first underwent basic training in the TURKSOM training center for 3 months and were then airlifted to a commando training center in Isparta, Turkey to undergo commando training in the final months of their training. The 10th and 11th battalions are expected to respectively finish training between January - June 2024.

Since its establishment, the military base has been carrying out training alongside AMISOM; by 2020 it is expected that AMISOM activities would decline in Somalia, if not be fully terminated. AMISOM’s efforts have mainly been targeted by Al-Shabaab due to the majority of its staff and soldiers being composed of non-Muslims. Camp TURKSOM has proposed an alternative to this situation by offering training conducted by Muslims as well as aiming to raise a national army for Somalia.

Turkey-Somalia Military/Security Agreements 2009-2019

Signature Date	Where	Agreement
17 April 2009	Ankara	Technical Cooperation Agreement
22 May 2010	Istanbul	Training, Technical and Scientific Cooperation in the Military Field (Framework)
13 April 2012	Ankara	Military Training Cooperation Agreement
25 January 2015	Mogadishu	Defense Industry Cooperation Agreement

== Function ==
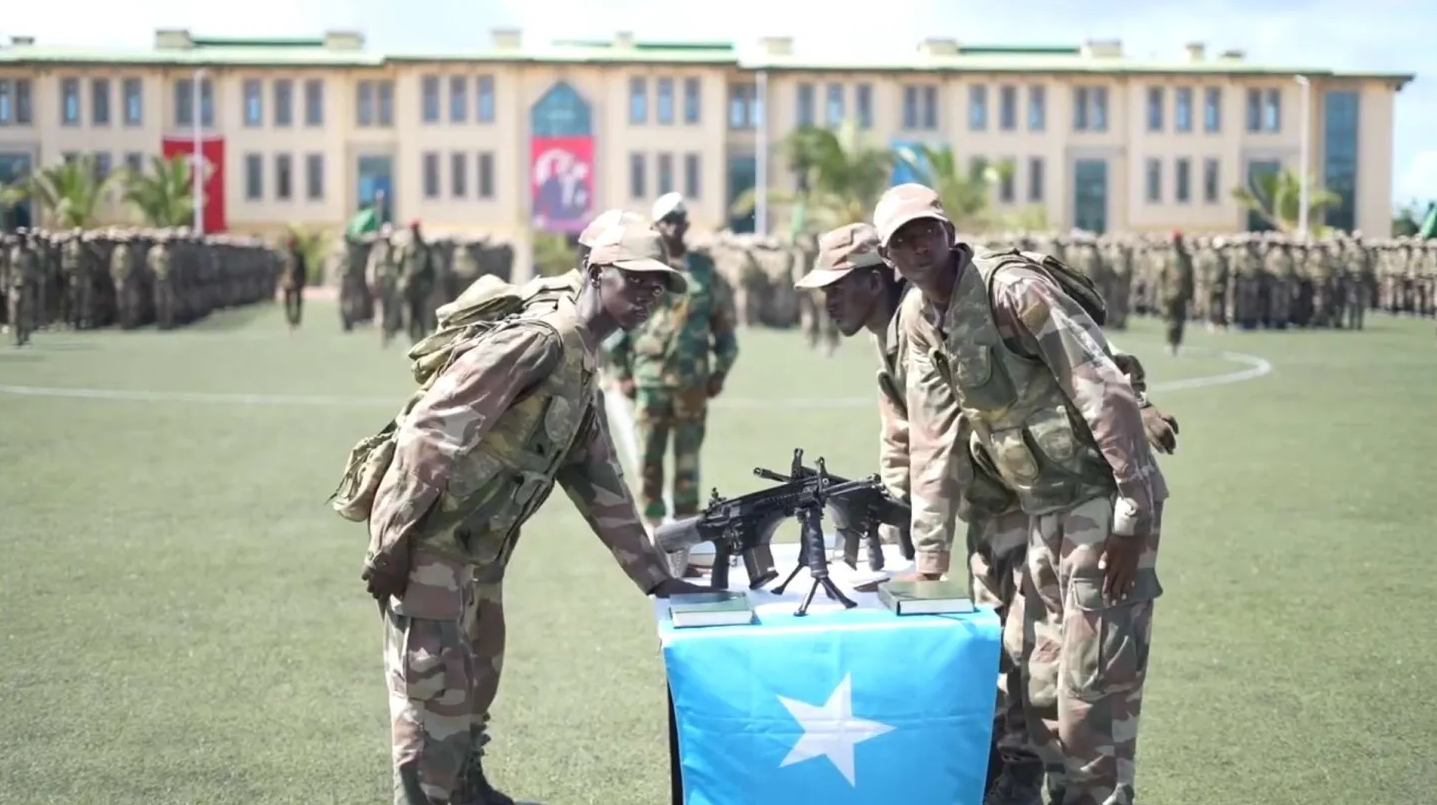
SNA troops troops of the 33rd battalion swearing in on the Quran at Camp TURKSOM, May 2026

Over 10,000 Somali soldiers are expected to be trained at the base, according to Turkish military officials. It can train and house approximately 1,000 soldiers at a time. The base is approximately four square kilometers in size. Since its construction, officers and NCOs of all branches of the Somali Armed Forces graduate on a routine basis. The officer's course and training is 2 years, and the NCO course and training is a year long; upon graduation the officer candidates are promoted to 2nd Lieutenant and the NCOs are promoted to the rank of Warrant Officer Class 3. Inside and on the university's grounds, there are classrooms, a conference room, an on-site training ground, football pitches, basketball courts, maritime simulation rooms, language labs, barbers and other amenities. More than 300 Turkish military personnel are currently stationed at the base. The camp has the capacity to accommodate approximately 1500 trainees at a time. As of 2023, nearly 5,000 Somali trainees have graduated from the military camp.

The candidates/graduates are known as the Gorgor commando brigade, are identifiable with the sky blue beret and the unique Turksom crest instead of the seal of the Armed Forces. As Somalia is under a UN embargo and cannot obtain military aircraft, the air force candidates are trained in Turkey instead.

== Political implications ==
=== Overarching goals ===
Camp TURKSOM has been one of the symbols Turkey has utilised to display its expanding economic and geopolitical presence in Eastern Africa. The camp has allowed Turkey to increasingly claim a role in ensuring security in Somalia through ways such as training soldiers in order to help resolve regional tensions and crises. The camp has been a part of the larger humanitarian and military assistance project of Turkey to Somalia. Major organisations such as the Turkish Cooperation and Coordination Agency (TİKA) and Turkish Red Crescent (Kızılay) have been providing development and medical assistance to Somalia as part of this greater Turkish involvement. Since 2011, activities of organisations such as these have already helped in alleviating the famine and improving public institutions in the country. The established military base only increases this existing involvement through offering a security dimension. Turkish involvement in Somalia has been referred to by the director of the Africa Research Center in Istanbul Aydin University as: "Turkey's efforts in Somalia are more likely to generate international coordination and cooperation, rather than creating conflict and turmoil... Many countries in Africa are aid-dependent, and American aid is an important part of their functioning as nation states, Turkey being one of the major donor countries to Somalia is going one step further by establishing a military capacity there. This is particularly important as development requires building up a military capacity that doesn't fully exist in Somalia." Another Africa expert, Hasan Ozturk, from a think-tank in Istanbul, BILGESAM, has commented on the role of the camp by stating: "For years, Turkey has been providing military training to officers of many African Union (AU) countries, including Somalia. It became very costly to host and train them each time in Turkey... Such training will also help Turkey's broader international trade priorities, as the training will involve anti-piracy efforts, to which Turkey has contributed in the past."

=== Regional rivalries in the Middle East ===
The Middle Eastern regional rivalry has extended to include efforts in obtaining hegemony in the Horn of Africa within the past years in order to extend political objectives beyond the borders of the region. Certain scholars have emphasised that the Turkish military presence in Somalia could pose a threat to countries such as the United Arab Emirates (UAE) and Saudi Arabia, countries which are within a regional rivalry against the current Turkey-Qatar alliance. There have been various efforts by both the Saudi Arabia-UAE alliance and Turkey-Qatar alliance to dominate the Horn of Africa in terms of bringing support into sectors such as that of security and development.

Alongside Turkey, the United Arab Emirates (UAE) also sent trainers to a military camp in Mogadishu in 2015. The UAE also agreed to build a military base in Somaliland in 2017 in order to safeguard the Berbera seaport. This seaport is managed by the Dubai World Port with a 30-year contract. The Berbera base was threatened by the Houthi rebels in Yemen due to the UAE involvement in the Yemeni conflict. The UAE withdrew after tensions surrounding the relations between Somalia and the UAE post the Gulf Cooperation Council crisis in 2018. In response to Turkey building up its relations with Africa Crown Prince Mohammad bin Salman of Saudi Arabia has mentioned that the actions of Turkey reflect Erdogan trying to build an "Ottoman caliphate" in the region.

=== Al Shabaab ===
Al Shabaab’s foreign policy focuses on preventing foreign presence within Somalia. This policy is evaluated by scholars as a challenge towards the current Turkish military engagement in the country. Turkey has previously been a target of Al Shabaab attacks in Somalia and some examples include the 2013 attack against a Turkish Mission in Somalia, 2016 attack in the Aden Abdulle International Airport against Daallo Airlines, 2017 attack on Mogadishu, and a Turkish citizen being threatened in 2019. Al Shabaab has negatively impacted Turkish-Somali relations by counteracting efforts in economic restructuring, aid and investment programs, as well as the creation of a new political system.

=== Turkish interests ===
The opening of the base is related to improving relations between Turkey and countries that are a part of the African continent. Statements made by officials suggest that Turkish interests in Somalia mainly revolve around the implementation of a development aid plan encompassing support for the country in its peace building objectives as well as within the public service sector. Moreover, some have argued that Somalia could be a location in which both the Turkish military and government could have an influence due to the political instability. Other ways in which the military engagement have been considered as beneficial to the Turkish state include those relating to the possible economic interests of Turkey with regards to the resources present in Somalia.Somalia also is situated by world trade routes as well as the Bab-El Mandeb strait, which is a strategic location. Other possible interests that have been put forth as part of scholarly debates include aiding Somalia in anti-piracy efforts, securing Turkish economic interests in the East Africa region, marketing of Turkish defence industry’s products and emerging as a stronger power within the Middle Eastern region and beyond. Turkish foreign policy objectives abroad have increasingly been focused on assisting the Turkish allies through both humanitarian and military means.

==== Turkish military ====
The Turkish Armed Forces has historically been involved in numerous coups in Turkish history, which were plotted with the goal of ensuring that the principles of secularism and democracy were preserved, reflecting its involvement in domestic politics. In recent years the Turkish military force also became a tool through which the Turkish foreign policy was implemented, which focused on becoming an independent major power in the world. In 2017, the Turkish Presidency of Defence Industries stated: ‘Development of defence industry exports and creating new international cooperation fields to increase its competitiveness in international markets’ as part of its strategic goals. The Turkish vision for 2023 includes opening new markets in both Asia and Africa in order to fulfil the country's objectives surrounding defence industry products. Such policies have been helping Turkey establish a defence industry that is not dependent on external powers.

When justifying Turkish involvement in Somalia and the establishment of Turkey's military base in Somalia, a Turkish think-tank called Ankara Centre for Crisis and Policy Research (ANKASAM) has referred to Turkey's historical role in guarding the Horn of Africa against Western enemies. An example to this has been given as the time when the Ottoman Sultan protected the region through sending naval forces into the region when the Portuguese attempted to invade the area. Referring back to this historical event, the current Turkish involvement has been described by this think-tank as: "Turkey is returning to the area to protect it from internal and external enemies, by launching a military training camp in Somalia's capital Mogadishu." Moreover, the analysis has continued with the following statement: "Turkey has no colonist policy in Africa... Its sole intention is to assist oppressed people in Africa in rebuilding their nations."

== Criticisms ==
There have been various criticisms targeting the Turkish military involvement in Somalia that have been introduced by different actors. These actors range from Al Shabaab to Western and Gulf countries. A mutual criticism that has been stated by all these actors targets the fact that the Turkish involvement in Somalia has been mainly focused in Mogadishu excluding regions such as Puntland and Somaliland. Turkish expansionism into the Horn of Africa, with increasing involvement in not only Somalia but also Djibouti and Sudan has been puzzling to political scientists as the Turkish state has been struggling due to its destabilised economy, domestic conflicts and deteriorating relations with traditional allies.
