= 2022 Somali presidential election =

- 15 May 2022

329 votes available 165 electoral votes needed to win
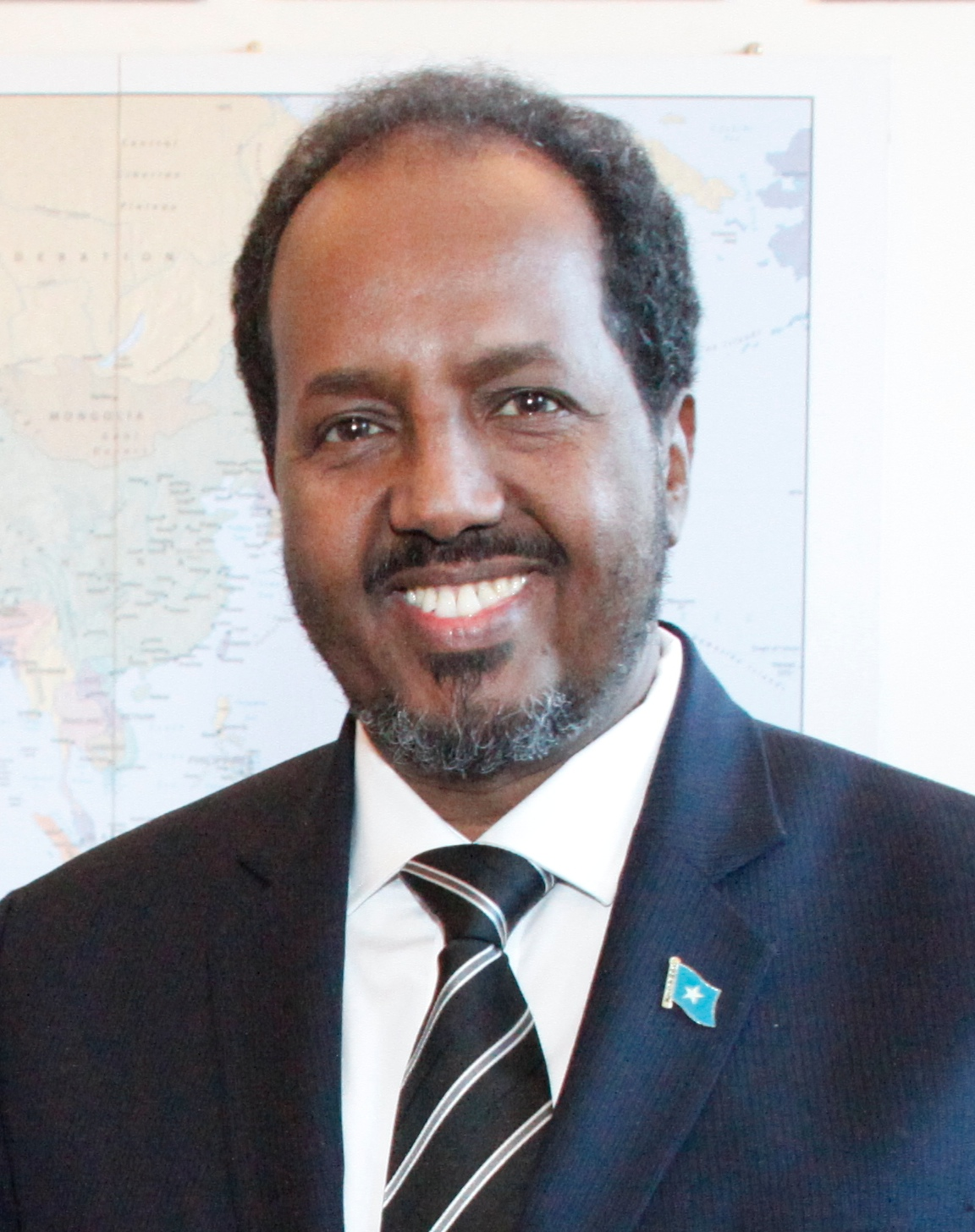

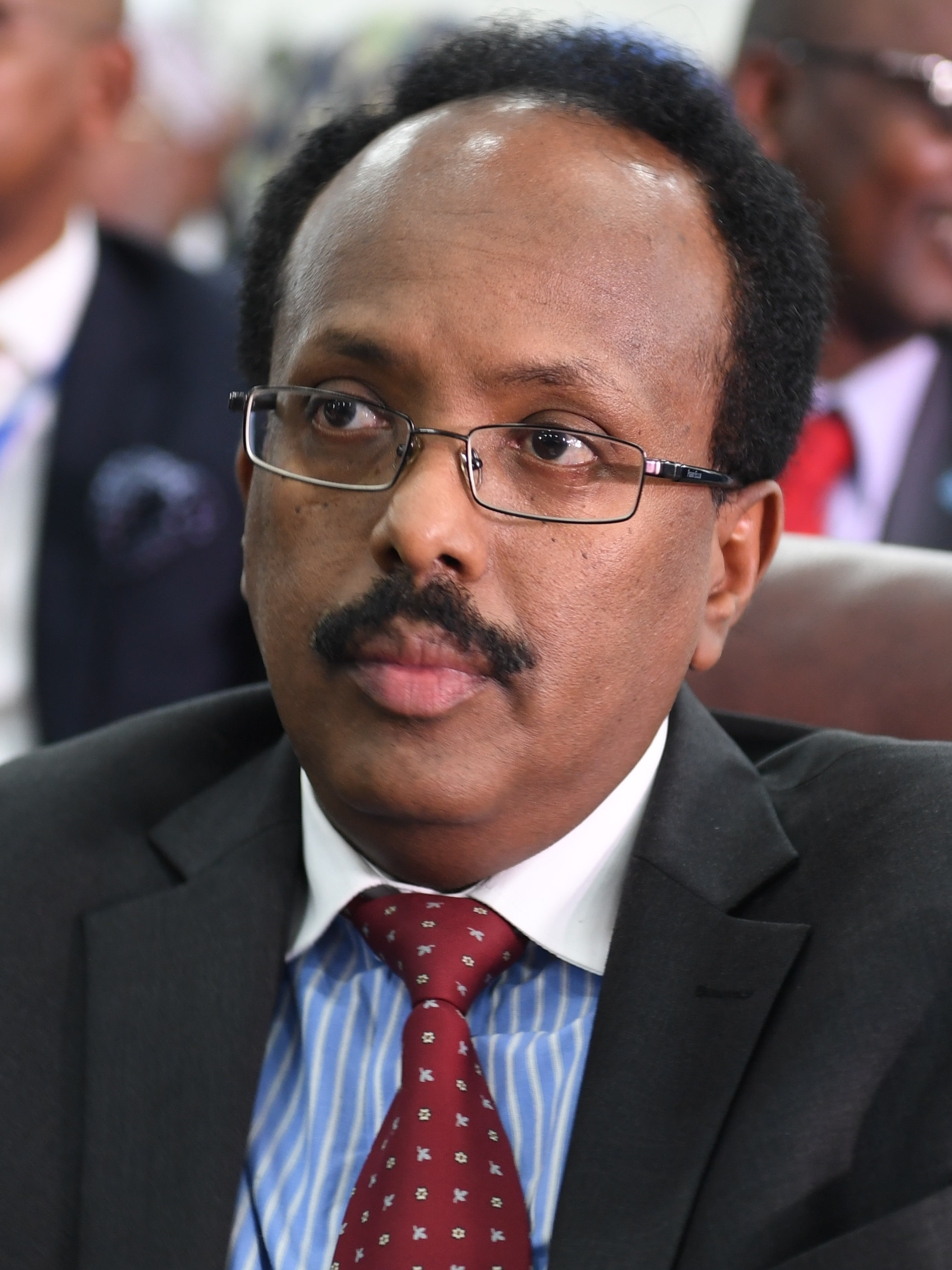
Nominee	Hassan Sheikh Mohamud	Mohamed Abdullahi Mohamed
Party	UPD	Tayo
Alliance	FNP
Electoral vote	214	110
Percentage	66.05%	33.95%
President before election
Mohamed Abdullahi Mohamed
Tayo
Elected President
Hassan Sheikh Mohamud
UPD

Presidential elections were held in Somalia in 15 May 2022. The election was held indirectly and after the elections for the House of the People, which began on 1 November 2021 and ended on 13 April 2022.

The elections were first scheduled to end on 24 December 2021. By 25 December, only 24 of 275 representatives had been elected and the ongoing political crisis further complicated matters. The incumbent president, Mohamed Abdullahi Mohamed, had been in office since the February 2017 election and his term expired on 8 February 2021; however, it was extended until after the elections would be completed. On 10 January 2022, Somali leaders announced they struck a deal to complete presidential and parliamentary elections by 25 February, after repeated delays that have threatened the stability of the country. The agreement was reached after several days of talks, hosted by Roble, with state leaders aimed at ending an impasse over the polls. On 25 February, the presidential election was further postponed to 15 March. On 15 March, the presidential election was again further postponed to 31 March in order to complete the election of the House of the People. On 13 April, the election of the House of the People was completed. The presidential elections date was thereafter set for 15 May. The International Monetary Fund threatened that Somalia would lose access to a three-year $400-million aid package if a new administration was not in place by the end of May.

After three rounds, involving 38 candidates, parliamentary officials counted more than 165 votes in favour of Hassan Sheikh Mohamud, more than the number required to defeat the incumbent president. He was declared president in a peaceful transition of power after the incumbent president conceded defeat and congratulated the victor. Celebratory gunfire rang out in parts of Mogadishu. The United Nations in Somalia welcomed the conclusion of the election, praising the “positive” nature of the electoral process and peaceful transfer of power.

== Background ==
The last direct multi-party election in Somalia was the 1969 parliamentary election, which was immediately followed by Siad Barre's military coup in October of the same year.

=== Single party state ===
Barre's Supreme Revolutionary Council transformed the country into a single-party Marxist-Leninist state. While a public direct election for President was held in December 1986, Somalia was a one-party state at the time; the Somali Revolutionary Socialist Party (SRSP) was the only legal political party, and incumbent Siad Barre was the only candidate. He was elected with no opponents, and fewer than 1,500 protest votes opposing his candidacy. In 1991, Somalia's central government collapsed due to his ousting, spurring a civil war that would last more than 25 years.

=== 2017 presidential election ===
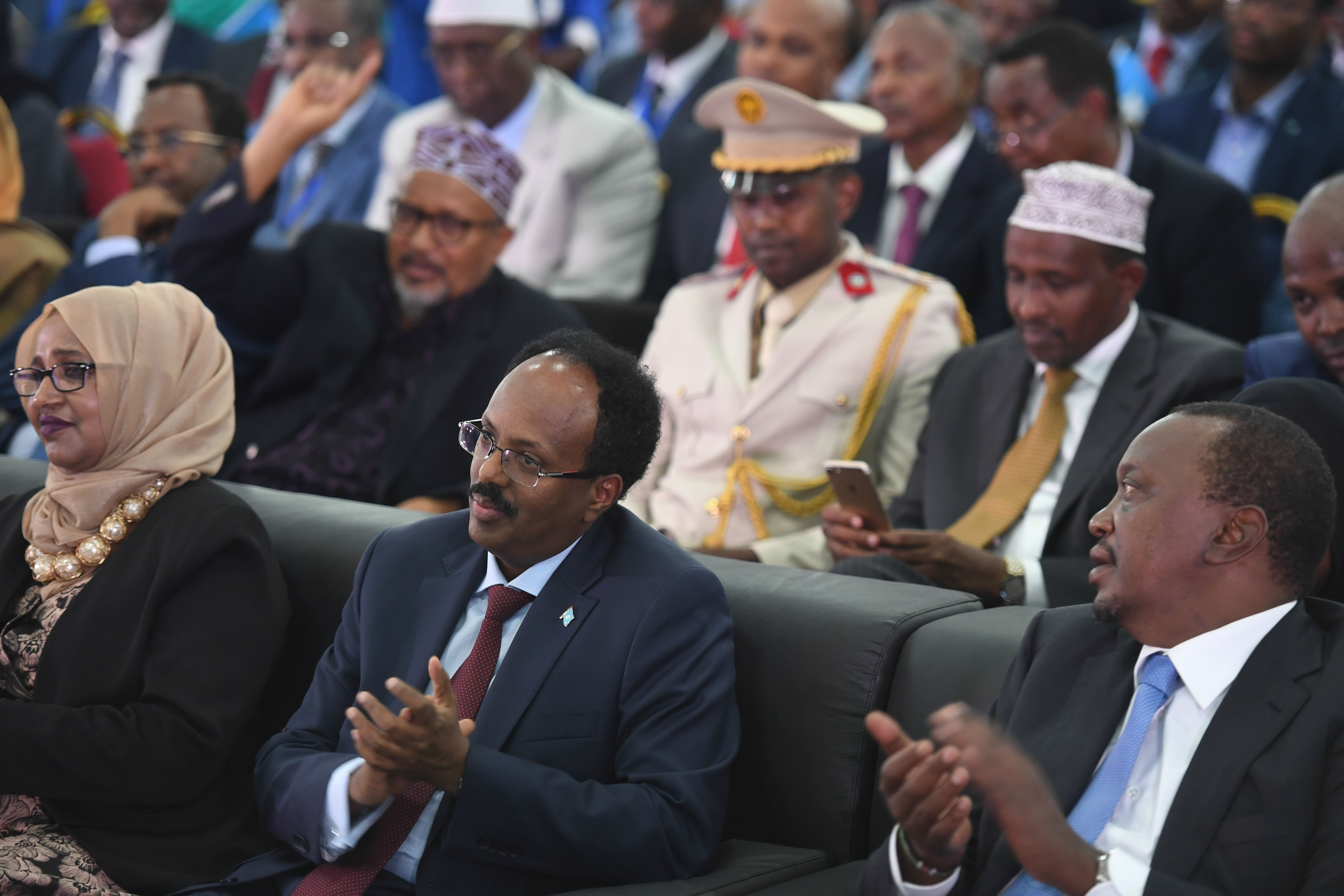
Mohamed during his inauguration ceremony in 2017

The 2017 presidential election (which was an indirect election by the Federal Parliament of Somalia) marked an "important milestone"; in a high-security hangar at the Aden Adde International Airport closed to the public, members of the Federal Parliament of Somalia elected Mohamed Abdullahi Mohamed the second president of the Federal Government of Somalia. However, the election was also noted as a "milestone of corruption" amid widespread reports of vote-buying; the New York Times described politicians as "peeling off wads of hundred dollar bills to buy votes", and estimated at least $20 million had changed hands during the parliamentary elections, which had directly determined the outcome of the presidential election.

== Preparations for presidential election ==
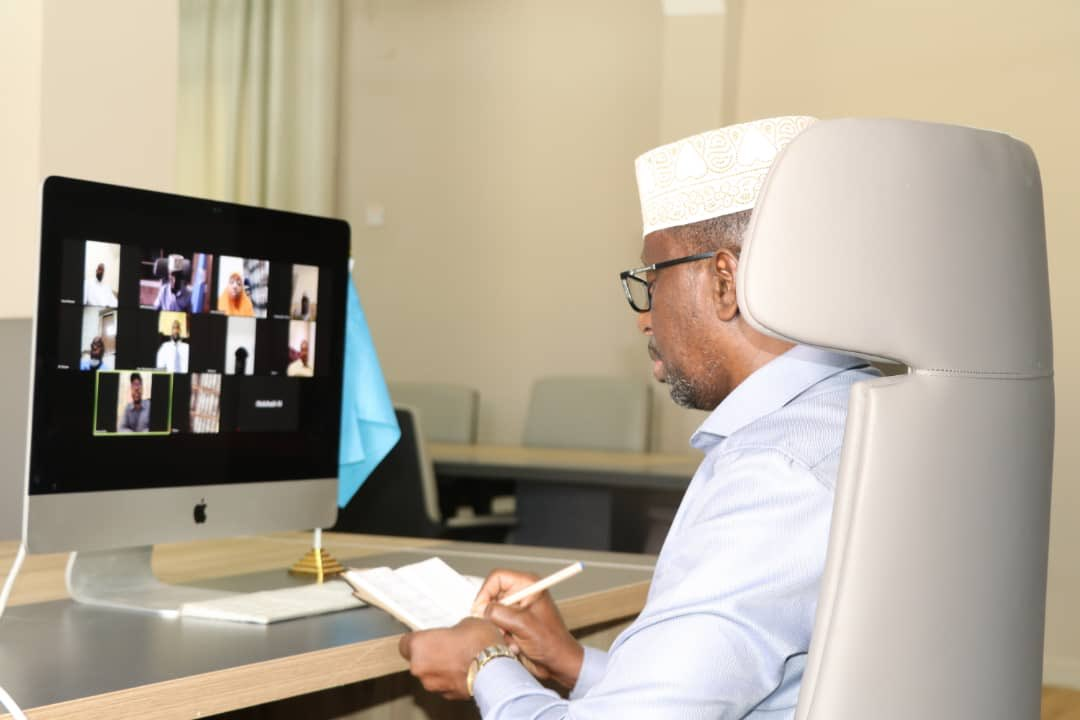
Sharif Sheikh Ahmed holding a video conference with the Forum for National Parties

Mohamed signed legislation in February 2020 giving all citizens the right to vote in parliamentary elections, which was an election campaign promise of his.

In May 2020, Prime Minister Hassan Ali Kheyre confirmed that the elections were to be held in early 2021 in a speech following a cabinet meeting; he was quoted as saying "Holding a timely election is more important than anything else at this time and it's one of the primary goals which the public entrusted us".

With Mohamed's presidential term due to end on 8 February 2021, in June 2020, the commissioner of the National Independent Electoral Commission (NIEC), Halima Ismail Ibrahim, said that the election could "not take place on time". Neither the deadline for parliamentary elections nor the deadline for presidential elections could be met, due to lack of funding and infrastructure for a universal vote. The Forum for National Parties (FNP), objected strongly to delays and called for the NIEC to resign; FNP member and former president Hassan Sheikh Mohamud said "We were not expecting them to come up with term extension, and to create political cloud [sic]". Ibrahim, however, refused to step down.

=== September 2020 agreement ===
In September, the plan for direct parliamentary elections was scrapped. On 17 September, Mohamed and five regional leaders agreed on a revised election procedure based on the 2016 Somali parliamentary election. In this procedure, clan elders verified by federal and state authorities would elect a parliament, whose members would then select a president. The Federal Government of Somalia agreed with member states to hold parliamentary elections on 1 December 2020.

=== Delays ===
As of November 2020, the presidential election was still expected to take place the following February, with "last-minute" organization having been delayed by "months of quarrels". On 24 November 2020 the First Deputy Speaker of the Upper House of Parliament, Abshir Mohamed Bukhari, said that Mohamed had proven unreliable in overseeing the upcoming parliamentary and presidential elections in the country and that Mohamed and his government could not be trusted with the election.

Following a six-day conference in Mogadishu, in November 2020, the Council of Presidential Candidates issued a statement calling for the dismissal of the electoral commissions and accusing Mohamed of being an impedance to the implementation of the election deal. In it they called on NISA chief Fahad Yasin to step down due to conflict of interest being that he is also the head of Mohamed's re-election campaign.

Jubaland President Ahmed Madobe accused Mohamed of violating the September election deal in which the Federal Government of Somalia had promised to withdraw the Somali National Army from Gedo region, handing administration to Kismayo.

Abdirashid Hashi, an analyst at the Heritage Institute for Policy Studies, said the Somali government needed to show stronger leadership.

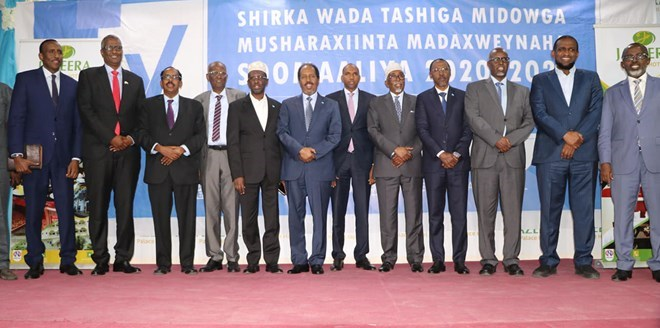
Council of Presidential Candidates of Somalia

The Council of Presidential Candidates accused Mohamed of "bypassing the electoral law by stacking the poll committee with his allies". Opposition candidates including Sharif Sheikh Ahmed and Hassan Sheikh Mohamud accused the Federal Government of Somalia of selecting National Intelligence and Security Agency members and civil servants loyal to Mohamed to the Electoral Dispute Resolution Committee. In December the Council of Presidential Candidates accused Mohamed of deployment of Somali Army troops to offices which host opposition parties. In Haantadheer security forces fired live rounds closing off major city roads, as hundreds of opposition supporters gathered.

The international community raised concerns about the political standoff, some view this election impasse as a new stumbling block for Somalia's road to democratisation.

In December 2020, hundreds of opposition supporters marched through the streets of Mogadishu denouncing Mohamed for delays in elections for both chambers of parliament. Mohamed was accused of wanting to subvert Somali nationhood to consolidate power. During the demonstrations were reports of clashes between gunmen protecting the protesters and security forces.

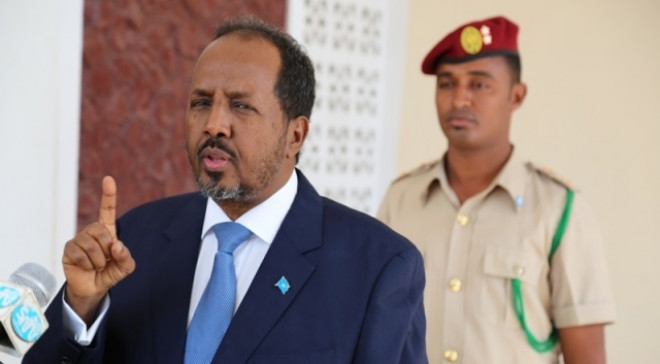
Hassan Sheikh Mohamud

Former president Hassan Sheikh Mohamud accused Mohamed of suppressing the Somali people after several protesters were arrested and at least four were wounded by Somali forces during anti-government protests, saying:

The rule of law must be protected and the government should always respect the rights and freedoms of the people. We shall not sit and watch someone violating the constitution he swore to protect. It's our duty to call for accountability.

— Hassan Sheikh Mohamud

After hearing that Turkey planned to send a shipment of weapons and ammunition, including 1,000 G3 assault rifles and 150,000 bullets to Harma'ad, a special unit in Somalia's police, between 16 and 18 Dec, opposition party leaders wrote to the Turkish ambassador in Somalia urging the Turkish government not to send the shipment, for fear that Mohamed would use it to 'hijack' the upcoming elections.

In January 2021 there have been demonstrations in Mogadishu with an increasing sense of frustration over the current election impasse being evident.

On 2 February 2021, Mohamed convened a meeting in Dusmareb with federal state leaders in an attempt to break the election deadlock.

=== January 2022 agreement ===
On 10 January 2022, Somali leaders announced they struck a deal to complete presidential and parliamentary elections by 25 February, after repeated delays that have threatened the stability of the country. The agreement was reached after several days of talks hosted by Roble with state leaders aimed at ending an impasse over the polls.

On 25 February, the presidential election was further postponed to 15 March.

On 15 March, the presidential election was again further postponed to 31 March in order to complete the election of House of the People.

On 13 April, the election of the House of the People was completed. The presidential election date was thereafter set for 15 May. The International Monetary Fund threatened that Somalia would lose access to a three-year $400-million aid package if a new administration was not in place by the end of May.

== Procedure ==
Per the agreements reached in 2020 and 2021, in this election, the President of Somalia was indirectly elected by members of both houses of the Federal Parliament of Somalia under the exhaustive ballot method.

== Candidates ==
Thirty-nine presidential candidates registered their candidacy during the registration period, which took place between 8 May and 10 May 2022. Presidential candidate Dahir Mohamud Gelle subsequently withdrew his candidacy before the election. Abdiqani Gelle, a senator from Puntland, was elected Chairman of the Joint Parliamentary Committee that conducted the country’s presidential election.

Portrait	Candidate	Experience	Candidacy registration date
	Abdikarim Hussein Guled	Former President of Galmudug (2015–2017)	8 May 2022
	Abdinur Sheikh Mohamed	Former Minister of Education, Higher Education and Culture (2010–2011)	8 May 2022
	Abdirahman Abdishakur Warsame	Former Minister of National Planning and International Cooperation (2009–2010)	8 May 2022
	Ahmed Duale Gelle	Former President of Galmudug (2017–2020)	9 May 2022
	Fawzia Yusuf H. Adam	Former Deputy Prime Minister and Minister of Foreign Affairs (2012–2014)	9 May 2022
	Hassan Ali Khaire	Former Prime Minister of Somalia (2017–2020)	8 May 2022
	Hassan Sheikh Mohamud	Former President of Somalia (2012–2017)	9 May 2022
	Mohamed Abdullahi Mohamed	Incumbent President of Somalia (2017–present)	9 May 2022
	Said Abdullahi Deni	Incumbent President of Puntland (2019–present)	10 May 2022
	Sharif Sheikh Ahmed	Former President of Somalia (2009–2012)	8 May 2022

== Results ==
The four candidates with the most votes in the first round advanced to the second round of elections. The top two candidates in the second round advanced to the third round of elections. After 3 rounds, involving 36 candidates, parliamentary officials counted more than 165 votes in favour of Hassan Sheikh Mohamud, more than the number required to defeat incumbent President Mohamed Abdullahi Mohamed. Hassan Sheikh Mohamud was declared president in a peaceful transition of power after incumbent President Mohamed conceded defeat and congratulated the victor. Celebratory gunfire rang out in parts of Mogadishu. The United Nations in Somalia welcomed the conclusion of the election, praising the “positive” nature of the electoral process and peaceful transfer of power.

Candidate	Party	First round		Second round		Third round	
Candidate	Party	Votes	%	Votes	%	Votes	%
Said Abdullahi Deni	Kaah	65	20.19	68	21.05		
Mohamed Abdullahi Mohamed	Tayo	59	18.32	83	25.70	110	33.95
Hassan Sheikh Mohamud	Union for Peace and Development Party	52	16.15	110	34.06	214	66.05
Hassan Ali Khaire	Independent	47	14.60	62	19.20		
Sharif Sheikh Ahmed	Alliance for the Re-liberation of Somalia	39	12.11				
Abdirahman Abdishakur Warsame	Wadajir Party	15	4.66				
Abdulkadir Osoble	Ilays Party	12	3.73				
Adow Ali Gaas		8	2.48				
28 other candidates		25	7.76				
Total		322	100.00	323	100.00	324	100.00
Valid votes		322	98.17	323	98.48	324	99.08
Invalid/blank votes		6	1.83	5	1.52	3	0.92
Total votes		328	100.00	328	100.00	327	100.00
Registered voters/turnout		329	99.70	329	99.70	329	99.39

== Incidents ==
=== Extended presidential term ===
On 8 February 2021, the Council of Presidential Candidates announced that they no longer recognise Mohamed as the President of Somalia since his term expired without any agreement on the path toward elections to replace him.

In a videoconference on 22 February 2020, James Swan the Special Representative and Head of the UN Assistance Mission in Somalia confirmed that the electoral implementation tensions had been compounded by questions over the legitimacy of Mohamed's mandate following the expiry of his constitutional term in office on 8 February, and that the growing political tensions threatened Somalia's state-building progress and even security. He encouraged Somalia's political leaders to "pull back from confrontation and avoid risky winner-take-all tactics".

=== Mogadishu mutiny ===
Soldiers - mainly from Hirshabelle - entered the Somali capital Mogadishu on 25 April 2021, after president Mohamed approved two years extension of his term in office. Rebels seized the northern part of the city clashing with pro-government forces in some neighbourhoods. Pro-government soldiers attacked homes of the former Somali president and opposition leaders. By the end of the day government forces withdrew towards Villa Somalia. On 6 May, the soldiers agreed to withdraw from Mogadishu after series of talks with the Prime Minister, held by the opposition. The police were set to take control of the city. On 8 May, roads were reopened and rebels withdrew from Mogadishu in vehicles towards Lower and Middle Shabelle.

=== Attacks on opposition candidates ===
On the night of 18 February 2021 there was an attack by government forces on the Ma'ida hotel in Mogadishu where opposition candidates including two former Presidents, Sheikh Sharif and Sheikh Hassan were staying.

On 19 February 2021, opposition candidates were again targeted by government forces, while taking part in a protest in Mogadishu over the election delay, when shells fired at them landed inside Mogadishu Airport. Another opposition candidate, former prime minister Hassan Ali Khaire said that he and several other presidential candidates, lawmakers, other officials and civilians had survived an "assassination attempt" at the protest.

Sheikh Hassan accused Mohamed of a coup saying;

What transpired in Mogadishu last night and today is a coup orchastrated by the former president (Mohamed) who turned down calls to lead the country to elections. The Federal Parliament and the militia commanders who have backed him in the coup will be held accountable for their actions and brought to justice.

— Hassan Sheikh Mohamud

The southern Somali state of Jubaland, which is led by President Ahmed Madobe, issued a statement condemning the violence, "Jubaland condemns the violence meted out by the Somali government against unarmed civilians and the illegal use of the armed forces. The heinous act in Mogadishu by Somali troops is a blow to efforts to resolve the current political crises in the country".

The United Arab Emirates expressed grave concern over the deteriorating situation in Somalia, calling upon the interim government of Mohamed and all parties, "to demonstrate the highest levels of restraint in order to achieve Somalia's aspirations to build a secure and stable future for all", and expressed its hope that stability would prevail in Somalia, "in a way that preserves its national sovereignty and fulfills the aspirations of its brotherly people".

=== Arbitrary arrests and persecution of journalists ===
In February 2021 there were arbitrary arrest of journalists following protests in Mogadishu over delays in elections. Journalists were threatened and intimidated at gunpoint, denied access and their equipment was confiscated by government forces.

In March 2021, Amnesty International called on the Somali authorities to bring an end to the arbitrary arrest and persecution of journalists in Puntland, prior to the presidential and parliamentary elections:

The spike in arrests of journalists in Puntland shows an escalating crackdown on media freedom. These arrests will have a chilling effect on the work of journalists before, during and after the election. Authorities must bring this practice to an end, and respect, protect, promote and fulfil the human rights of everyone and media freedom.

— Deprose Muchena, Amnesty International's Director for East and Southern Africa
