= List of political parties in Somalia =

This article lists political parties in Somalia. In 2017 an independent electoral commission was inaugurated with a mandate to oversee the process of registration of political parties in the country, according to Article 47 of the Federal Provisional Constitution which provides for an electoral system. The system guarantees participation of every individual who subscribes to a political party. NIEC has registered over 100 political parties, most of which still operate from outside the country for security reasons. For this reason, political parties still remain relatively weak in the country.

In October 2019 six parties joined to form the Forum for National Parties, an alliance founded by former president Sharif Sheikh Ahmed which has come together to address the political and security issues faced by Somalia. The alliance includes Himilo Qaran party, led by former President Sharif Sheikh Ahmed, and Peace and Development Party led by current President Hassan Sheikh Mohamud. Other key leaders joining the coalition include Ilays party leader Abdulkadir Osoble, former South West President Sharif Hassan and former defense minister Mohamed Abdi, the first interim president of Azania.

== Overview and background ==
During the civilian administration which existed prior to the seizure of power by the Supreme Revolutionary Council (SRC) in 1969, there were a number of local political parties. Most notable of these early institutions was the Somali Youth League, the nation's first political organization. Upon assuming office, the SRC (led by Siad Barre) outlawed all extant political parties, and established the Somali Revolutionary Socialist Party to advocate a form of scientific socialism inspired by 1960s Soviet Union. Following the outbreak of the civil war in 1991 that saw the ouster of the Barre regime, many of the few remaining political parties gave way to autonomous or semi-autonomous regional states, or fragmented into feuding militia groups. After several unsuccessful national reconciliation efforts, a Transitional Federal Government (TFG) was formed in 2000 with a five-year mandate leading toward the establishment of a new constitution and a transition to a representative government. The Federal Government of Somalia was established on August 20, 2012, concurrent with the end of the TFG's interim mandate. It represents the first permanent central government in the country since the start of the civil war.

On 29 May 2017, the Somali Political Parties Registration Office was established in Mogadishu. The office's job is to bring the country to the party system and remove it from the current 4.5 clan power-sharing system. On 3 December 2017, the Independent Electoral Commission began registering political parties in Somalia for the first time in 50 years.

== Parties ==
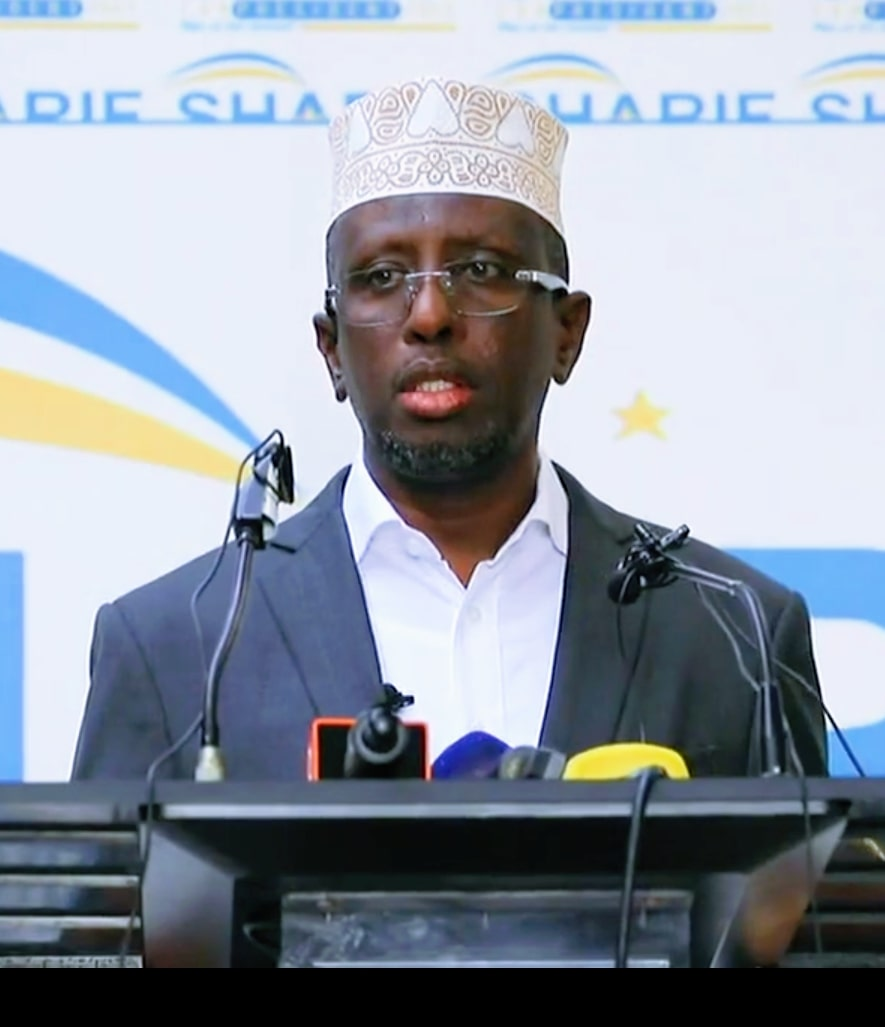
7th President of Somalia Sharif Sheikh Ahmed, founder and leader of Himilo Qaran

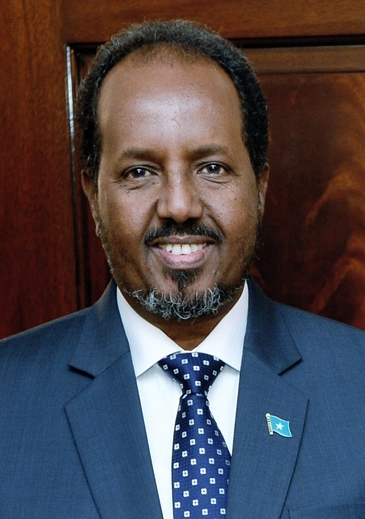
8th and 10th President of Somalia Hassan Sheikh Mohamud, founder and chairman of the Peace and Development Party

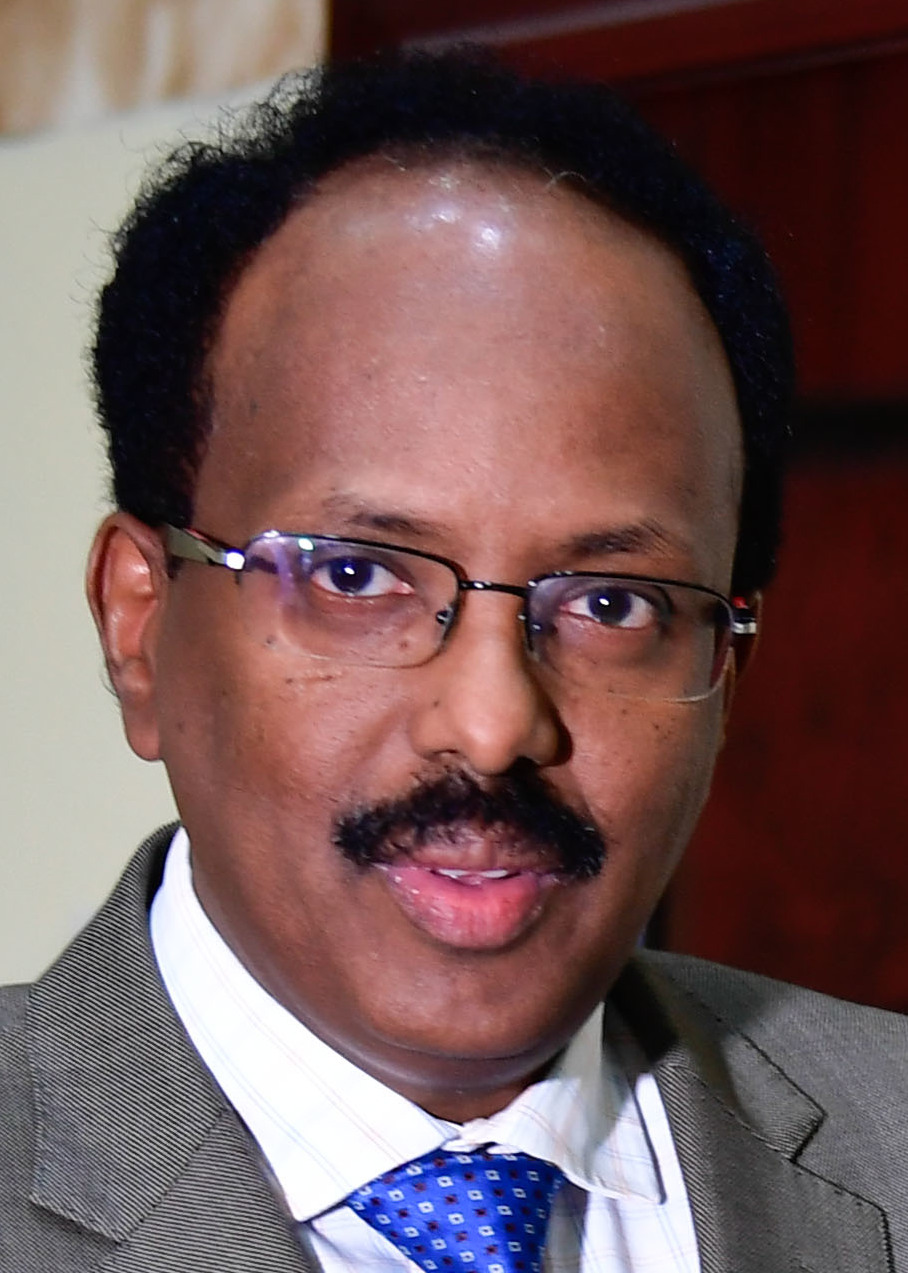
9th President of Somalia Mohamed Abdullahi Mohamed, founder and Secretary-General of Tayo

=== Current ===
As of 2023, the National Independent Electoral Commission (NIEC) has registered a total of 110 parties. Some of the notable ones include

Party	Ideology	Nominee
CAHDI Party	Federalism; Liberalism	Prof.Abdirahman Abdiqani Ibrahim
Himilo Qaran	Islamic democracy	2025 nominee Sh Sharif
Tawfiq	Reformism	2025 nominee Sh Shakir
Tayo	Liberalism; Social liberalism Economic liberalism Civic nationalism	2025 nominee Farmajo
Union for Peace and Development Party	Social conservatism Somali nationalism Islamic democracy	
Nagaad Party		2025 nominee Abdi Farah
Gobanimo		

=== Former ===
- Somali Youth League (nationalist, 1943–1969)
- Somali Revolutionary Socialist Party (communist, 1976–1991)
- United Somali Congress (anti-communist, 1987–2000)
- Islamic Courts Union (Islamist, 2000–2007)
- Alliance for the Re-liberation of Somalia (Islamist, 2007–2009)
- Peace and Development Party (Islamist, 2011–2018)

=== Puntland ===
As of May 2020, there are 17 registered political parties in Puntland.

Current parties of Puntland
Name	Ideology	Note
Horseed	Conservatism	First political party in Puntland
Justice and Equality	Islamic democracy Social conservatism	New political organisation
Kaah	Democracy	Ruling party
Mideeye	Democracy	Unity party
Ururka Dadka Puntland	Democracy	Previously the ruling party
(Sinnaan iyo Caddaalad) Sincad	Democracy	New political party

=== Somaliland (disputed entity) ===
Current parties of Somaliland
Name	Ideology	Seats
For Justice and Development	Social democracy	21 / 82
Kulmiye	Social liberalism	30 / 82
Waddani	Nationalism; Populism; Islamic democracy	31 / 82

== See also ==
- Politics of Somalia
- Lists of political parties
