= Cosmopolitan Democratic Party =

Somali political party

- Chairperson: Samiya Lerew
- Secretary-General: Falastin Hussein
- Founder: Yarow Sharif Aden
- Founded: 6 May 2015
- Ideology: Liberalism
- Colors: Blue, White, and Red

Website
- https://xisbigadanwadaag.com/

Cosmopolitan Democratic Party (Somali: Xisbiga Dimoqoraadiga Danwadaag) is a Somali political party. Founded on 6 May 2015.

== Leadership ==
- The chairperson is Samiya Lerew. Her grandfather was a politician. Her mother was a Somali celebrity, a singer and broadcaster with Radio Mogadishu, and her father an Eritrean lawyer. In 1982, Samiya came to the UK to study English and train in secretarial and administrative studies.
- The Secretary-General is Falastin Hussein.
- The Vice President is Salah Mikomwa.
- Ibrahim Addo is responsible for Foreign Relations.
- Sadat Geesh is responsible for Press and Youth Engagement.
- Osman Mohando is responsible for Social and Family Malware.
- Hodan Abdi is responsible for Finance.

== Ideology ==
According to the Founder of Party, Yarow Sharif Aden, the Constitution of Party is based on the values of liberalism, every Somali should be counted as and valued as a citizen of the country and should have equal opportunities in every aspect of the society, and every individual's right should be protected and must not be sacrificed in favour of a group.

== Party objectives ==
The main goal of the party is to give left behind communities a viable political voice, advocating for equal opportunity, economic inclusivity, education opportunities for the youth and homestead resettlement, and to unite Somalis for a better future.

The party endeavor to encourage policies that promote inclusivity, citizenship based society, progressive human development and where necessary implement affirmative action to allow temporary measures in order to compensate for the damages caused by 4.5 system inequalities. The party also will endeavor to encourage constituencies to elect their own party representative for real democracy to take root. It means that constituents won't be allowed to elect their representatives on the based on their clan affiliation, religion or race.

== See also ==
- Political parties in Somalia
