= Haldoor Party =

Political party in Somalia

- Chairperson: Mohamed Sheikh Hassan Faqih
- General Secretary: Qeys Ali Omar
- First Secretary: Abdirahman Dini (Secretary of Information)
- Founded: 2018
- Headquarters: Mogadishu
- Ideology: Big tent
- Political position: Centre
- Colors: Sky blue

Haldoor Party (Somali: Xisbiga Haldoor) is a Somali political party that support former president of Somalia Mohamed Abdullahi Mohamed. It supports the strengthening of the government of Somalia and the development of constructive policies. In 2019 it was registered as a political party.

== See also ==
- Political parties in Somalia
