= Qaransoor Party =

Congress political party

Qaransoor Party Xisbiga Qaransoor
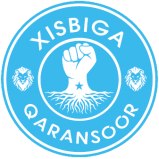
- Abbreviation: Q
- Chairperson: Abdijabaar Sheikh Ahmed
- General Secretary: Mohamed Aden Afrah
- Founded: 15 March 2020
- Headquarters: Mogadishu
- Ideology: Somali nationalism Reformism

Website
- qaransoor.so

The Qaransoor Party (Somali: Xisbiga Qaransoor, Arabic: حزب القرنصور), colloquially referred to as Q, is a political party established in Somalia on March 15, 2020. The party articulates its primary aim as the advocacy for political reform within Somalia, designed to advance national interests and uphold the country's unity and sovereignty.

== Background and Party's vision ==
The Qaransoor Party received its party certificate from Independent National Electoral Commission (NIEC) chairperson Marbo Halima Ismail Ibrahim at NIEC headquarters in Mogadishu on October 7, 2020. Mohamed Aden Afrah (Somali: Maxamed Aadan ‘Afrax) is the current general secretary and Abdijabar Sheikh Ahmed Jibril (Somali: Cabdijabaar Sheekh Axmed Jibriil) is the current chairman.

Vision

The party's vision is a nation capable of self-sufficiency in both its economy and security, the development of the intelligence and military sectors, fighting against extremism, and the building of an education system based on academic and religious qualifications.

== Constitution ==
The party has a written constitution. A key part of the constitution is that the nation must participate in the restoration of Somali statehood, as well as political and social reform. According to the constitution, members must be healthy Somalis who fulfill the requirements of the charter. Membership cannot be handed down to another person. The full list of members is currently not available to the public.

== See also ==
- Political parties in Somalia
