= 2021–2022 Somali parliamentary election =

- Senate
- 29 July–13 November 2021
- 54 seats in the Senate of Somalia
- House of the People
- 1 November 2021–31 March 2022
- 275 seats in the House of the People

In 2021, elections for the Federal Parliament and subsequently the President of Somalia were due to take place, following a national agreement to reschedule them from the previous year due to the COVID-19 pandemic in the country.

The elections for the Senate of the Federal Parliament began on 29 July and concluded on 13 November.

The elections for the House of People began on 1 November 2021 and concluded on 31 March 2022. They were initially scheduled to end on 24 December 2021, however, by 25 December, only 24 of 275 representatives had been elected and the ongoing political crisis further complicated matters. The incumbent president, Mohamed Abdullahi Mohamed, has been in office since the February 2017 election and his term expired on 8 February 2021; however, it was extended until after the parliamentary elections would be completed. On 10 January 2022, Somali leaders announced they struck a deal to complete the elections for the House of the People by 25 February, after repeated delays that have threatened the stability of the country. The agreement was reached after several days of talks, hosted by Prime Minister Mohamed Hussein Roble, with state leaders aimed at ending an impasse over the polls. On 25 February 2022, the election deadline was further postponed to 15 March. On 15 March, the deadline was again further postponed to 31 March. The election was completed on 31 March and the results were announced on 1 April.

The presidential elections date was thereafter set for 15 May. The president was indirectly elected by the members of both houses of the Federal Parliament. The International Monetary Fund threatened Somalia would lose access to a three-year $400-million aid package, if a new administration was not in place by the end of May. After three rounds, involving 36 candidates, parliamentary officials counted more than 165 votes in favour of Hassan Sheikh Mohamud, more than the number required to defeat the incumbent president. He was declared president in a peaceful transition of power after the incumbent president conceded defeat and congratulated the victor.

== Background ==
In December 2019, the International Partners released a joint press statement urging that the future election model of Somalia should:

- Respect the Constitution;
- Ensure that the federal elections are held on time in late 2020/early 2021, without extension of the terms of the Executive or Parliament;
- Ensure fair representation of all Somali communities;
- Afford the Somali people the opportunity to directly elect their representatives through "one person, one vote";
- Include a role for political parties in the elections;
- Guarantee a minimum of 30 per cent representation for women in the Federal Parliament;
- Enable the broadest possible participation including of internally displaced persons;
- Enjoy wide support among all Somali stakeholders;
- Be capable of being implemented effectively and securely and of attracting sufficient funding through application of these principles;
- Result in peaceful election of leaders who have broad legitimacy, and
- Respect the mandate of the National Independent Electoral Commission.

International partners include: African Union Mission in Somalia (AMISOM), Canada, Denmark, Ethiopia, European Union, Finland, France, Germany, Intergovernmental Authority on Development (IGAD), Italy, Kenya, Norway, Sweden, Switzerland, United Kingdom, United Nations and United States.

== Preparations ==
In August 2020, after a summit in Dhusamareb, attended by the President of Somalia, three state leaders and the mayor of Mogadishu, an election model based on constituency caucuses was agreed on. As part of the agreement, each caucus of 303 delegates will elect an MP who will get a seat in parliament, and the MPs will then elect a president. Puntland and Jubaland leaders were not part of the deal that was reached in Dhusamareb as they did not attend the summit. The deal still has to be approved by the Lower House (House of the People) of Parliament, however.

In September 2020 the Federal Government of Somalia agreed with member states to hold parliamentary elections on 1 December 2020. President Mohamed and the Five Federal Members States presidents, Said Abdullahi Dani of Puntland, Ahmed Abdi Karie of Galmudug, Mohamed Abdi Ware of Hirshabelle, Abdiaziz Laftagareen of South West and Ahmed Madobe of Jubbaland plus Omar Mohamud Mohamed, the Mayor of Mogadishu agreed on October 1 to an indirect election model, allowing 101 delegates from the clans to elect members of the parliament. The agreed timeline showed that 54 senators of the Upper House and 275 MPs of the Lower House will be elected before end of 2020. A joint session of the bicameral parliament is scheduled to elect president.

In November 2020 the Council of Presidential Candidates accused President Mohamed of "bypassing the electoral law by stacking the poll committee with his allies".

Opposition candidates including Sharif Sheikh Ahmed and Hassan Sheikh Mohamud accused the Federal Government of Somalia of selecting National Intelligence and Security Agency members and civil servants loyal to the president to the Electoral Dispute Resolution Committee. The international community raised concerns about the political standoff. Abdirashid Hashi, an analyst at the Heritage Institute for Policy Studies, said the Somali government needed to show stronger leadership.

In November 2020 Jubaland President Ahmed Madobe accused President Mohamed of violating the September election deal in which the Federal Government of Somalia had promised to withdraw Somali National Army from Gedo region, handing administration to Kismayo.

In December 2020 opposition supporters marched and demonstrated in Mogadishu denouncing President Mohamed or delays in elections for both chambers of parliament. After hearing that Turkey planned to send a shipment of weapons and ammunition, including 1,000 G3 assault rifles and 150,000 bullets to Harma’ad, a special unit in Somalia's police, between December 16 and 18, opposition party leaders wrote to the Turkish ambassador in Somalia urging the Turkish government to cancel the shipment, fearing that Mohamed would use it to 'hijack' the upcoming elections.

On 26 December 2020 several women were shot at by NISA and police, arrested at gunpoint and detained during a peaceful anti-government protest in Mogadishu. In response the Union of Presidential Candidates demanded an apology from President Mohamed and ask for clarification of the governments position on freedom of assembly.

=== Constitutional crisis and violence ===
Somalia experienced a constitutional crisis when the election date of February 8, 2021 lapsed without a vote occurring. Negotiations between the incumbent president Farmaajo and opposition party leaders failed to result in an agreement.

Gunfire and mortar shelling occurred in central Mogadishu on 17 February in response to an opposition march in the city. Former Presidents Sharif Sheikh Ahmed and Hassan Sheikh Mohamud claimed their hotel was attacked on the eve of the planned protest ordered by President Mohamed Abdullahi Mohamed.

==== Restaurant bombing ====
On 19 February 2022, an al-Shabaab member blew himself up at a restaurant in Beledweyne, killing 14 people, including a candidate in the parliamentary vote.

== Parliamentary elections ==
Elections to the Federal Parliament began in mid-to-late 2021, following agreements in May and June of the same year. The Federal Electoral Implementation Team (FEIT) announced election results of both houses of the Federal Parliament on 31 March 2022, with 26 seats in the House of the People remained unfilled and four seats suspended. The FEIT began issuing official certificates to members of Federal Parliament on 2 April.

=== Senate ===
The Federal States began their election of senators on 29 July and concluded on 13 November 2021, with Galmadug state returning its two senators. Victory was given to nabad iyo nolal (51.852%) 28/54 seats. The resulting membership of the Senate fell short of the 30% quota for women, only 24% (13 out of 54) of seats in the Senate are held by women.

=== House of the People ===
Elections to the lower house of the Federal Parliament were to begin in September 2021, with the intent to conclude them in October, although this deadline was passed. The elections began on 1 November and were expected to conclude on 24 December 2021. However, by 25 December only 24 of 275 representatives had been elected and the ongoing political crisis further complicated matters.

On 10 January 2022, Somali leaders announced they struck a deal to complete the parliamentary elections by 25 February, after repeated delays that have threatened the stability of the country. The agreement was reached after several days of talks, hosted by Prime Minister Roble, with state leaders aimed at ending an impasse over the polls. On 25 February 2022, the completion of the election was further postponed to 15 March. On 15 March, the end of the election was again further postponed to 31 March. The election was completed on 31 March and the results were announced on 1 April. The election was won by the Nabad iyo Nolal party with 52% (143 seats).

== See also ==
- 2022 Somali presidential election
- Elections in Somalia
