= Peace and Development Party =

Political party in Somalia

Peace and Development Party Xisbiga Nabadda Iyo Horumarka
- Founder: Hassan Sheikh Mohamud
- Founded: 2011
- Dissolved: 4 October 2018
- Succeeded by: Union for Peace and Development Party
- Headquarters: Mogadishu
- Ideology: Islamism; Islamic democracy Social conservatism Economic liberalism

Website
- pdp.so

The Peace and Development Party (PDP, Somali: Xisbiga Nabadda Iyo Horumarka) is a political party in Somalia. It was established in April 2011 by Hassan Sheikh Mohamud, the President of Somalia from 2012 to 2017. PDP members unanimously elected him as the party's Chairman in April 2011, with a mandate to serve as leader for the next three years. However, Mahmoud resigned from the party on 22 December 2016, launching the similarly named Union for Peace and Development Party. The party's leadership also has ties with Al-Islah, Somalia's branch of the Muslim Brotherhood.

The party claims conservative and Islamist views.

In October 2019, the PDP joined the Forum for National Parties, an alliance of Somali political parties which have agreed to work together to resolve Somalia's political and security issues.

== See also ==
- Political parties in Somalia
