= Forum for National Parties =

Somalian political party

Forum for National Parties Madasha Xisbiyada Qaran
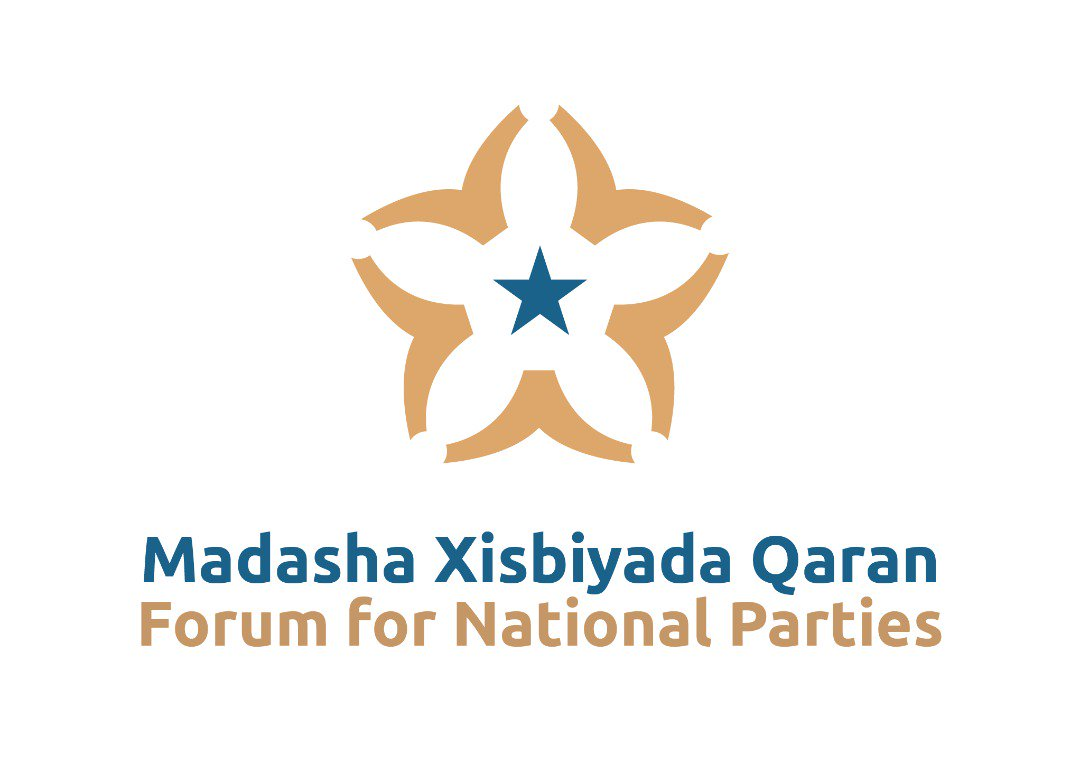
- Leader: Sharif Sheikh Ahmed
- Founder: Sharif Sheikh Ahmed
- Founded: November 7, 2019
- Dissolved: 2021–2022 Somali parliamentary election
- Succeeded by: Madasha Samatabixinta Soomaaliya
- Headquarters: Mogadishu
- Membership: Himilo Qaran; Union for Peace and Development Party; National Progressive Party (Somalia); Xisbiga Kulan; Xisbiga Nabadda; Ilays Party
- Ideology: Islamic democracy

The Forum for National Parties (Somali: Madasha Xisbiyada Qaran) is an alliance of political parties in Somalia founded in October 2019. The alliance includes Himilo Qaran party, led by former President Sharif Sheikh Ahmed, and Peace and Development Party led by incumbent President Hassan Sheikh Mohamud. Other key leaders joining the coalition include Ilays party leader Abdulkadir Osoble, former South West President Sharif Hassan and former defense minister Mohamed Abdi, the first interim president of Jubaland.

The alliance has been formed ahead of the 2022 Somali elections, when for the first time since 1969 Somalia was set to hold one man one vote elections. Reconciliation and dialogue between the federal government and federal member states will be critical to making further progress on political, security and economic reforms.

== Ideology ==
The Forum for National Parties (FNP) is committed to;

- Promotion of human rights
- The rule of law
- Standards of international law
- Standards of justice
- Participatory consultative and inclusive government
- The separation of powers between the legislature, executive and an independent judiciary, in order to ensure accountability, efficiency and responsiveness to the interests of the people
- believes that all citizens, regardless of sex, social or economic status, political opinion, clan, disability, occupation, or dialect shall have equal rights and duties before the law.

== Humanitarian Aid ==
In November 2019 the FNP donated $200,00 to flood victims in Beledweyne, Bardale and other areas affected by the floods and declared the establishment of two special teams to co-ordinate the relief work.

== FNP calls for withdrawal of Ethiopian troops ==
In November 2019 the FNP repeatedly called for immediate intervention by the UN and AU for the withdrawal of Ethiopian troops from Gedo, stating the presence of Ethiopian forces in the region is illegal and outside the AMISON framework.

In May 2020 the Forum for National Parties, described the presence of non-AMISOM Ethiopian troops in Somalia as;

A blatant disregard for the longstanding agreement between the Federal Republic of Somalia and the AMISOM troop contributing countries (TCC), which clearly defines the scope of the African Union peacekeeping mission in our country.

They went on to accuse the ENDF of a 'cavalier attitude' in there response to having shot down a civilian plane in Berdale which was carrying medical supplies for assistance in the Covid19 pandemic. The Forum for National Parties warned that the Ethiopian government's intention was to;

intervene in the upcoming federal parliamentary and presidential elections, and to intimidate opposition groups all across the country

They blamed the Special Representative of the Chairperson of the African Union Commission for Somalia, Ambassador Francisco Madeira, for not only failing to secure the withdrawal of the non-AMISOM Ethiopian troops, but having worked in collusion with them to interfere in the South West election in 2018 and Jubaland election in August 2019.

== Dialogue between FNP and FGS ==
In December 2019 the FNP released a statement explaining their reasons for withdrawing from talks with the Federal Government of Somalia and accusing the government of human rights abuses and lack of transparency.

== Appointment of Prime Minister ==
In September 2020 the FNP voiced concern that delays by the Farmajo regime in appointing a new Prime Minister could paralyse the Somali government.

== Election Model ==
The FNP stressed the importance of including all regional states in talks aimed at reaching a consensus on the election model. The leaders of Puntland and Jubbaland states have so far not been included. FNP also called on the government to invite political parties into the talks.
