= Dahir Mohamud Gelle =

Somali diplomat

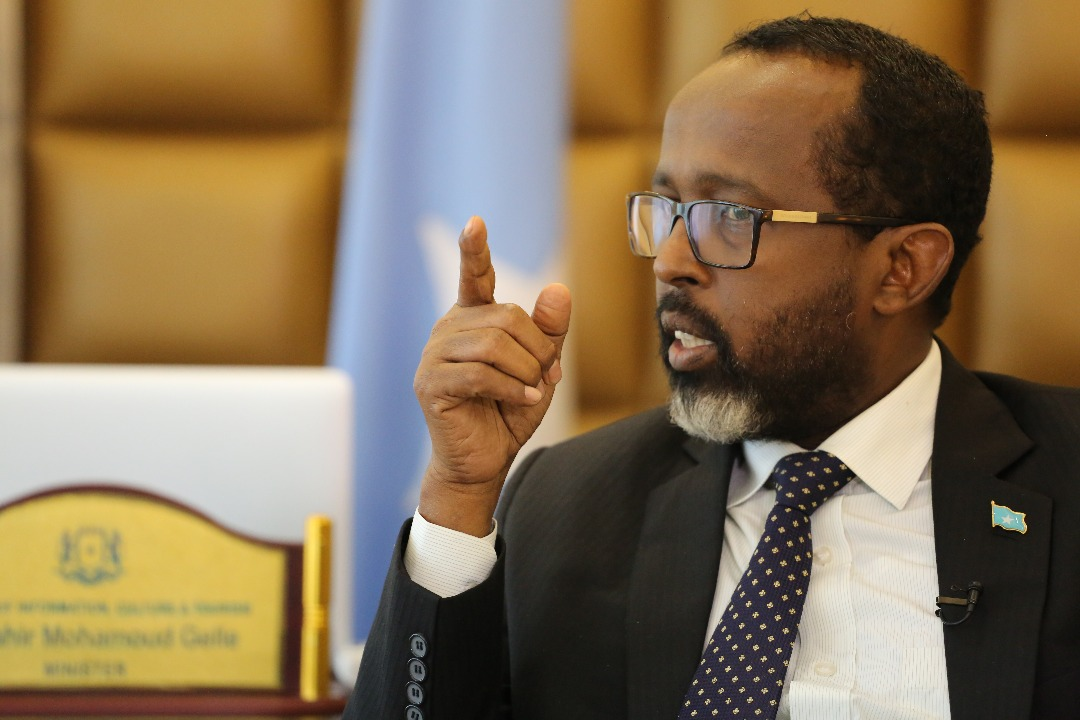

Personal details
- Born: Mogadishu, Somalia
- Party: Independent

Ambassador Dahir Mohamud Gelle (Somali: Daahir Maxamuud Geele, Arabic: طاهر محمود جيلي) is a Somali diplomat and politician. Ambassador Dahir was born in Mogadishu in 1966. Having completed his primary and secondary education in Mogadishu, Dahir earned a Bachelors of Arts in Jurisprudence and Law at Al-Azhar University in Cairo Egypt. He later joined the Institute of Arab Research and Studies for a graduate Diploma in Political Science, and a Master of Arts in Political Science. Dahir has accumulated knowledge from years of practice in the public, private and voluntary sectors. In his service in the public sector, Dahir has served as the Director of Foreign Relations Department of the Ministry of Justice and Religious Affairs, been a member of the Somali Federal Parliament, become twice the Minister for Information. On a one-year term, Dahir led the Daljir Forum for national dialogue as the chairperson. He has been the Somali Ambassador to Saudi Arabia from 2015 to 2018. In private sector practice, Dahir served as the Managing Director of Ar-risaala Radio station. Also, he is the founder of the Holy Quran radio station. Between 1995 and 2000, he worked for a charity aimed to alleviate the suffering of the needy people.
