= Himilo Qaran =

Islamic democratic political party in Somalia

Himilo Qaran الرؤية الوطنية
- Leader: Sharif Sheikh Ahmed
- Chairperson: Sulaiman Mohamud Hashi
- Secretary-General: Yusuf Hussein Ahmed Gamadid
- Founder: Sharif Sheikh Ahmed
- Founded: 2018
- Registered: National Independent Electoral Commission (NIEC)
- Headquarters: Mogadishu
- Ideology: Islamic democracy
- Political position: Centre-left

Website
- himiloqaran.so

Himilo Qaran (Arabic: الرؤية الوطنية, A National Mission) is a Somali political party founded in December 2018. The party was formed ahead of the 2021 Somali elections. It is led by Sharif Sheikh Ahmed.

In October 2019, Himilo Qaran joined the Forum for National Parties, an alliance of Somali political parties led by former President Sharif Sheikh Ahmed.
