= Union for Peace and Development Party =

Somali socially conservative political party

Union for Peace and Development Party Midowga Nabadda Iyo Horumarka حزب الاتحاد من أجل السلام والتنمية
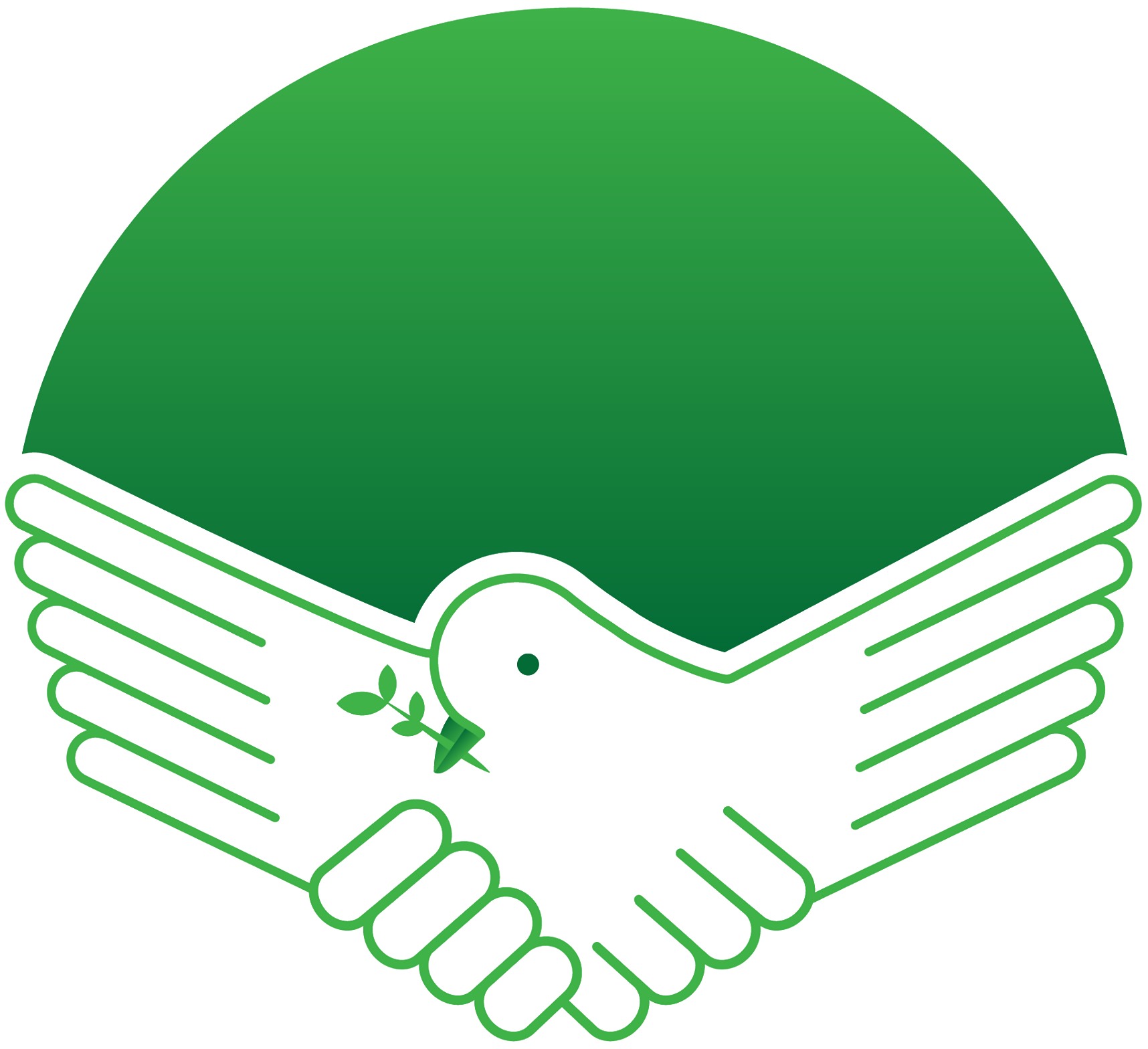
- Leader: Hassan Sheikh Mohamud
- Chairperson: Hassan Sheikh Mohamud
- Secretary-General: Abdirahman Mohamed Husen
- Founders: Daljir Party; Peace and Development Party, Horseed Caucus
- Founded: 4 October 2018
- Headquarters: Wadada Garoonka, Dagmada Wadajir, Mogadishu
- Youth wing: UPD Youth
- Ideology: Conservatism; Islamic democracy; Somali nationalism
- Political position: Centre-right
- National affiliation: Forum for National Parties
- Colors: Green; White

Website
- upd.so

The Union for Peace and Development Party (Somali: Xisbiga Midowga Nabadda iyo Horumarka, UPD or XMNH), is a socially conservative political party in Somalia. The ideology is a composition of nationalism and moderate Islamism. The UPD party is one of the largest Somali political parties and some leading members of the party were former members of the government of former Somali president Sharif Sheikh Ahmed, and incumbent Somali president Hassan Sheikh Mohamud. UPD is also a member of the Forum for National Parties which is led by Sharif Sheikh Ahmed.

In 2018, while the UPD was being formed, it was awarded a registration certificate, and the party was officially unveiled on 4 October 2018. The first official gathering took place in mid April 2019 where it elected a new leader of the party, executive members and central body of the party.

As of October 2018, Hassan Sheikh Mohamud is the leader of the UPD.
