= Hassan Sheikh Mohamud =

President of Somalia

His Excellency Hassan Sheikh Mohamud
- Xasan Sheekh Maxamuud حسن الشيخ محمود
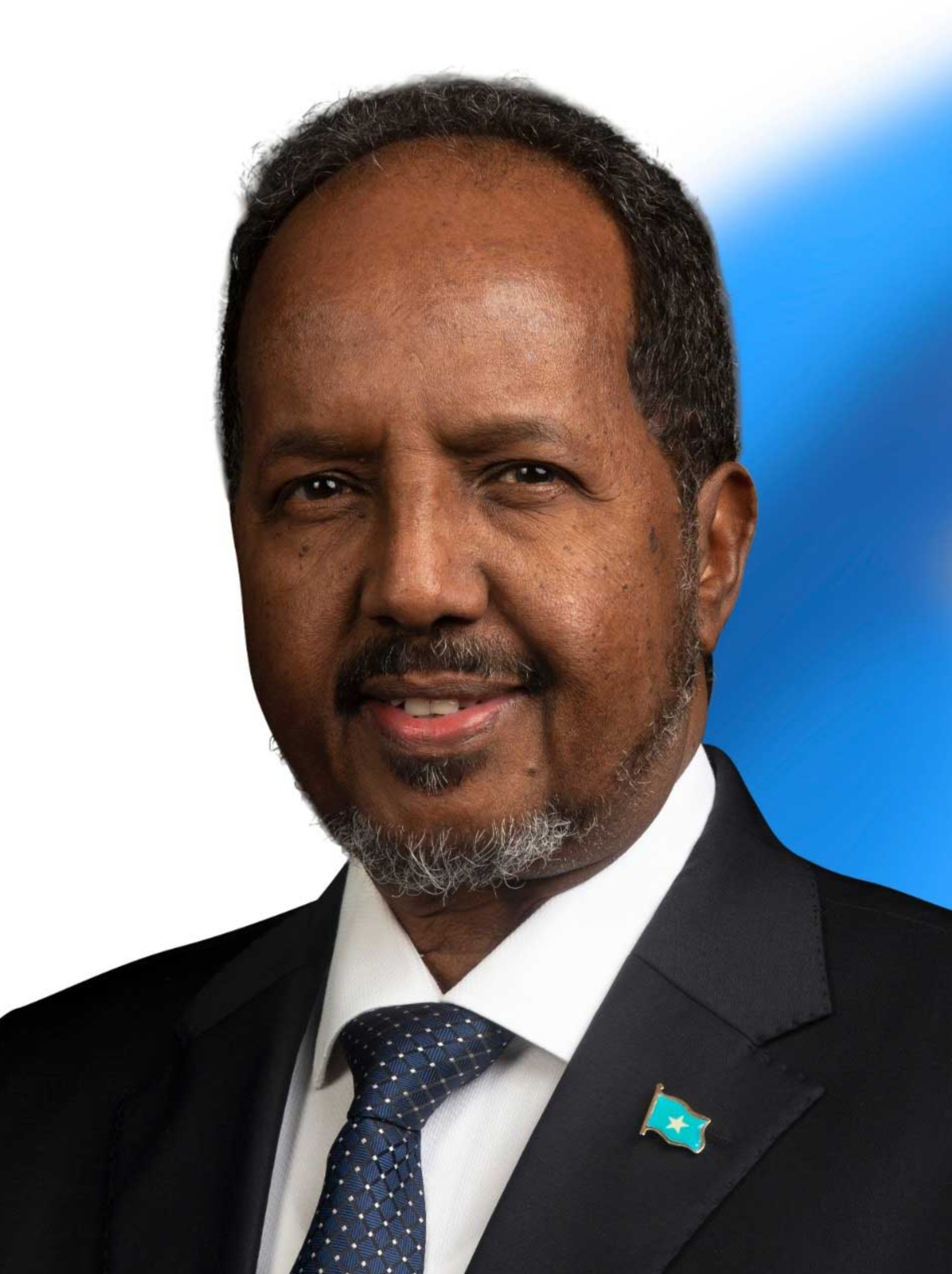
- Hassan in 2022

8th President of Somalia
- Disputed (Note: The presidency has been disputed since 15 May 2026, with Mohamud asserting that the constitutional amendments passed on 30 March 2024 means that he continues to be the legitimate president until 15 May 2027. The opposition dispute the constitutional amendments as being invalid, stating that the constitutional term of Mohamud expired on 15 May 2026 in accordance with the provisional constitution of Somalia.)
- Assumed office 23 May 2022
- Prime Minister: Mohamed Hussein Roble; Hamza Abdi Barre
- Preceded by: Mohamed Abdullahi Mohamed
- In office 16 September 2012 – 16 February 2017
- Prime Minister: Abdi Farah Shirdon; Abdiweli Sheikh Ahmed; Omar Sharmarke
- Preceded by: Mohamed Osman Jawari (acting)
- Succeeded by: Mohamed Abdullahi Mohamed

Chairman of the Union for Peace and Development Party
- Incumbent
- Assumed office 4 October 2018
- Succeeded by: Position established

Chairman of the Peace and Development Party
- In office 20 April 2011 – 4 October 2018
- Preceded by: Position established
- Succeeded by: Position abolished

Personal details
- Born: 29 November 1955 (age 70) Jalalaqsi, Somalia
- Party: Peace and Development Party (2011–2018); Union for Peace and Development Party (2018–present)
- Spouses: Sahro Hassan; Qamar Ali Omar
- Children: 9
- Education: Somali National University; Barkatullah University; University for Peace (Ph.D.)
- Website: hassansheikh.so

Hassan Sheikh Mohamud (Somali: Xasan Sheekh Maxamuud; Arabic: حسن شيخ محمود, romanized: Ḥasan Shaykh Muḥamūd; born 29 November 1955) is a Somali politician who is serving as president of Somalia since 2022, his presidency being disputed since 2026. He previously held the office from 2012 to 2017.

Hassan was previously a university professor and dean at SIMAD University, which he co-founded. During 2012 he was elected President of the Transitional Federal Government (TFG). Time magazine placed him on an annual list of the 100 most influential people in the world in 2013. During 2014 he controversially welcomed the entry of Ethiopian troops into the African Union mission in the wake of the 2006 invasion. His first administration faced serious criticism for rampant corruption, media restrictions and abuse of power.

After losing power in 2017, he became the founder and current chairman of the Union for Peace and Development Party. He was indirectly elected to a non-consecutive term as President of the Federal Republic of Somalia in 2022.

== Early life and education ==
Hassan Sheikh Mohamud was born in the Hiiran region. His father is from the Caligaaf Subclan of the Wecesle Clan of the Abgaal community, and his mother from the Hawadle clan. Hassan attended primary and secondary schools in his hometown. He later moved to the capital Mogadishu in 1978, where he studied for three years at the local Politicnique Institute. In 1981, he earned an undergraduate diploma in technology from the institution.

In 1986, Hassan journeyed to India and began attending Bhopal University (now Barkatullah University) where he completed a master's degree in technical education in 1988. Hassan is also a graduate of Eastern Mennonite University's Summer Peacebuilding Institute based in Harrisonburg, Virginia. In 2001, he completed three of the SPI's intensive courses, studying mediation, trauma healing, and designing learner-centered trainings. Hassan is married to Qamar Ali Omar and has seven children.

Following his second term election for the presidency of Somalia, the University for Peace revealed that Hassan is a Ph.D. candidate at the university. In October 2022, the presidency announced that Hassan defended his doctoral dissertation in Peace, Governance and Development, the first sitting Somali president to do so.

== Early career ==
In a professional capacity, Hassan accepted a position as an instructor and trainer at the Lafole Technical Secondary School. He later joined the Somali National University-affiliated Technical Teachers' Training College in 1984. In 1986, he became the department's head.

When the civil war broke out in the early 1990s, Hassan remained in Somalia and acted as a consultant with various NGOs, UN bureaus, and peace and development projects. He worked as an education officer for UNICEF in the central and southern parts of the country from 1993 to 1995. In 1999, he also co-established the Somali Institute of Management and Administration (SIMAD) in the capital. The institution subsequently grew into the SIMAD University, with Hassan acting as dean until 2010.

Hassan entered Somali politics the following year, when he established the independent Peace and Development Party (PDP). PDP members unanimously elected him as the party's chairman in April 2011, with a mandate to serve as leader for the next three years. In August 2012, Hassan was selected as a Member of Parliament (MP) in the newly formed Federal Parliament of Somalia. Besides academic and civic work, he is also a successful entrepreneur.

== President of Somalia ==
=== First Administration ===
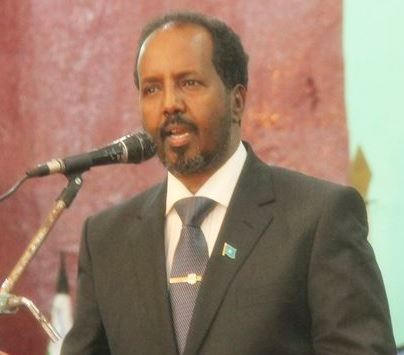
Hassan Sheikh Mohamud at his presidential inauguration ceremony, September 2012.

On 10 September 2012, legislators elected Hassan President of Somalia during the country's 2012 presidential elections. After the first round of voting, former president Sharif Sheikh Ahmed emerged as the frontrunner, amassing 64 votes. Hassan was a close second with 60 votes, and Prime Minister Abdiweli Mohamed Ali placed third with 32 votes. Hassan went on to earn a lopsided win in the final round, defeating Sharif. Despite allegations of corruption and bribery securing the votes required for Hassan's election, Sharif and others did not dispute the results.

Hassan's appointment was welcomed throughout the world. The UN Special Representative for Somalia Augustine Mahiga issued a statement describing the election as a "great step forward on the path to peace and prosperity". Similarly, the AU Commission for Somalia hailed the selection and pledged to support the new leadership.

On 16 September 2012, Hassan was formally inaugurated as President of Somalia. On 6 October 2012, Hassan appointed political newcomer Abdi Farah Shirdon as the new Prime Minister of Somalia. On 4 November 2012, Shirdon named a new Cabinet, which was later endorsed by the legislature on 13 November 2012.

=== Assassination attempts ===
On 12 September 2012, while Hassan was meeting with foreign delegates in Mogadishu, suicide bombers and gunmen attempted an attack on the Jazeera Hotel where the dignitaries had convened. There were reportedly around 10 casualties, though one of the assembled statesmen was unharmed. Seemingly unfazed by the incidents, Hassan continued his speech before the gathered press and foreign officials, stating that "things like what's happening now outside will continue for some time, but I'm sure and I'm confident it's the last things that's taking place here in Somalia" The al-Shabaab militant group later claimed responsibility for the attacks.

On 3 September 2013, a roadside bomb detonated near vehicles in Hassan's convoy in Merca. One Somali soldier was injured in the blast, but Hassan was unharmed and continued on to his destination. Al-Shabaab later claimed responsibility for the explosion. Abdirahman Omar Osman, a spokesman for the president, dismissed the group's statement as propaganda, indicating that Hassan's convoy was not targeted and that it was uncertain what might have happened to an earlier convoy.

On 7 October 2015, al-Shabaab gunmen ambushed and killed Dr Liban Osman, nephew of Hassan, and one other man as their car was traveling through the Wadajir neighborhood of the capital city Mogadishu.

On 18 March 2025, al-Shabaab attempted to assassinate Hassan in Mogadishu with roadside bombs near Villa Somalia while his entourage headed for Aden Adde International Airport.

=== Reconstruction and development ===
Mohamud had prioritized the enhancement of basic services like health and education, with a view to improving the living conditions of Somalis. This goal was actualized through the implementation of several development projects, such as Mogadishu Port Rehabilitation Project and the reconstruction of Mogadishu airport, roads, schools, and hospitals, amongst other infrastructure developments, which have had a demonstrably positive effect on the lives of many Somalis.

=== Domestic policy ===
==== Easing of arms embargo ====
Upon assuming office, Hassan and his Cabinet resumed efforts by Somali and international stakeholders to end the 21-year UN arms embargo on Somalia, the oldest such global weapons blockade. The Security Council had imposed the prohibition in 1992, shortly after the start of the civil war and the toppling of the Siad Barre regime, in order to stop the flow of weapons to feuding militia groups. An eventual repeal of the embargo had been among the future objectives of the signatories in the transitional Roadmap political process of 2011–2012. Hassan's government, Somali security analysts and military experts argued that lifting the ban on the procurement of arms would facilitate the Somali authorities' attempts at strengthening the Somali Armed Forces, and would more effectively equip the military to quash the remnants of the Islamist insurgency. The United States, African Union, Arab League, and IGAD all backed the proposal. In March 2013, UN Secretary-General Ban Ki-moon likewise urged Security Council members to vote to remove the sanctions so as to help the Somali authorities fortify their security apparatus and consolidate military gains.

Although Britain and France reportedly expressed reservations over increasing the general flow of arms into Somalia, UK officials began drafting a resolution to ease the embargo on weapons purchases by the Somali government for a provisional period of one year. The draft resolution would require either the Somali authorities or the state supplying the military equipment to notify the council "at least five days in advance of any deliveries of weapons and military equipment[...] providing details of such deliveries and assistance and the specific place of delivery in Somalia." Additionally, the proposal mandates that the Somali government should routinely provide updates on the army's structural status, as well as information on the extant infrastructure and protocols designed to ensure the weaponry's safe delivery, storage and maintenance.

In January 2014, at an African Union Summit in Addis Ababa, Hassan requested an extension of the UN Security Council's weapons purchasing mandate for Somalia. He indicated that the Somali defence forces required better military equipment and arms to more effectively combat militants. On 5 March 2014, the UN Security Council unanimously voted to extend the partial easing of the arms embargo on Somalia until 25 October of the year.

==== National reconciliation ====
In April 2013, Hassan resumed national reconciliation talks between the central government in Mogadishu and the authorities in Hargeisa. Organized by the government of Turkey in Ankara, the meeting ended with a signed agreement between Hassan and Ahmed Mahamoud Silanyo, President of secessionist Somaliland in the northwest, agreeing to allocate fairly to the Somaliland its portion of the development aid earmarked for Somalia as a whole and to cooperate on security.

In August 2013, the Somali federal government signed a national reconciliation agreement in Addis Ababa with the autonomous Jubaland administration based in Kismayu, southern Somalia. Endorsed by the federal State Minister for the Presidency Farah Abdulkadir on behalf of Hassan, the pact was brokered by the Foreign Ministry of Ethiopia and came after protracted bilateral talks. Under the terms of the agreement, Jubaland will be administered for a two-year period by a Juba Interim Administration and led by the region's incumbent president, Ahmed Mohamed Islam (Madobe). The regional president will serve as the chairperson of a new Executive Council, to which he will appoint three deputies. Management of Kismayo's seaport and airport will also be transferred to the Federal Government after a period of six months, and revenues and resources generated from these infrastructures will be earmarked for Jubaland's service delivery and security sectors as well as local institutional development. Additionally, the agreement includes the integration of Jubaland's military forces under the central command of the Somali National Army (SNA), and stipulates that the Juba Interim Administration will command the regional police. UN Special Envoy to Somalia Nicholas Kay hailed the pact as "a breakthrough that unlocks the door for a better future for Somalia," with AUC, UN, EU and IGAD representatives also present at the signing.

In February 2015, Hassan chaired a three-day consultation forum in Mogadishu with presidents Abdiweli Mohamed Ali, Ahmed Mohamed Islam and Sharif Hassan Sheikh Adan of the Puntland, Jubaland and South West State regional administrations, respectively. Under the rubric of the New Deal for Somalia, Hassan held additional national reconciliation talks with the regional leaders in Garowe in April and May of the year. The officials therein signed a seven-point agreement in Garowe authorizing the immediate deployment of the 3,000 troops from Puntland toward the Somali National Army. They also agreed to integrate soldiers from the other regional states into the SNA.

==== Vote of no confidence ====
In November 2013, Hassan asked Prime Minister Abdi Farah Shirdon to resign from office on the grounds that Shirdon was allegedly ineffective in the job. Hassan was reportedly acting on the advice of the State Minister for Presidency, Farah Abdulkadir. On 12 November 2013, Shirdon confirmed that there was a dispute between himself and the president, but indicated that the row was constitutional rather than political. He also asserted that the matter should be resolved in parliament. According to MP Mohamed Abdi Yusuf, the rift between Hassan and Shirdon centered over through what constitutional mechanism and by whom the Cabinet was ultimately to be formed.

On 24 November 2013, 168 MPs led by former TFG Parliament Speaker Sharif Hassan Sheikh Adan endorsed a document submitted to parliament, which outlined a motion against Prime Minister Shirdon's administration. A parliamentary vote of confidence was later held against Shirdon on 2 December 2013. Parliament Speaker Mohamed Osman Jawari subsequently announced that 184 of the present MPs had voted against Shirdon, whereas 65 legislators had voted to retain him. On 5 December 2013, Shirdon released a statement confirming that he and his Cabinet accepted the legislature's decision. UN Special Representative for Somalia Nicholas Kay paid tribute to the outgoing prime minister, noting that Shirdon had endeavoured to promote growth and progress and was an important principal in establishing the New Deal Compact between Somalia and its international partners. He also commended the legislators on adhering to procedural rules during the vote, and pledged to work constructively with the succeeding administration.

On 12 December 2013, Hassan named veteran economist Abdiweli Sheikh Ahmed as the new prime minister.

==== Benadir administration and Chief of Staff ====
In February–March 2014, Hassan began a reformation of the Pisun Chief of Staff and Benadir regional administration in an effort to strengthen their senior leadership. On 27 February 2014, he issued a presidential decree naming former military court chairman Hassan Mohamed Hussein Mungab as the new Mayor of Mogadishu and Governor of the Banaadir region. Part of an effort to firm up on municipal security, the appointment came after consultations with Prime Minister Abdiweli Sheikh Ahmed and Interior Minister Abdullahi Godah Barre. Mungab replaced Mohamed Nur (Tarsan) in the mayorship. The same month, President Mohamud also replaced Kamal Dahir Hassan "Gutale" as Chief of Staff. Through a presidential decree issued on 10 March, Hassan likewise sacked the General Secretary of the Benadir regional administration Abdikafi Hassan, as well as Benadir's Deputy Governors Ali Iikar Gure and Warsame Mohamed Ahmed "Jodah". Hassan concurrently reassigned former Chief of Staff Hassan as the Benadir administration's new Deputy Governor.

==== Youth development initiatives ====
In August 2014, on the occasion of the U.S.-Africa summit in Washington, D.C., Hassan announced a number of new development projects aimed at Somalia's youth. The conference was the largest of its kind to be held by an incumbent United States administration, and was attended by the heads of state and government of all of Africa's countries.

Of the new youth initiatives that the Federal Government of Somalia is slated to implement, Hassan indicated that a comprehensive youth empowerment framework would be prioritized, with attendant legislation and policies. A university accreditation system, an employment creation program, and youth enterprise would also be developed. Additionally, local and regional youth representation in civil, political and governmental activities would be enhanced. To this end, two Youth Advisers would be named to the Office of the President, and the minimum age for prospective officeholders would be lowered to 18. Leadership of Somalia's first national park would also be assigned to young managers so as to strengthen environmental preservation and potential tourism opportunities. In coastal areas, jobs in marine ecosystem management and sustainable fishing would be generated. Additional opportunities would be made available through the introduction of fiber optics and 3G. The federal government would likewise support the establishment of the Somali Film Council.

According to Hassan, the Somali federal government delegation is scheduled to meet with its U.S. partners to discuss further ways to promote economic growth and investment in Somalia, with the objective of creating new opportunities, empowering youth, and strengthening ties between both nations.

==== International Bank of Somalia ====
In October 2014, Hassan officially opened the International Bank of Somalia (IBS) at a ceremony in Mogadishu. A number of invited officials attended the inauguration event, including Mayor of Mogadishu and Benadir Governor Hassan Mohamed Hussein Mungab, Minister of Finance Hussein Abdi Halane, Minister of Public Works and Reconstruction Nadifo Mohamed Osman, Vice Chairman of the Central Bank of Somalia, Chamber of Commerce representatives, and businesspeople. The bank was established by a group of entrepreneurs, whom the gathered officials commended for their commitment to providing international banking services to facilitate local commercial activities. Additionally, the chairman of the bank indicated that the institution possessed a swift code permitting international banking, and that its emphasis would be on developing the nation's livestock, agricultural and other economic resources.

==== Second vote of no confidence ====
In October–November 2014, a rift developed between Hassan and new prime minister Abdiweli Sheikh Ahmed over a cabinet reshuffle by Ahmed. On 25 October, Premier Ahmed transferred former Minister of Justice and Constitutional Affairs Farah Sh. Abdulkadir Mohamed, Peace and Development Party member and former Deputy Minister of Foreign Affairs Mahad Mohamed Salad, and other key allies of Hassan to other positions within the Council of Ministers. Hassan immediately issued a statement declaring the cabinet reshuffle null and void, arguing that he had not been consulted about the move. He also ordered all of the reassigned ministers to carry on with their ordinary duties.

On 27 October, UN Special Envoy to Somalia Nicholas Kay met with Hassan and Ahmed at the Villa Somalia compound in an unsuccessful attempt to broker an agreement between the two officials. Puntland Information Minister Abdiweli Hirsi Abdulle also suggested that the row should be resolved through constitutional means, asserted that the Puntland regional administration was prepared to mediate between the two federal leaders, and called on international representatives to do the same. Similarly, Speaker of the Federal Parliament Mohamed Osman Jawari indicated that he was confident that the disagreement could be resolved through legal channels.

In early November, UN Ambassador Kay and EU representatives Alexander Rondos and Michele Cervone issued separate press statements urging Hassan and Ahmed to set aside their differences for the greater communal good, and to continue instead working toward the goals enshrined in Vision 2016. Kay also expressed concern about the possibility of vote buying marring a parliamentary vote of confidence, and indicated that any such potential political disruption would be reported to the UN Security Council. Similarly, Rondos and Cervone in their capacity as financial stakeholders urged the Federal MPs to adhere to standard legislative protocols. On 3 November, President Mohamud issued a statement assuring the international community of his administration's continued commitment to fulfilling Vision 2016. He also called on foreign partners to respect Somalia's sovereignty and allow its legislative process to proceed constitutionally. On 4 November, during a special parliamentary session, several federal lawmakers expressed disappoint over Ambassador Kay's statement, asking that he either apologize or step down from office. Other legislators from Puntland supported Kay's press release, which emphasized governmental continuity and unity.

Hassan and Ahmed concurrently began holding consultations with various Federal MPs to gather support ahead of a potential vote of confidence. On 6 November, IGAD Special Envoy to Somalia Ambassador Abdi Afey met with the two leaders to try and broker an agreement, and also conferred with Parliament Speaker Jawari. Additionally, almost 100 MPs concurrently lodged a no confidence motion against Prime Minister Ahmed. Although Federal Parliament Speaker Jawari received the motion, a date of deliberation in the legislature was not specified.

On 9 November, Federal Parliament Speaker Jawari and international representatives began separate mediation efforts in a final attempt to resolve the differences between Hassan and Ahmed. The Egyptian government also called for an urgent meeting of the Somalia Committee within the Arab League to assist in the reconciliation talks. On 10 November, the U.S. Department of State issued a statement likewise indicating that a parliamentary vote of confidence would be counterproductive. It instead urged the Federal Government of Somalia's leaders to unite, and suggested that the U.S. authorities would not attend a conference in Copenhagen on Somalia's New Deal as long as the FGS's leadership was divided.

On 11 November, legislators met in parliament to deliberate on the no-confidence motion. Supporters of Ahmed subsequently began to make noise, effectively precluding any discussion. Consequently, Federal Parliament Speaker Jawari indefinitely adjourned the session.

On 11 November, a spokesman for the UK Foreign & Commonwealth Office reiterated the international community's call for all Somali parties to set aside their differences, respect parliamentary protocol, and work together for the greater good. Due to the political infighting, the Danish government also canceled a planned meeting in Copenhagen between Hassan and global Somali community members ahead of the New Deal conference on Somalia. On 14 November, the U.S. government likewise warned that it would cut financial assistance to Somalia if the top Somali Federal Government officials did not resolve their differences.

On 15 November, a second attempt to hold a parliamentary vote of confidence again failed. Over 100 lawmakers sang the national anthem and held up placards supporting Ahmed, prompting Federal Parliament Speaker Jawari to indefinitely adjourn the session.

On 16 November, MP supporters of Hassan presented a letter to Federal Parliament Speaker Jawari calling for him to convene the legislature so that the vote of confidence could take place. Deputy Prime Minister Ridwan Hersi Mohamed and a number of cabinet ministers and lawmakers supporting Ahmed concurrently met in the capital, and issued a four-point statement defending the cabinet's independence and demanding an end to outside interference with its functions. On 17 November 14 ministers within the 50 member cabinet signed a counter-petition asking the Prime Minister to resign in order to safeguard national interests. Believed to be supporters of the President, the ministerial officials also indicated that they themselves would step down from their positions if the Premier declined to do so within 24 hours. On 18 November, Ahmed convened the first Cabinet meeting in several weeks, after which Deputy Prime Minister Ridwan Hersi Mohamed announced that any minister who was unable to work with the government was free to resign and make way for a replacement.

On 24 November, a third attempt to hold a parliamentary vote of confidence ended in chaos. Lawmakers supporting Ahmed shredded the attendance register as well as their copies of the motion. They also immediately began yelling when Federal Parliament Speaker Jawari entered the hall, prompting the legislative leader to indefinitely adjourn the session. Jawari subsequently issued a statement postponing all parliamentary sessions until a lasting and effective resolution to the rift could be found.

On 24 November, Ahmed released a statement indicating that he made the Cabinet reshuffle to ameliorate the performance of the Council of Ministers and resolve internal wrangles. He likewise indicated that the directive was in line with Article 100 (a) and (b) of the Provisional Constitution, and that the Office of the President's decree attempting to nullify the reshuffle contravened those constitutional clauses. Additionally, Ahmed asserted that the ensuing motion of no confidence was motivated by displeasure over the transfer of one particular Cabinet minister to another portfolio. He also suggested that the motion was regarded by most legislators and the general public as having been driven by graft, that the attempts to table it bypassed the rules and procedures of the parliament, and that it ultimately was an obstacle toward fulfilling the goals enshrined in Vision 2016. Ahmed also commended lawmakers for countering the motion, and applauded the House of the People's leadership for acknowledging that the motion was an impediment on the legislature's functions and instead calling for reconciliatory dialogue to resolve the impasse.

On 4 December, a League of Arab States delegation led by Deputy Prime Minister and Foreign Affairs Minister of Kuwait Sabah al-Khalid al-Sabah held a meeting in Mogadishu with the federal government leaders, wherein they discussed the parliamentary motion and Arab League affairs. On 6 December, the Federal Parliament again convened to hold the vote of confidence. 153 of the present MPs voted in favor of the motion, 80 voted against it, and 2 abstained, thereby ending Ahmed's term as Prime Minister of Somalia.

On 17 December 2014, Hassan appointed former premier Omar Abdirashid Ali Sharmarke as the new prime minister.

==== Somali language regulation ====
In January 2015, at an event commemorating the 42nd anniversary of the official adoption of the Somali Latin script, Hassan announced that the Somali language would be used for all government documents at every state office in Somalia. The President indicated that foreign languages would thereafter be reserved for communication with foreign representatives. He also noted that Somali was part of UNESCO's cross-border languages category, and asserted that no nation achieved significant development without first ensuring the primacy of its native language. Additionally, Hassan announced several associated initiatives, including a new educational curriculum with Somali as the primary language of instruction, rehabilitation of monuments for fallen heroes, completion of renovations on the National Museum, and finalization of the Regional Somali Language Academy in conjunction with the governments of Djibouti and Ethiopia.

==== Judicial Service Commission ====
In March 2015, Hassan issued a presidential decree dissolving the extant Judicial Service Commission. The order did not pertain to the Attorney General and Chief Judge of the High Court positions. Additionally, the dissolution letter from the Office of the President indicated that the panel was inconsistent with the Provisional Constitution and the judicial service law. It recommended instead reformation of the Judicial Service Commission in accordance with Article 109 of the national constitution.

==== Somali Disabled People Council ====
In March 2015, Hassan held a meeting with Somali Disabled People Council (SDPC) representatives in Mogadishu. The officials touched on ways in which the government can assist disabled individuals, among various other matters. Hassan therein vowed to earmark a governmental agency for the disabled, which would liaise with other state offices and gather data on the subpopulation. Additionally, he indicated that the government would organize a nationwide conference devoted to the disabled. SDPC representative Ali Abdullahi Salad in turn applauded Hassan for his dedication to the disabled cause.

==== Special Task Force on Remittances ====
In April 2015, Hassan and Prime Minister Sharmarke in conjunction with the Federal Cabinet officially launched the Special Task Force on Remittances (STFR). The multi-agency initiative is mandated with facilitating the Federal Government of Somalia's new national policy pertaining to the money transfer industry. Its main priority is centered on establishing a comprehensive strategy and a consultative implementation plan for the formalization of the local financial sector. Additionally, the STFR is tasked with helping to foster a business environment and financial infrastructure conducive to growth. It is also empowered to coordinate and speed up the endorsement of financial governance instruments and transparency associated legislation, such as the laws on Anti-Money Laundering (AML) and Counter Financing of Terrorism (CFT). In accordance with the Financial Action Task Force (FATF)'s recommendations, the STFR is in turn slated to oversee the Somali federal government's campaign to ratify various international treaties. The Task Forces' membership is scheduled to be announced shortly, and will be drawn from government institutions, the remittance industry, banks and other key private sector stakeholders.

==== National Tree Week ====
In April 2015, Hassan officially inaugurated National Tree Week at a ceremony in Mogadishu. He therein planted a tree at the Daljirka-Daahsoon junction as a symbol of the environmental importance of plants. Hassan also announced that his administration was slated to launch an ecological preservation project as part of the broader national reconstruction process, and noted the centrality of flora in human society and wildlife. He encouraged the citizenry to avail itself of the occasion to plant as many trees as possible.

=== Foreign policy ===
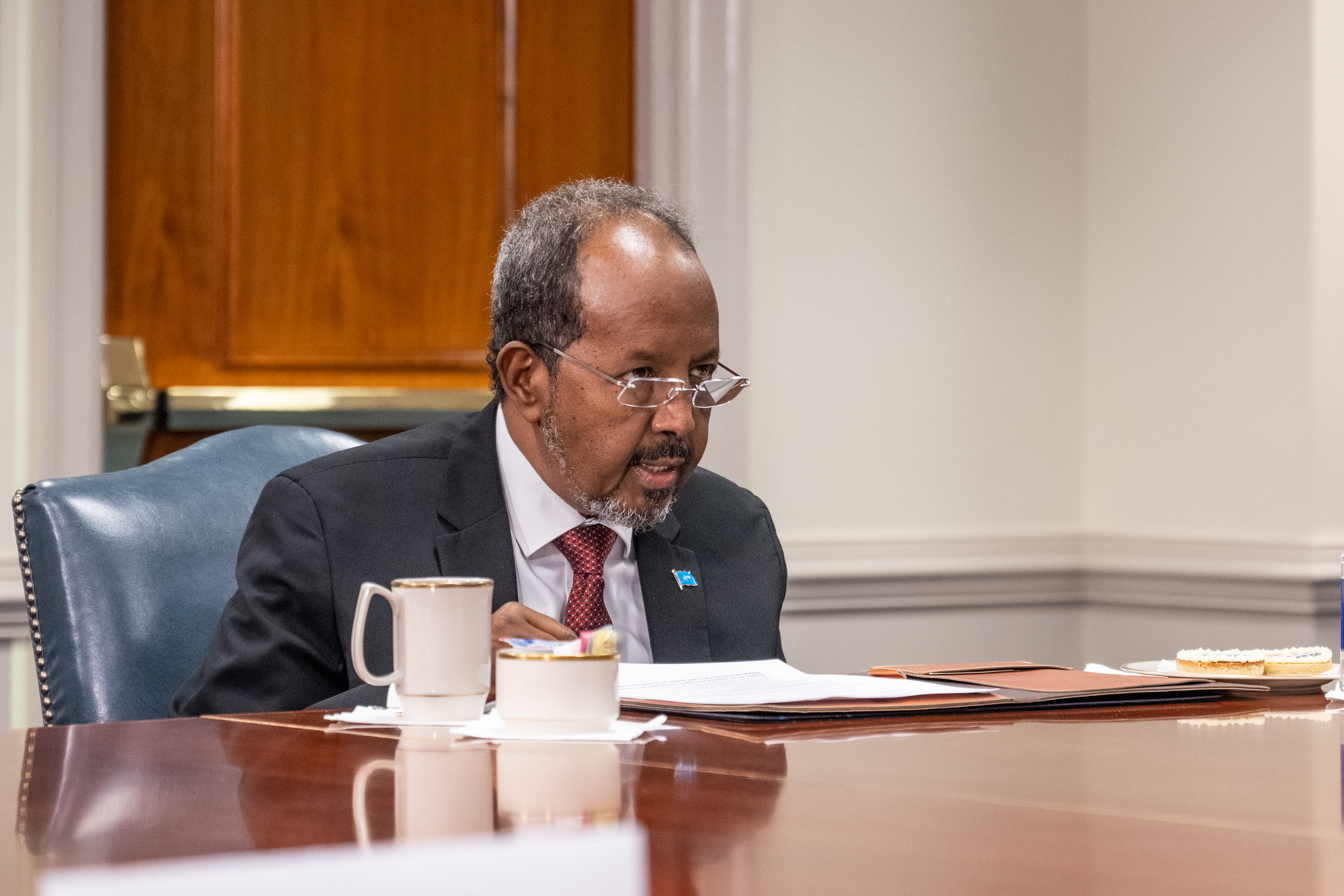
Hassan in the US at The Pentagon in 2022

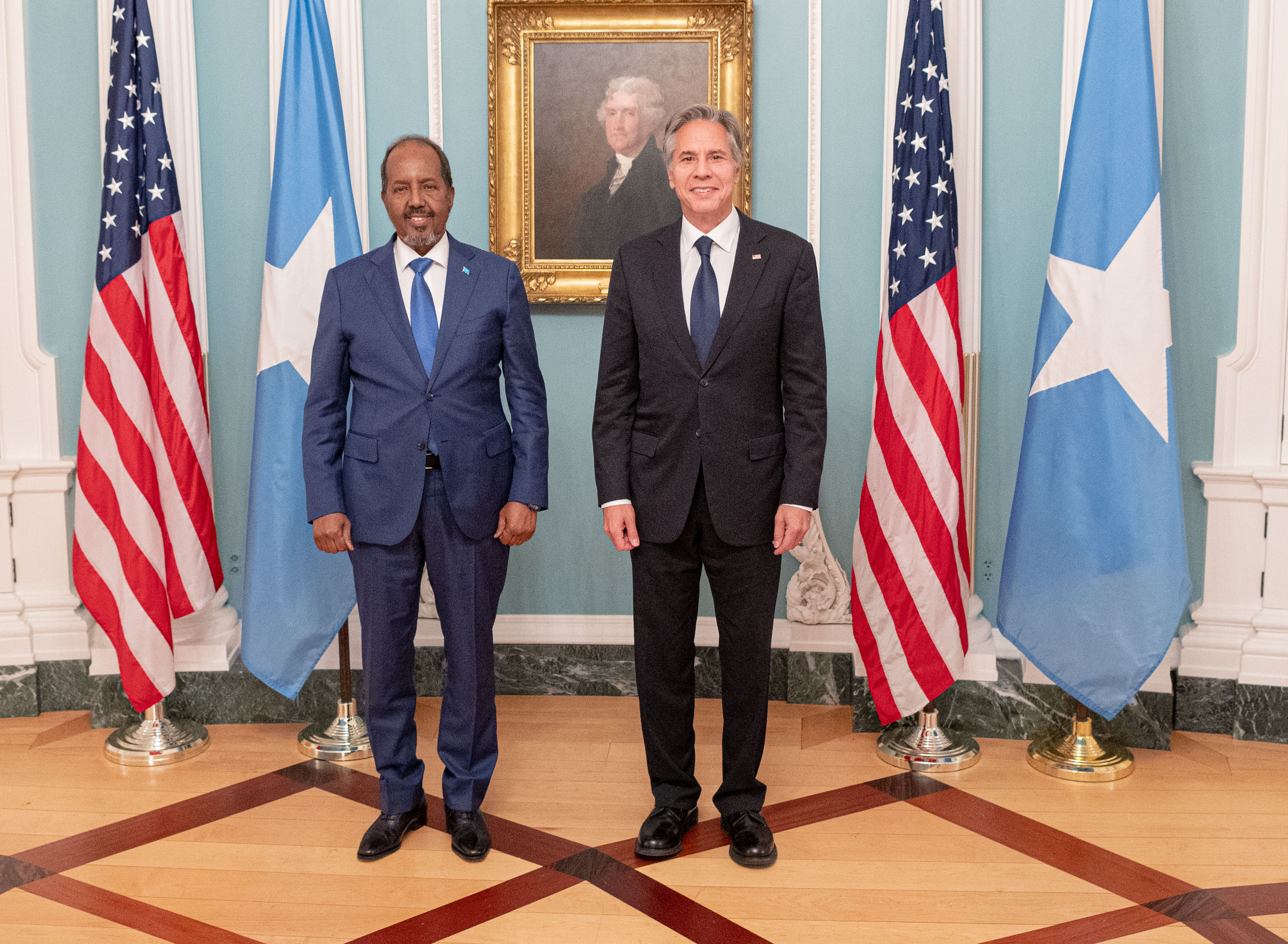
Hassan with US Secretary of State Antony Blinken in 2022

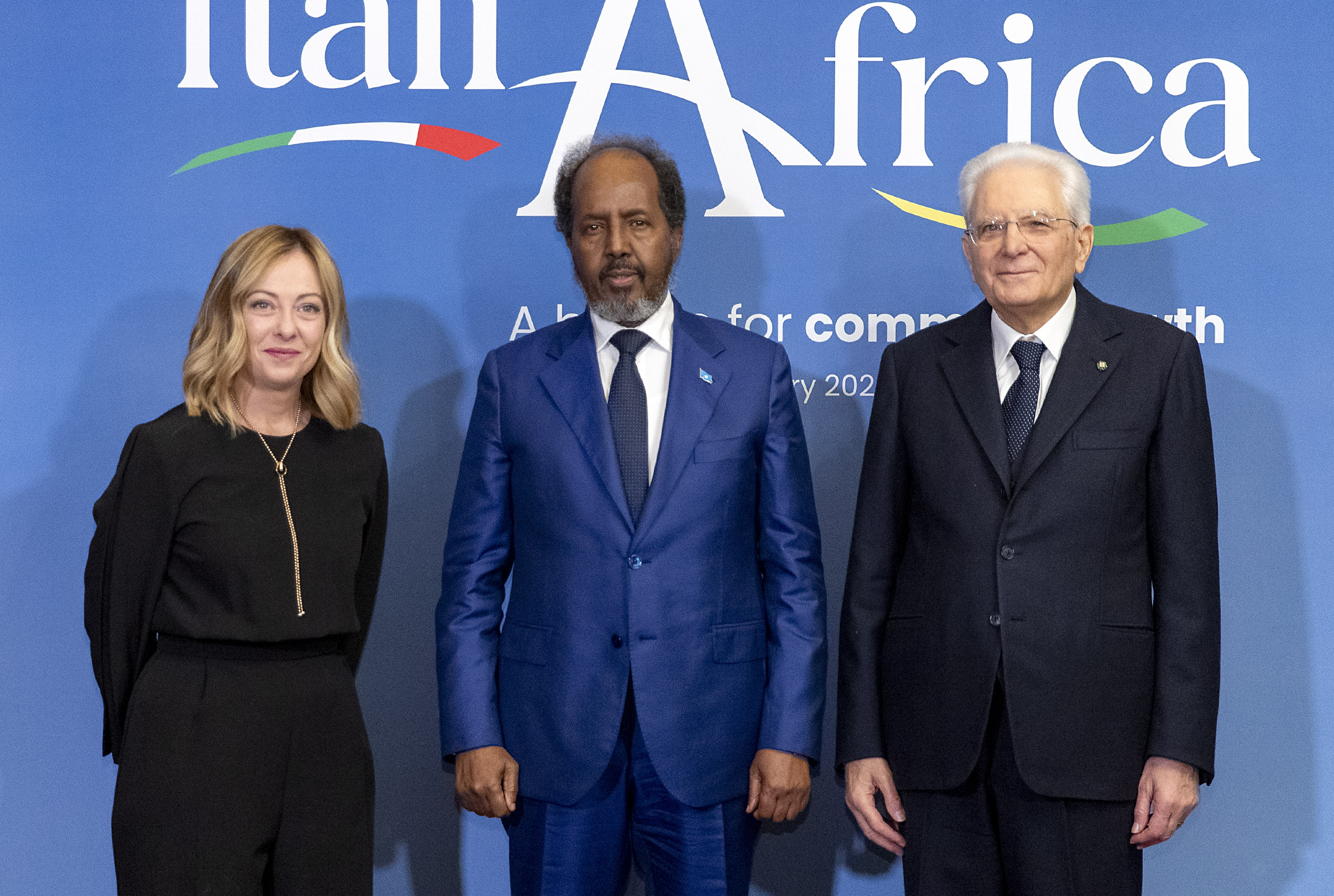
Hassan with Italian Prime Minister Giorgia Meloni and President Sergio Mattarella at the 2024 Italy-Africa Summit in Rome

==== Cotonou Agreement ====
In June 2013, attendants at the ministerial meeting of the European Union and over 70 nations in the African, Caribbean and Pacific Group of States (ACP) approved the Somali government's request to join the Cotonou Agreement. Somalia was immediately granted observer status, with full membership earmarked for 2014. The Cotonou Agreement promotes sustainable development and the reduction and eventual elimination of poverty in ACP member nations. It also aims to integrate ACP countries into the world economy via stronger participation in the drafting of national development strategies, and to advance criminal justice and fight against impunity through the International Criminal Court. President Mohamud welcomed the decision and asserted that the treaty would facilitate the ongoing national reconstruction process, as Somalia would be eligible to receive EU development projects. According to Joe Costello, Ireland's Minister of State for Trade and Development, the endorsement "opens a new chapter in relations between the EU and Somalia and constitutes a visible sign that Somalia has regained its status as a fully-fledged member of the international community."

==== New Deal Compact for Reconstruction and Development ====
In November 2014, Hassan along with UN Under-Secretary for Political Affairs Jeffrey D. Feltman co-chaired an international conference in Copenhagen on the New Deal Compact for Reconstruction and Development. Representatives from Somalia's Puntland, Jubaland, Galmudug and Southwestern federal states also attended the summit, as well as delegations from over 140 countries. Hassan indicated therein that the New Deal Compact was a Somali-led initiative, through which the Federal Government of Somalia developed legal frameworks, initiated state and political reform, re-structured key institutions, and established a foundation for allocating international development assistance toward the central authorities' priority areas. Additionally, Minister of Foreign Affairs of Egypt Sameh Shoukry reaffirmed his administration's support for Somalia's social and security sectors, and noted the Egyptian government's various political brokering efforts.

==== Convention on the Rights of the Child ====
In January 2015, Hassan signed the UN Convention on the Rights of the Child on behalf of the Federal Republic of Somalia at a ceremony in Mogadishu. It is the most widely ratified global human rights treaty, with all but two countries party to it. The signing event was held at the Hamar Jab Jab School in the capital and was attended by various domestic and international officials, including Interim Minister for Information Mustaf Sheikh Ali Dhuhulow, Interim Minister for Women and Human Rights Khadijo Mohamed Diriye, Interim Minister for Agriculture Abdi Mohamed Bafo, Interim Minister for Justice Farah Sheikh Abdulkadir, various federal legislators, UN Special Representative for Somalia Nicholas Kay, and UNICEF Representative for Somalia Steven Lauwerier. The Federal Parliament had already ratified the agreement in December 2014. Following the subsequent signing of the treaty by Hassan, the Federal Government is now slated to formulate and adopt child friendly systems and policies, implement steps geared toward child development, survival, protection and participation, and produce periodic reports on its progress toward that end for the Committee on the Rights of the Child.

=== Second Administration ===
On 16 May 2022, Hassan Sheikh Mohamud regained presidential power after winning the election against the outgoing President Mohamed Abdullahi Mohamed Farmaajo. The elected president vowed to restore stability in Somalia. Following his second term election for the presidency of Somalia, the University for Peace revealed that Hassan is a Ph.D. candidate at the university. In October 2022, the presidency announced that Hassan defended his doctoral dissertation in Peace, Governance and Development, the first sitting Somali president to do so.

On 15 June 2022, Hassan appointed Hamza Abdi Barre as Prime Minister of Somalia.

=== Foreign policy ===
In an interview with Al Jazeera on February 7, 2026, Somali President Hassan Sheikh Mohamud said that Israel's actions in his country were "interference." He stated that Israel's recognition of Somaliland as a breakaway region had exacerbated instability and undermined the international order. At the same time, he declared that Somalia would "never allow" and "counter" any attempt to establish an Israeli base in Somaliland.

=== Constitutional crisis ===
On 28 November 2024, amid a dispute over the holding of regional elections in Jubaland, a judge in the latter region issued an arrest warrant against Mohamud on charges of treason, inciting a civil war, and organizing an armed uprising to disrupt the constitutional order. In response, the federal government issued an arrest warrant against Jubaland president Ahmed Madobe for treason and revealing classified information to foreign entities.

== Controversies ==
=== Corruption ===
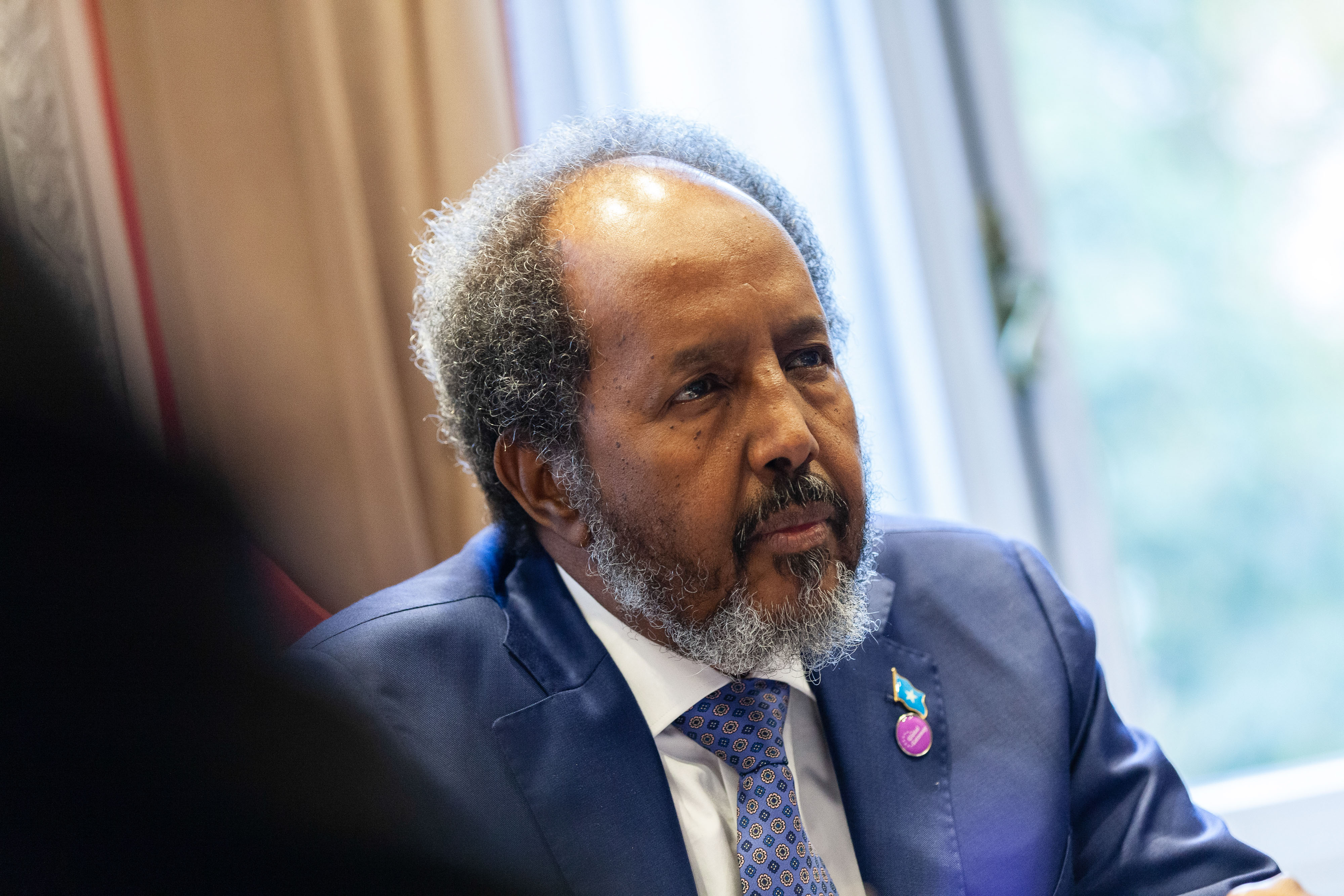
Hassan In 2026

His first administration that operated from 2012 to 2017 faced serious criticism for rampant corruption, media restrictions and abuse of power. The United Nations Monitoring Group accused the administration of arming al-Shabab. A 2013 report alleged a conspiracy between President Mohamoud and a US law firm to steal public funds. He failed to address the rampant corruption during his first term as President of Somalia.

=== Nepotism ===
In March 2023, President Mohamoud appointed his daughter Jehan Hassan Sheikh Mohamoud as his international affairs advisor. This move, unprecedented in post-1991 Somalia, sparked widespread discussion and controversy across social media platforms. The appointment resulted in a rare resignation from a high-ranking Somali official. Following the 32nd Arab League Summit, which marked Syria's reinstatement after a decade-long suspension, Somalia's ambassador to Saudi Arabia, Salim Ma'ow Haji, resigned from his position. Haji cited insults and violations of diplomatic norms by the President's inner circle, notably led by his cousin, Hinda Culusow, alleging that they had obstructed his participation in the summit. While Ambassador Haji found himself excluded from the summit hall, Jehan Mohamoud was prominently present alongside her father. In response to inquiries regarding his daughter's prominent governmental role and her perceived lack of experience, Mohamoud defended the appointment by asserting that his children and relatives are "citizens just like everyone else."

=== Son's traffic accident ===
On 30 November 2023, a son of Mohamud, Mohammed Hassan Sheikh Mohamud killed a Turkish citizen Yunus Emre Göçer riding a motorcycle in an accident in Istanbul, Turkey. Mohamed Hassan Sheikh Mahomud caused the accident while driving a vehicle belonging to the Somali Embassy in Ankara. The Turkish police later took him into custody. The victim, a motor courier, died on 6 December 2023. The vehicle belonged to the Somali embassy and had diplomatic licence plates, although the son was not directly connected with the embassy. Although the court initially imposed a two-and-a-half-year prison sentence, it was later commuted to a fine. This decision was influenced, in part, by the remorse demonstrated by the individual during the trial. Additionally, he was prohibited from driving for six months.

== Honours ==
In April 2013, Hassan was named to the Time 100, TIME magazine's annual list of the 100 most influential people in the world. His efforts at advancing national reconciliation, anti-corruption measures, and socio-economic and security sector reforms in Somalia were cited as reasons for the selection.

Some of the state Honours received by Hassan are as under;

Ribbon	Decoration	Country	Date	Note	Ref.
	Hilal-i-Imtiaz	Pakistan	18 August 2015	The second-highest civilian honour of Pakistan.	
	King Hamad Order of the Renaissance	Bahrain	17 January 2016	First Class, the third-highest civilian honour of Bahrain.	
	Order of King Abdulaziz	Saudi Arabia	24 October 2023	First Class, the highest civilian honour of Saudi Arabia awarded to foreign dignitaries.	

== Notes ==
Political offices
Preceded by Mohamed Osman Jawari; Acting	President of Somalia; 2012–2017	Succeeded by Mohamed Abdullahi Mohamed
Preceded by Mohamed Abdullahi Mohamed	President of Somalia; 2022–present	Incumbent
