= Abdi Farah Shirdon =

Somali businessman, economist and politician

Abdi Shirdon عبدي فارح شردون
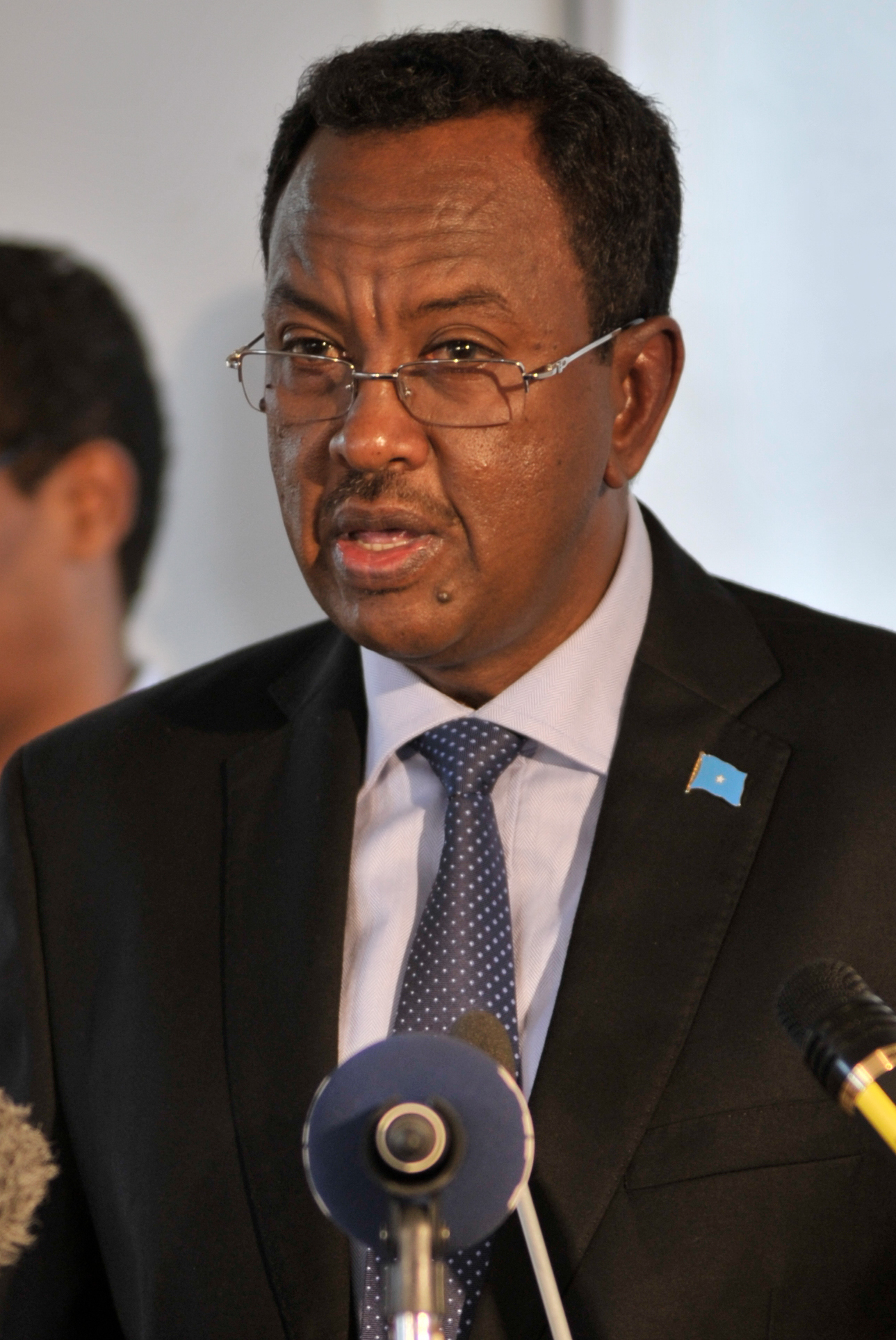

9th Prime Minister of Somalia
- In office 17 October 2012 – 21 December 2013
- President: Hassan Sheikh Mohamud
- Preceded by: Abdiweli Mohamed Ali
- Succeeded by: Abdiweli Sheikh Ahmed

Personal details
- Born: 1958 (age 67–68) Dusmareeb, Somalia
- Party: Independent
- Spouse: Asha Haji Elmi
- Education: Somali National University
- Website: http://abdifarah.org/

Abdi Farah Shirdon (Somali: Cabdi Faarax Shirdoon; Arabic: عبدي فارح شردون; born 1958) is a Somali businessman, economist and politician. He served as the prime minister of Somalia between October 2012 and December 2013. Shirdon is credited with having overseen significant development in social services and the national budget, as well as improving local security.

== Background ==
=== Personal life ===
Shirdon was born in 1958 in Dusmareeb, Somalia. He comes from a middle-class background, and belongs to the Marehan Darod clan.

Shirdon is married to Asha Haji Elmi a prominent peace activist and former Member of the Federal Parliament of Somalia. The couple have four children.

He is also multilingual, speaking Somali, Italian and English.

=== Education ===
After finishing high school, Shirdon relocated to Somalia's capital, Mogadishu, to attend college. He studied at the Somali National University (SNU), where he earned a bachelor's degree in economics, graduating with honours in 1983. Furthering his education Abdi Farah Shirdoon attended the University of Oxford, where he completed his master's degree in diplomatic studies.

=== Early career ===
Shirdon briefly worked as an economist in the national Ministry of Finance and Ministry of Agriculture from 1983 to 1985, during the Siad Barre administration. He subsequently left government to pursue an entrepreneurial career. He established Shirdon International, serving as the company's CEO.

After the civil war broke out in Somalia in 1991, Shirdon moved to Nairobi, Kenya. There, he opened up another business, running a prominent import-export firm.

In March 2012, Shirdon was also named Chairman of the Rajo Forum, a Somali civil society institution he co-founded composed of professionals, intellectuals, businesspeople and politicians.

== Political Comeback (2025–present) ==
In April 2025, Shirdon returned to Mogadishu, marking his re-entry into Somali politics after a prolonged absence from the national stage. Upon arrival at Aden Adde International Airport, he was welcomed by a delegation of lawmakers, former ministers, and supporters. His return was followed by a "meet-the-people" tour aimed at reconnecting with constituents and key stakeholders across the country.

Shortly thereafter, Shirdon officially announced his candidacy for the Somali presidency in the 2026 elections. He also launched a new political party named Nagaad—a Somali term meaning "prosperity" or "abundance"—which he described as a platform for national transformation. His campaign agenda outlined key policy priorities including economic revitalisation, investment in Somalia's human capital, the development of agricultural capacity, and the promotion of the "blue economy" through sustainable use of maritime resources.

Shirdon's re-emergence has drawn attention from political analysts, who view him as a potential contender in what is expected to be a competitive race, possibly involving incumbent President Hassan Sheikh Mohamud, several former presidents, and other former prime ministers.

== Prime Minister of Somalia ==
=== Appointment ===
On 6 October 2012, Shirdon was appointed the new prime minister of Somalia by incumbent President Hassan Sheikh Mohamud. He succeeded Abdiweli Mohamed Ali in office. A close ally of President Mohamud, Shirdon was reportedly chosen for the position due in part to his academic background.

His selection was greeted with rallies of support in several cities across the country, including his hometown of Dhusamareb and Buuhoodle. The autonomous Puntland regional administration in northeastern Somalia also welcomed Shirdon's appointment and indicated that it would partner with the central government to uphold the new federal system of governance.

If endorsed, Shirdon pledged that he would name a competent and cohesive Cabinet with no tolerance for corruption. He also vowed in a statement that he would perform his duties in accordance with the national Constitution.

On 17 October 2012, the Federal Parliament approved Shirdon as prime minister by a large majority, with 215 of 275 legislators endorsing his nomination. UN Special Representative for Somalia Augustine Mahiga welcomed the development, describing it as "further incontrovertible evidence of progress in Somalia". Mahiga also pledged to collaborate with the new Somali government in the post-conflict reconstruction process.

=== Cabinet ===
On 4 November 2012, Shirdon named a new 10 member Cabinet after extensive consultations with local stakeholders. The council of ministers consists of many newcomers, including two women: Fowsiyo Yussuf Haji Aadan as the nation's first female Minister of Foreign Affairs, and Maryam Kassim as Minister of Social Development. The new Cabinet was later endorsed by the legislature on 13 November 2012, with 219 MPs approving the selection, 3 voting against it, and 3 abstaining.

=== Task Force ===
In early February 2013, Prime Minister Shirdon launched an Independent Task Force on Human Rights in order to firm up on the protection of individual rights. The 13-member committee of volunteers was formed after extensive consultations with civil society groups and the Speaker of Parliament, Mohamed Osman Jawari. Chaired by prominent human rights attorney Maryam Yusuf Sheikh Ali, one of four women on the panel, the Task Force includes an educator, a peace activist, leaders of Somali women's organizations, senior police officers, a humanitarian campaigner, a religious leader, and a media representative. It is tasked with investigating allegations of human rights abuses and journalist intimidation. At the end of its three-month mandate, the committee is scheduled to publish a report on its findings and recommended courses of action. The Task Force will eventually give way to a permanent parliamentary Human Rights Commission, which will have the capacity to investigate allegations over a longer period.

=== Listening Tour ===
In February 2013, Prime Minister Shirdon, along with Minister of Defence Abdihakim Mohamoud Haji-Faqi, Minister of Interior Abdikarim Hussein Guled, and Deputy Speaker of Parliament Jaylaani Nur Ikar, embarked on a Listening Tour of various cities across Somalia to meet with the population, establish public service priorities, and facilitate the creation of local administrations. Shirdon pledged that the federal government would deliver public services to the regions, contingent with the formation of effective local government and an acceleration of the reconciliation process. Toward this end, he negotiated an agreement with community leaders in the central Galguduud province to set up a district administration and signed a cooperative security pact with Ahlu Sunna Waljama'a.

=== Counter-terrorism law ===
On 18 April 2013, the Premier's Office announced in a press release that the Somali Council of Ministers had approved draft legislation on a new counter-terrorism law. The bill formalizes proper conduct and structures vis-a-vis the national security and intelligence agencies. It also establishes a legal definition for terrorism, and aims to meet international best practices. According to Prime Minister Shirdon, the law constitutes a key component of his administration's counter-terrorism strategy. It is now expected to be put before the legislature for deliberation and approval.

=== Public Finance Management Policy ===
In May 2013, Prime Minister Shirdon announced that the Somali federal government had launched a new Public Finance Management Policy (PFMP) in order to streamline the public sector's financial system and to strengthen the delivery capacity of the government's financial sector. Endorsed by the Council of Ministers on 2 May, the reform plan is intended to serve as a benchmark for public financial management and the re-establishment of national institutions. The PFMP aims to provide transparent, accurate and timely public sector financial information by ameliorating the national budget process' openness, rendering more efficient and effective public spending, and improving fiscal discipline via both internal and external control. It also sets out to concentrate public expenditure on government priority areas. According to Cabinet members, the policy will cost an estimated $26 million and is expected to be fully implemented over the next fours years.

=== Somali Disaster Management Agency ===
On 30 May 2013, the Federal Government of Somalia announced that the Cabinet had approved draft legislation on a new Somali Disaster Management Agency (SDMA), which had originally been proposed by the Ministry of Interior. According to Prime Minister Shirdon's Media Office, the SDMA will lead and coordinate the government's response to various natural disasters. It is part of a broader effort by the federal authorities to re-establish national institutions. The Federal Parliament is now expected to deliberate on the proposed bill for endorsement after any amendments.

=== Foreign investment law ===
On 10 June 2013, Prime Minister Shirdon signed a new foreign investment law. The draft bill was prepared by the Ministry of Commerce and Industry in conjunction with government attorneys. Approved by the Cabinet, it establishes a secure legal framework for foreign investment. Shirdon welcomed the legislation as an important step toward creating a business-friendly environment. The bill will now be presented to parliament for approval, where Minister of Commerce and Industry, Mohamoud Ahmed Hassan, is slated to field questions from lawmakers. A committee is also set to review the draft law line-by-line and make additional procedural recommendations.

=== Civil aviation law ===
On 13 June 2013, Prime Minister Shirdon's Office announced that the Cabinet had forwarded to parliament a new draft civil aviation law. The bill is part of a larger initiative by the federal authorities to reassume control of Somalia's airspace. According to Abdullahi Ilmoge Hirsi, Minister of Information, Posts and Telecommunications, the law aims to develop national aviation skills. It is also expected to help spur economic growth and facilitate the creation of employment opportunities.

=== Somali National University ===
On 14 November 2013, Shirdon's Cabinet unanimously approved a federal government plan to reopen the Somali National University (SNU), which had closed down in the early 1990s. The SNU had historically served as an expansive institution of higher learning, with 13 departments, 700 staff and over 15,000 students. The refurbishing initiative is expected to cost US$3.6 million, and is part of a broader government effort to re-establish national institutions.

=== Vote of confidence ===
On 6 October 2013, Prime Minister Shirdon announced that he would significantly reshuffle the Council of Ministers in response to speculation regarding his potential resignation. He also highlighted the growth in revenue that the federal government managed to secure under his administration, with monthly proceeds having risen from $2.5 million to $10 million. The following month, President Hassan Sheikh Mohamud asked Shirdon to resign from office on the grounds that Shirdon was allegedly ineffective in the job. Mohamud was reportedly acting on the advice of the State Minister for Presidency, Farah Abdulkadir.

On 12 November 2013, Shirdon confirmed that there was a dispute between himself and the president, but indicated that the row was constitutional rather than political. He also asserted that the matter should be resolved in parliament. According to MP Mohamed Abdi Yusuf, the rift between Shirdon and Mohamud centered over through what constitutional mechanism and by whom the Cabinet was ultimately to be formed. The relevant Articles 90, 100 and 69 of the national constitution address these issues, specifying that the President has the power to appoint the Prime Minister; the Prime Minister, in turn, has the discretionary power to appoint members of the Council of Ministers, who then must be endorsed by the House of the People of the Federal Parliament; and the House of the People of the Federal Parliament likewise has the power to endorse or remove the Prime Minister through a vote of confidence.

On 24 November 2013, 168 MPs endorsed a document submitted to parliament, which outlined a motion against Prime Minister Shirdon's administration. A group of legislators believed to be loyal to Shirdon suggested that the document may not have been properly endorsed, and demanded that the names of the lawmakers who approved the motion be attached to the paper.

On 1 December 2013, 140 MPs voted against a request from Shirdon and the Speaker of the Parliament Mohamed Osman Jawari asking lawmakers to allow Shirdon to appear before the national assembly in order to brief legislators on his government's accomplishments. Shirdon subsequently issued a statement wherein he asserted that the constitution conferred upon him the right to defend himself against the motion, insisting that the proposal was not based on evidence and fair information. He also indicated that his administration had prepared a full response report and that he still wanted an opportunity to address the national assembly. Additionally, Shirdon stated that he would not abide by any decision made in his absence. According to Garowe Online, independent sources in Mogadishu indicated that the motion was being led by former TFG Parliament Speaker Sharif Hassan Sheikh Adan.

On 2 December 2013, a parliamentary vote of confidence was held against Shirdon. Parliament Speaker Jawari subsequently announced that 184 of the present MPs had voted against the Prime Minister, whereas 65 legislators had voted to retain him. On 5 December 2013, Shirdon released a statement confirming that he and his Cabinet accepted the legislature's decision. He also expressed disappointment that he had not been allowed to address parliament, and urged the citizenry to support the incoming administration in order build on the development gains that had been achieved during his tenure. UN Special Representative for Somalia Nicholas Kay paid tribute to the outgoing prime minister, noting that Shirdon had endeavoured to promote growth and progress and was an important principal in establishing the New Deal Compact between Somalia and its international partners. He also commended the legislators on adhering to procedural rules during the vote, and pledged to work constructively with the succeeding administration. On 12 December 2013, President Mohamud named Abdiweli Sheikh Ahmed as the new prime minister.

Political offices
Preceded by Abdiweli Mohamed Ali	Prime Minister of Somalia; 2012–2013	Succeeded by Abdiweli Sheikh Ahmed
