= Nicholas Kay =

British diplomat

Sir Nicholas Kay KCMG
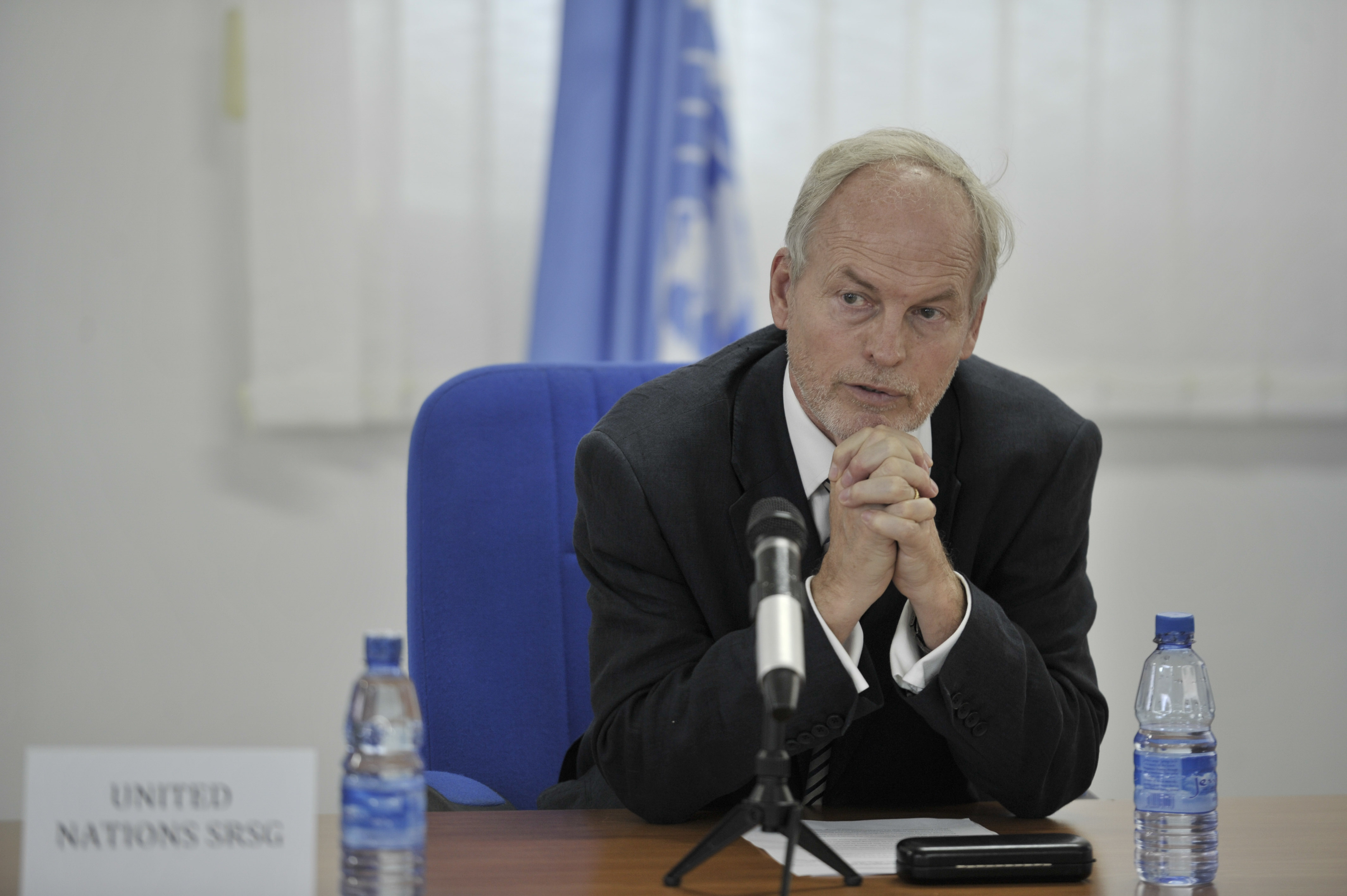

British Ambassador to Afghanistan
- In office 2017–2018
- Monarch: Elizabeth II
- Prime Minister: Theresa May
- Preceded by: Dominic Jermey
- Succeeded by: Giles Lever (chargé d'affaires)

United Nations Special Representative for Somalia
- In office 2013–2016
- Appointed by: Ban Ki-moon
- Preceded by: Augustine Mahiga
- Succeeded by: Michael Keating

British Ambassador to Sudan
- In office 2010–2012
- Monarch: Elizabeth II
- Prime Minister: David Cameron
- Preceded by: Rosalind Marsden
- Succeeded by: Peter Tibber

British Ambassador to the Democratic Republic of the Congo
- In office 2007–2010
- Monarch: Elizabeth II
- Prime Minister: Gordon Brown
- Preceded by: Andrew Sparkes
- Succeeded by: Neil Wigan

Personal details
- Born: 8 March 1958 (age 68) Lincolnshire, United Kingdom
- Children: 3
- Education: Abingdon School
- Alma mater: St Edmund Hall, Oxford (BA); University of Reading (MA)
- Occupation: Diplomat

Sir Nicholas Peter Kay KCMG (born 8 March 1958) is a British diplomat. He has served as the British ambassador to Afghanistan, Sudan and the Democratic Republic of the Congo. From 2013 to 2016 he was the United Nations Special Representative for Somalia.

== Background ==
=== Education ===
Kay was born on 8 March 1958 in Lincolnshire. He was educated at Abingdon School and St Edmund Hall, Oxford, whence he has an BA degree in English language and literature. He also has an MA in applied linguistics from the University of Reading.

=== Early career ===
From 1980 to 1994 Kay was an English language teacher in Cyprus, Saudi Arabia, Peru, Brazil, Spain and the UK. In 1994 he joined the Foreign and Commonwealth Office (FCO). He served as the United Kingdom's Regional Coordinator for Southern Afghanistan and Head of the Provincial Reconstruction Team for Helmand Province from 2006 to 2007, British Ambassador to the Democratic Republic of Congo and Republic of the Congo from 2007 to 2010, British Ambassador to Sudan from 2010 to 2012, and Africa Director at the FCO from 2012 to 2013.

== UN Special Representative ==
=== Appointment ===
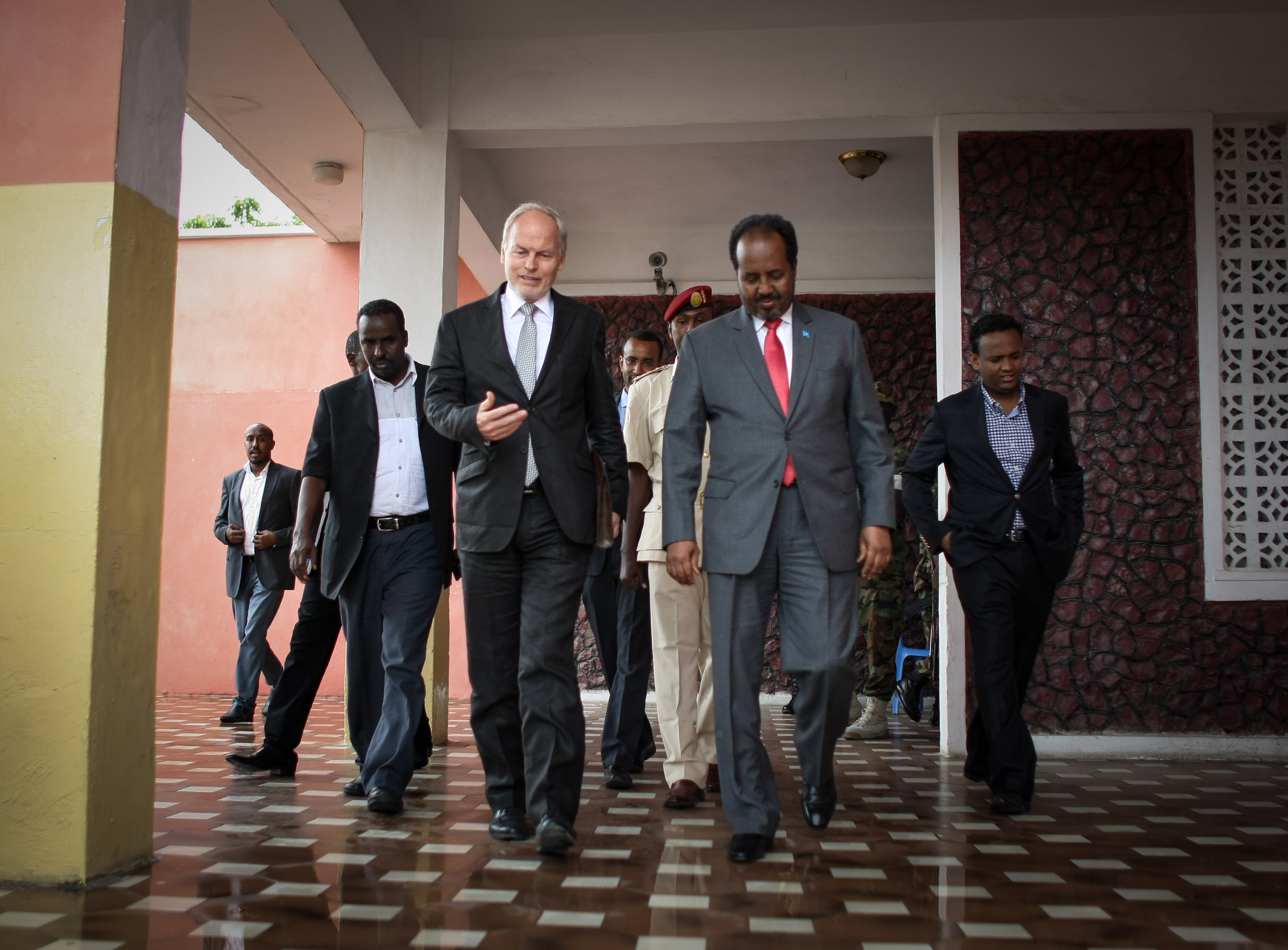
Nicholas Kay with Somali president Hassan Sheikh Mohamud

On 29 April 2013, Kay was appointed by United Nations Secretary-General Ban Ki-moon as the new UN Special Representative for Somalia. He officially replaced Augustine Mahiga at the position on 3 June 2013.

=== Vote of confidence ===
In December 2013, following a parliamentary vote of confidence, Kay paid tribute to the outgoing prime minister Abdi Farah Shirdon, noting that Shirdon had endeavoured to promote growth and progress and was an important principal in establishing the New Deal Compact between Somalia and its international partners. He also commended the legislators on adhering to procedural rules during the vote, and pledged to work constructively with the succeeding administration. Following the appointment of Abdiweli Sheikh Ahmed as the new premier, Kay congratulated Ahmed on his appointment and pledged to continue supporting the Federal Government's peace and state-building efforts.

=== Somalia-UN cooperative agreement ===
On 26 February 2014, Kay and Somalia's Minister of Foreign Affairs Abdirahman Duale Beyle signed a bilateral agreement outlining the terms of future cooperation between the United Nations and the Somali federal government. According to Beyle, the pact came after extensive consultations between both parties. Along with attorneys, President Hassan Sheikh Mohamud attended the signing of the agreement, which he commended for helping to strengthen cooperation between the Somali authorities and the UN.

=== Jubaland agreement ===
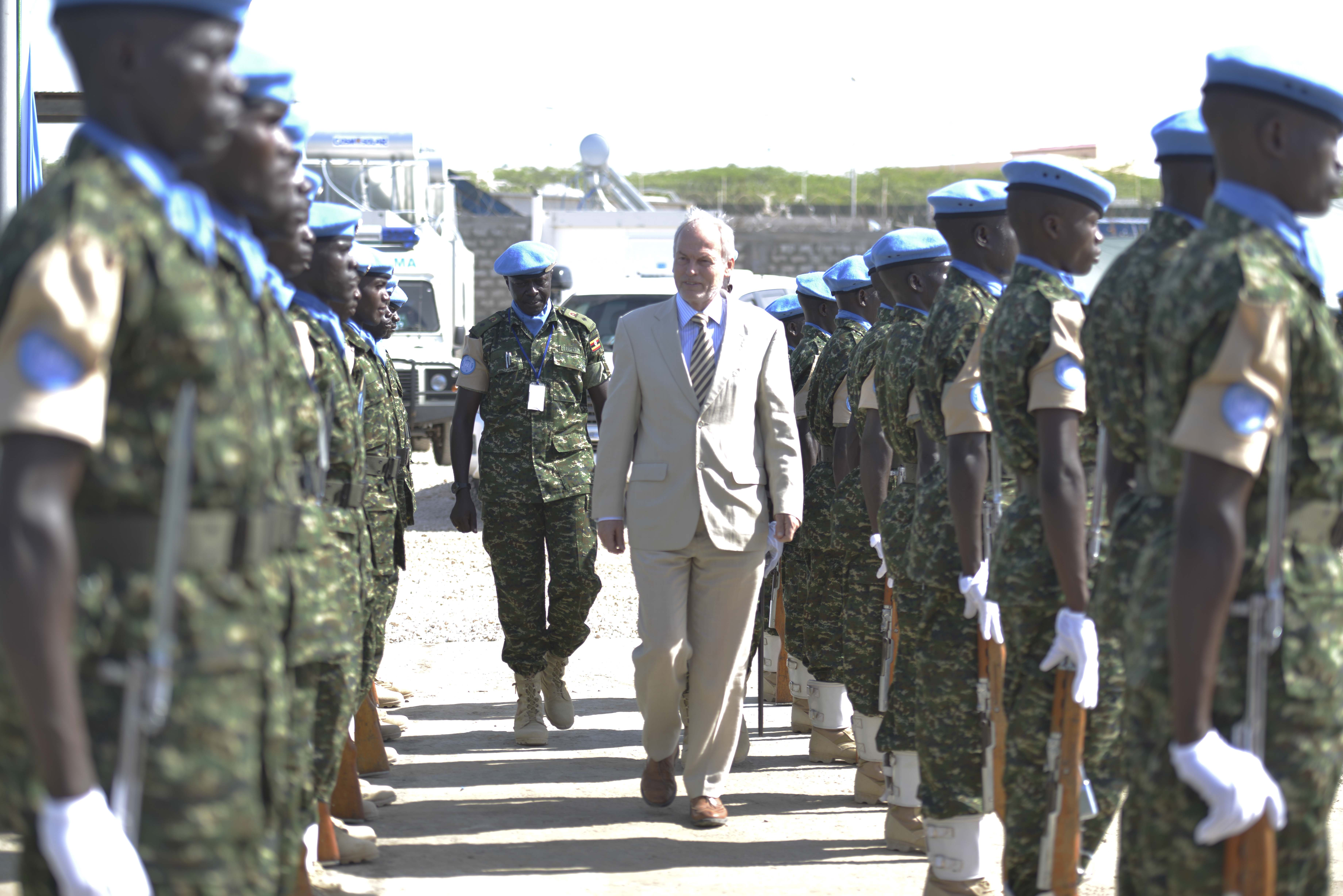
Kay inspecting the guard of honour during the inauguration of the United Nations Guard Unit in Somalia

In August 2013, the autonomous Jubaland administration signed a national reconciliation agreement in Addis Ababa with the Somali federal government. Endorsed by the federal State Minister for the Presidency Farah Abdulkadir on behalf of President Hassan Sheikh Mohamud, the pact was brokered by the Foreign Ministry of Ethiopia and came after protracted bilateral talks. Under the terms of the agreement, Jubaland will be administered for a two-year period by a Juba Interim Administration and led by the region's incumbent president, Ahmed Mohamed Islam. The regional president will serve as the chairperson of a new Executive Council, to which he will appoint three deputies. Management of Kismayo's seaport and airport will also be transferred to the Federal Government after a period of six months, and revenues and resources generated from these infrastructures will be earmarked for Jubaland's service delivery and security sectors as well as local institutional development. Additionally, the agreement includes the integration of Jubaland's military forces under the central command of the Somali National Army (SNA), and stipulates that the Juba Interim Administration will command the regional police. UN Special Envoy to Somalia Ambassador Kay hailed the pact as "a breakthrough that unlocks the door for a better future for Somalia," with AUC, UN, EU and IGAD representatives also present at the signing.

=== Garowe bilateral agreement ===
In October 2014, Prime Minister of Somalia Abdiweli Sheikh Ahmed led a federal government delegation to the autonomous Puntland region in northeastern Somalia. The delegates included Second Speaker of the Federal Parliament Mahad Abdalle Awad and Minister of Education Ahmed Mohamed Gurase, among other Cabinet members. They were received at the Garowe International Airport by senior Puntland leaders, including President Abdiweli Mohamed Ali and Vice President Abdihakim Abdullahi Haji Omar, and subsequently attended a well-organized welcoming ceremony at the Puntland presidential palace in Garowe alongside Ambassador Kay and various other members of the international community. Ahmed subsequently co-chaired a reconciliation conference in the city between the visiting federal officials and Puntland representatives led by President Ali.

The three-day meeting concluded with a 12-point agreement between the stakeholders, with UN envoy to Somalia Ambassador Kay, EU Ambassador Michele Cervone d'Urso, IGAD representative Mohamed Abdi Afey, and Ethiopian Consul General Asmalash Woldamirat serving as witnesses. According to federal Minister of Culture and Higher Education Duale Adan Mohamed, the pact stipulates that the recent tripartite agreement between Galmudug and Himan and Heeb establishing a new central regional state within Somalia only applies to the Galguduud and south Mudug provinces. In keeping with a 2013 pact signed by former prime minister of Somalia Abdi Farah Shirdon and former Puntland President Abdirahman Mohamed Farole, the Garowe bilateral agreement also states that the Federal and Puntland authorities will work together to form a united and inclusive national army. Additionally, parliamentary committees consisting of Federal and Puntland representatives are mandated with ensuring equitable distribution of foreign assistance and overseeing eventual talks pertaining to the Provisional Constitution. Ambassador Kay welcomed the agreement and urged both parties to work for the public interest, and IGAD representative Afey likewise hailed the reconciliation effort.

=== Benadir-UN bilateral cooperation ===
In November 2014, Ambassador Kay met with Mayor of Mogadishu Hassan Mohamed Hussein in the capital. The two officials discussed a number of bilateral issues, including strengthening municipal security, training local government forces, and engaging the indigent. Hussein also indicated that he and Kay agreed to accelerate ties between the Benadir administration and the UN. Additionally, Kay applauded Hussein for pledging to hold fair city elections.

Already Companion of the Order of St Michael and St George (CMG), Kay was appointed Knight Commander of the Order of St Michael and St George (KCMG) in the 2016 Birthday Honours "for services to diplomacy and to international peace and security."

Kay was replaced as Special Representative for Somalia at the end of 2015.

== After Somalia ==
Kay was the UK's Special Envoy to the Horn of Africa 2016–17, then was appointed ambassador to Afghanistan in July 2017. He took up the post on 21 August 2017. In December 2018 he left the post of ambassador after being appointed to be NATO Senior Civilian Representative in Afghanistan from March 2019.

== Personal life ==
Kay is married to Susan Ruth Wallace and has one son and two daughters.

== See also ==
- List of Old Abingdonians

Diplomatic posts
Preceded by Andrew Sparkes	British Ambassador to the Democratic Republic of the Congo; 2007–2010	Succeeded by Neil Wigan
Preceded by Rosalind Marsden	British Ambassador to Sudan; 2010–2012	Succeeded by Peter Tibber
Preceded by Tim Hitchens	Africa Director of the Foreign and Commonwealth Office; 2012–2013	Succeeded by Nicholas Hailey
Preceded by Augustine Mahiga	United Nations Special Representative for Somalia; 2013–2016	Succeeded by Michael Keating
Preceded by	UK Special Envoy to the Horn of Africa; 2016–2017	Succeeded by
Preceded by Dominic Jermey	British Ambassador to Afghanistan; 2017–2018	Succeeded by Giles Lever (chargé d'affaires)
