= Ridwan Hirsi Mohamed =

Somali politician

Ridwan Hirsi Mohamed رضوان حرسي محمد

Deputy Prime Minister of Somalia
- In office 17 January 2014 – 27 February 2015
- Prime Minister: Abdiweli Sheikh Ahmed
- Preceded by: Fowsiyo Yusuf Haji Adan
- Succeeded by: Mohamed Omar Arte

Minister of Religious Affairs
- In office 17 January 2014 – 6 February 2015
- Prime Minister: Abdiweli Sheikh Ahmed
- Succeeded by: Abdulkadir Sheikh Ali Baghdadi

Member of Somali Parliament
- Incumbent
- Assumed office 20 August 2012

Personal details
- Born: Mogadishu, Somalia
- Party: Peace and Development Party

Ridwan Hirsi Mohamed (Somali: Ridwaan Xirsi Maxamed, Arabic: رضوان حرسي محمد) is a Somali politician. He is the former Minister of Religious Affairs and former deputy Prime-minister of Somalia. He hails from the Rer Ainanshe sub-division of the Habr Yunis Garhajis clan.

== Deputy Prime Minister of Somalia ==
=== Appointment ===
On 17 January 2014, Mohamed was appointed to the newly formed post of Minister of Religious Affairs by. Mohamed was also concurrently named Deputy Prime Minister of Somalia. He succeeded Fowsiyo Yusuf Haji Adan in the latter position.

=== Hussein national funeral committee ===
On 1 February 2014, Mohamed was appointed chair of a governmental committee tasked with organizing a national funeral for the late Prime Minister of Somalia, Abdirizak Haji Hussein, who had died on 31 January 2014.

=== Illicit weapons bill ===
In August 2014, Mohamed chaired a Cabinet meeting during which the federal ministers discussed a bill aimed at outlawing the trade and possession of illegal weapons in Somalia. The proposed legislation was part of a larger security sector reform. Cabinet ministers unanimously passed the new law, which is now slated to be brought before parliament for deliberation.

=== Ministry of Culture and Higher Education office ===
In September 2014, the Somali federal government reopened the Ministry of Culture and Higher Education building at an official ceremony in Mogadishu. The event was chaired by Deputy Prime Minister and Minister for Religious Affairs Mohamed, and was attended by representatives from various universities, parliamentarians, diplomats, educators, parents, and patriotic singers. Minister of Culture and Higher Education Duale Adan Mohamed outlined therein his ministry's efforts at rehabilitating the compound, which had been non-operational for over twenty years. Additionally, Mohamed described the reopening of the office as a major accomplishment for the government and wider society, and thanked Duale's ministry for its renovation work.

=== Population census ===
In September 2014, the Ministry of Planning and International Cooperation published a preliminary population census for Somalia. It is the first such governmental initiative in over two decades. The UNFPA assisted the Ministry in the project, which is slated to be finalized ahead of the planned plebiscite and local and national elections in 2016. According to Deputy Prime Minister Somalia Ridwan Hirsi Mohamed and Minister of Planning Said Abdullahi Mohamed, the census will facilitate the implementation of Vision 2016 and general development projects in the country. The Ministry of Planning also indicated that the preliminary census data suggests that there are around 12,360,000 residents in the nation, and that it plans to conduct a census of Somali expatriates.
