= Khalid Omar Ali =

Somali politician

Khalid Omar خالد عمر علي

State Minister of Interior of Somalia
- Incumbent
- Assumed office 12 January 2015
- President: Hassan Sheikh Mohamud
- Prime Minister: Omar Abdirashid Ali Sharmarke

Minister of Youth and Sports
- In office 17 January 2014 – 12 January 2015
- President: Hassan Sheikh Mohamud
- Prime Minister: Abdiweli Sheikh Ahmed
- Preceded by: Maryam Qaasim
- Succeeded by: Duale Adan Mohamed

Personal details
- Born: Somalia

Khalid Omar Ali (Somali: Khalid Cumar Cali, Arabic: خالد عمر علي) is a Somali politician. He served as the Minister of Youth and Sports of Somalia under Prime Minister Abdiweli Sheikh Ahmed. Khalid Omar Ali succeeded Maryam Qaasim when her post as Minister for Human Development and Public Services ended on 17 January 2014. The Ministry was split to allow the creation of 6 cabinet positions one of which was the Ministry of Youth and Sports. The other 5 cabinet positions are Ministry of Health, Ministry of Culture and Higher Education, Ministry of Labour and Social Affairs, Ministry of Women and Human Rights, Ministry of Education. On 12 January 2015, Khalid Omar Ali was succeeded by Duale Adan Mohamed and instead was appointed the new State Minister for Interior of Somalia by Prime Minister Omar Abdirashid Ali Sharmarke.

Khalid Omar succeeded Maryam Qaasim when her post as Minister for Human Development and Public Services ended on 17 January 2014. The Ministry was split to allow the creation of 6 cabinet positions one of which was the Ministry of Youth and Sports. The other 5 cabinet positions are Ministry of Health, Ministry of Culture and Higher Education, Ministry of Labour and Social Affairs, Ministry of Women and Human Rights, Ministry of Education. On 12 January 2015, Khalid Omar Ali was succeeded by Duale Adan Mohamed and instead was appointed the new State Minister for Interior of Somalia by Prime Minister Omar Abdirashid Ali Sharmarke.
