= Mohamed Ali Haga =

Somali politician

State Minister of Defence of Somalia
- Incumbent
- Assumed office 17 January 2014
- Prime Minister: Abdiweli Sheikh Ahmed

Personal details
- Born: 1966 (age 59–60) Togdhere Somalia

Mohamed Ali Haga is a Somali politician. He is the State Minister of Defence of Somalia, having been appointed to the position on 17 January 2014 by Prime Minister Abdiweli Sheikh Ahmed.
