= Fawzia Yusuf Adam =

Somali politician

Fawzia Yusuf H. Adam
- فوزية يوسف الحاج أدم
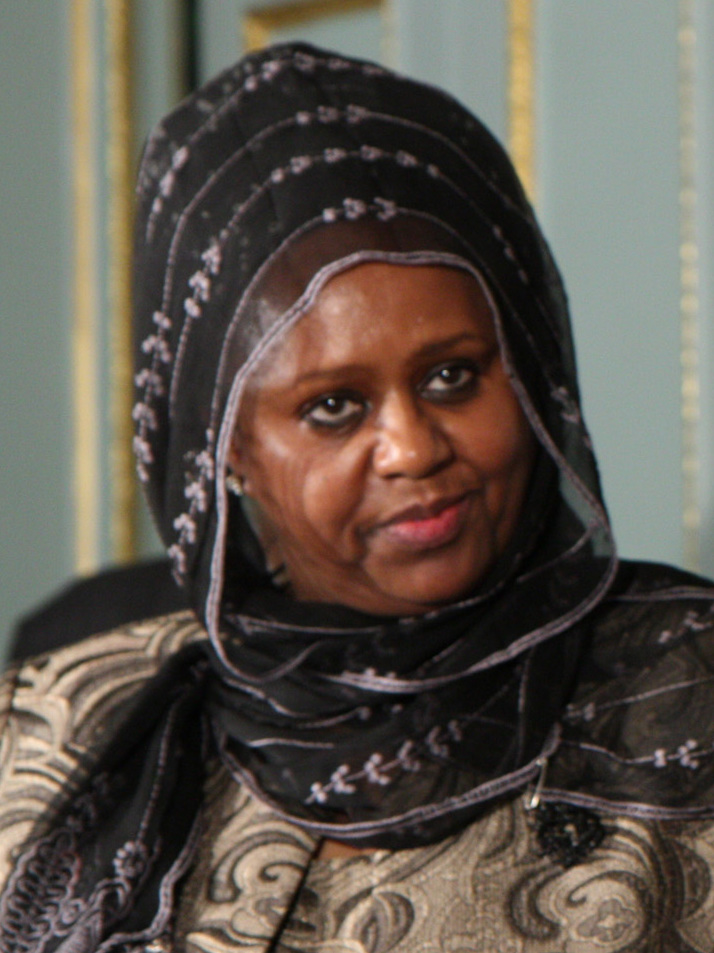
- Adam in 2013

Foreign Minister of Somalia
- In office 4 November 2012 – 17 January 2014
- Prime Minister: Abdi Farah Shirdon
- Preceded by: Abdullahi Haji Hassan Mohamed Nuur
- Succeeded by: Abdirahman Duale Beyle

Deputy Prime Minister of Somalia
- In office 4 November 2012 – 17 January 2014
- Prime Minister: Abdi Farah Shirdon
- Preceded by: Hussein Arab Isse
- Succeeded by: Ridwan Hirsi Mohamed

Personal details
- Born: Hargeisa, Somalia
- Party: National Democratic Party

Fawzia Yusuf Haji Adam (Somali: Fawzia Yusuf H. Adam, Arabic: فوزية يوسف الحاج أدم) is a Somali politician. From 4 November 2012 to 17 January 2014, she served as the Minister of Foreign Affairs and Deputy Prime Minister of Somalia. In January 2024, she was nominated by Somalia for the position of the Chairperson of the African Union Commission.

== Career ==
=== Appointment ===
On 4 November 2012, Adam was named Foreign Minister and deputy Prime Minister of Somalia by Prime Minister Abdi Farah Shirdon. She is the first woman to have been selected for the position. Adan was also appointed Deputy Prime Minister.

=== Asset recovery ===
In November 2012, the Somali federal authorities issued an official request to the United Nations Security Council for assistance in recovering public assets and funds that were being held abroad. The state properties had been frozen by foreign administrations, institutions and firms after the collapse of Somalia's central government in 1991 in order to prevent unauthorized use. In January 2013, Adan and other members of Somalia's reconstituted Cabinet began a formal assessment and recovery process of Somali national assets, which include ships and planes that are believed to be held in Italy, Germany and Yemen.

=== Memorandum of Understanding ===
In late May 2013, Adan and Foreign Minister of the United Arab Emirates Sheikh Abdullah bin Zayed Al Nahyan signed a Memorandum of Understanding on bilateral cooperation. The agreement re-establishes formal diplomatic ties between Somalia and the UAE, and also focuses on the political, security, economic, investment and development sectors. Additionally, the Emirati government announced that it would re-open its embassy in Mogadishu.

=== Cooperation agreement ===
In August 2013, follow a meeting with Chinese Vice Premier Wang Yang, Adan announced that the Somali authorities looked forward to cooperation with the Chinese government in the energy, infrastructure, national security and agriculture sectors, among others. Wang also praised the traditional friendship between both nations and re-affirmed China's commitment to the Somali peace process. In September 2013, both governments signed an official cooperation agreement in Mogadishu as part of a five-year national recovery plan in Somalia. The pact will see the Chinese authorities reconstruct several major infrastructural landmarks in the Somali capital and elsewhere, including the National Theatre, a hospital, and the Mogadishu Stadium. Additionally, Chinese ambassador Liu Guangyoun indicated that China would re-open its embassy in Mogadishu on land that had been donated for the purpose by the Somali government.

=== End of term ===
Adan's term as Somalia's Minister of Foreign Affairs and Deputy Prime Minister ended on 17 January 2014, when new Prime Minister Abdiweli Sheikh Ahmed appointed Abdirahman Duale Beyle as Minister of Foreign Affairs and Ridwan Hirsi Mohamed as Deputy Prime Minister.

=== 2022 presidential election ===
Adam is running for the presidency of Somalia in the 2022 Somali presidential election.
