= Samatar =

Samatar is a Somali language surname.

== People with the surname ==
- Abdi Ismail Samatar (born 1950), Somali scholar, writer and professor of geography
- Hasan Adan Samatar (born 1953), Somali singer and guitarist
- Hawa Abdi Samatar (born 19??), Somali political figure
- Hussein Samatar (1964–2013), Somali-American politician, banker and community organizer
- Mohammad Ali Samatar (1931–2016), Somali politician and Lieutenant General
- Sahra Mohamed Ali Samatar (born 19??), Somali politician
- Said Sheikh Samatar (1943–2015), Somali scholar and writer
- Sofia Samatar (born 1971), Somali American educator, poet and writer

== Places ==
- Samatar Crossing, a shared-use path in Minneapolis, Minnesota, United States
