= Ministry of Humanitarianism (Somalia) =

Government ministry of Somalia (2012–2022)

Ministry of humanitarianism
- Coat of arms of Somalia

Agency overview
- Formed: 2012
- Dissolved: 2022
- Jurisdiction: Somalia
- Headquarters: Mogadishu
- Agency executive: Khadija Mohammed Dirie (2022) last holder, Minister of Humanitarianism
- Parent agency: Cabinet of Somalia

The Ministry of Humanitarianism is a ministry responsible for disaster management and humanitarianism. The first hold Minister of Humanitarianism affairs was Maryam Qaasim from 29 March 2017 to 15 November 2017 during Hassan Ali Khaire primership later. later Qassim was succeeded by Hamza Ahmed Hamza, LaterKhadija Mohamed Dirie served 19 October 2020 to 2 August 2022 in Prime Minister Mohamed Hussein Roble's cabinet, after appointing Prime Minister Hamza Abdi Barre who succeeded him, did not appoint anyone to the ministry. However, President Hassan Sheikh Mohamud appointed Abdirahman Abdishakur Warsame as his special envoy for humanitarian affairs. The ministry was abolished in 2022 and its responsibilities taken over by the Somali Disaster Management Agency.

== See also ==
- Agriculture in Somalia
