= Tayo Political Party =

Somali liberal political party

Tayo Political Party Xisbiga Siyaasadda ee Tayo
- Abbreviation: TPP
- Chairperson: Maryam Qasim
- Secretary-General: Mohamed Abdullahi Farmajo
- Founder: Mohamed Abdullahi Farmajo
- Founded: 2012; 14 years ago
- Headquarters: Mogadishu
- Ideology: Civic nationalism; Economic liberalism; Green liberalism; Progressivism; Secular liberalism; Social liberalism
- Political position: Centre
- Colours: Light blue
- Slogan: Tayo, Talo-Wadaag iyo Tubta Toosan (“Quality, Advice and Straightforwardness”)

The Tayo Political Party (TPP; Somali: Xisbiga Siyaasadda ee Tayo, lit. 'Quality Political Party'), often referred to as Tayo, is a liberal political party in Somalia founded in 2012.

== History ==
=== Establishment ===
The Tayo Political Party was established in early 2012 by former Somali Prime Minister Mohamed Abdullahi Mohamed, commonly known as Farmaajo, along with members of his former cabinet. The party's name, Tayo—which means "quality" in Somali—was intended to reflect the generally positive reputation of Farmaajo's brief premiership between 2010 and 2011.

Farmaajo ran in the 2012 Somali presidential election, where he placed seventh on the first round.

=== Ruling party ===
In the 2017 Somali presidential election, Farmaajo was elected President of Somalia by the Federal Parliament, marking the rise of Tayo as the de facto ruling party. Several Tayo members were appointed to key positions in government, including Maryam Qaasim, the party's chairperson, who became the Minister of Humanitarian and Disaster Management.

Farmaajo sought re-election in the 2022 presidential election but was defeated in the third round of voting by former president Hassan Sheikh Mohamud, leader of the opposition Union for Peace and Development Party.

== Electoral history ==
=== Presidential elections ===
Election	Candidate	First round		Second round		Third round		Result
Election	Candidate	Votes	%	Votes	%	Votes	%	Result
2012	Mohamed Abdullahi Mohamed	14	5.19	–	–	–	–	Lost ✗
2017	Mohamed Abdullahi Mohamed	72	22.02	184	56.44	–	–	Won ✓
2022	Mohamed Abdullahi Mohamed	59	18.32	83	25.70	110	33.95	Lost ✗
