= Jama Ahmed Mohamed =

Minister of Energy and Water of Somalia
- Incumbent
- Assumed office 17 January 2014
- Prime Minister: Abdiweli Sheikh Ahmed

Jama Ahmed Mohamed is a Somali politician. He is the Minister of Energy and Water of Somalia, having been appointed to the position on 17 January 2014 by Prime Minister Abdiweli Sheikh Ahmed.
