= Maryam Qaasim =

Somali politician

Maryam Qaasim MP
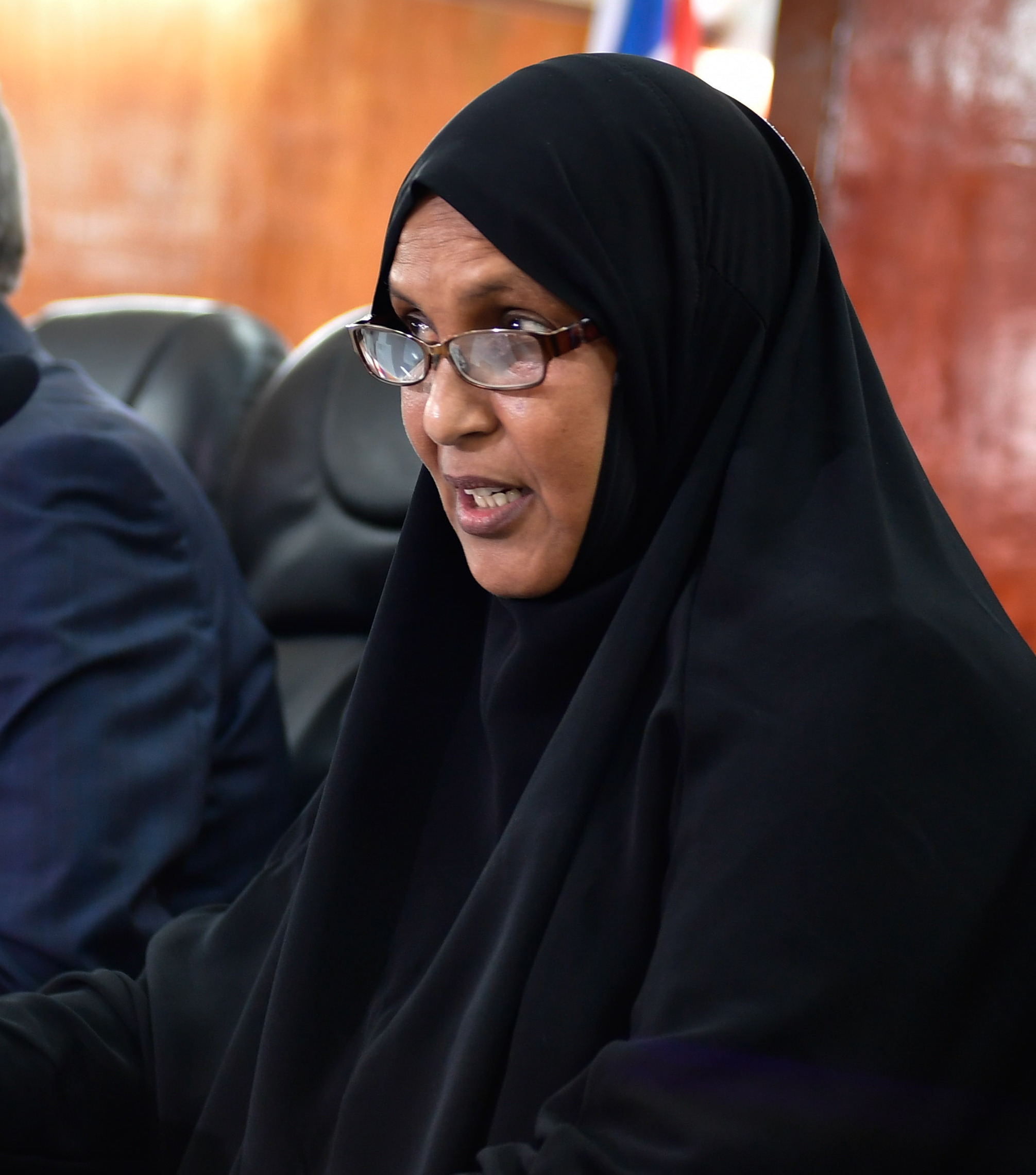
- Qaasim in 2017

Minister of Humanitarian and Disaster Management
- In office 29 March 2017 – 15 November 2017
- President: Mohamed Abdullahi Mohamed
- Prime Minister: Hassan Ali Khaire
- Preceded by: Position established
- Succeeded by: Hamza Ahmed Hamza

Chairperson of Tayo Political Party
- Incumbent
- Assumed office 2 April 2012
- Preceded by: Position established

Minister for Human Development and Public Services of Somalia
- In office 4 November 2012 – 17 January 2014
- President: Hassan Sheikh Mohamud
- Prime Minister: Abdi Farah Shirdon
- Succeeded by: Ahmed Mohamed Gurase; Duale Adan Mohamed; Ahmed Mohamed Mohamud; Lugman Ismail Ali; Khadijo Mohamed Diriye; Khalid Omar Ali

Personal details
- Party: Tayo Political Party

Maryam Qaasim (Somali: Maryam Qaasim Axmed, Arabic: مريم قاسم) is a Somali politician. She served as the Minister for Human Development and Public Services of Somalia from November 2012 to January 2014. She is also the Chairperson of the Tayo Political Party. On 21 March 2017, she was appointed as the Minister of Humanitarian and Disaster Management by the Prime Minister Hassan Ali Khaire.

== Background ==
Qaasim was born to a family from the Barwani (Bravanese) clan.

She is a medical doctor by training. Qaasim previously served as an obstetrician and gynaecologist, living and working in various places, including Somalia, Yemen, the Netherlands and the United Kingdom.

Additionally, she was a university lecturer.

== Political career ==
=== Transitional Federal Government ===
In a political capacity, Qaasim in 2010 acted as the Minister of Women's Development and Family Affairs in the Transitional Federal Government. She was a key part of Prime Minister Mohamed Abdullahi Mohamed (Farmajo)'s Cabinet.

=== Tayo ===
On 2 April 2012, Qaasim was elected the Chairperson of the Tayo Political Party (TPP). It is a Mogadishu-based political association that Farmajo had founded.

=== Federal Government of Somalia ===
==== Appointment ====
On 4 November 2012, she was named Minister of Social Development in the Federal Government of Somalia by Prime Minister Abdi Farah Shirdon. Officially termed the Minister for Human Development and Public Services, Qaasim's portfolio combines the Education, Health, Labour, Youth & Sports and Women & Social Affairs dockets.

==== Health Sector Strategic Plans ====
In March 2013, the federal government under Minister of Health Qaasim launched the Health Sector Strategic Plans (HSSPs) for each of Somalia's constituent zones. The new national health system aims to provide universal basic healthcare to all citizens by 2016. While the government's institutional capacity is developing, UN agencies would in the interim through public-private partnerships administer immunization among other associated health programs. The HSSPs are valued at $350 USD million in total, with between 70%-75% earmarked for health services. Once finalized, the new national healthcare system is expected to ameliorate human capital in the health sector, as well as improve funding for health programs and overall health infrastructure.

==== End of term ====
Qaasim's term as Minister for Human Development and Public Services ended on 17 January 2014, when the Ministry was split to allow the creation of 6 cabinet positions. She was succeeded in these roles by Ahmed Mohamed Gurase as Minister of Education, Duale Adan Mohamed as Minister of Culture and Higher Education, Ahmed Mohamed Mohamud as Minister of Health, Lugman Ismail Ali as Minister of Labour and Social Affairs, Khadijo Mohamed Diriye as Minister of Women and Human Rights, and Khalid Omar Ali as Minister of Sports and Youth.

==== Minister of Humanitarian and Disaster Management ====
On the 21 March 2017, Prime Minister Hassan Ali Khaire announced that Dr.Maryan Qasim would hold the newly created post of Minister of Humanitarian and Disaster Management.
