= Khadijo Mohamed Diriye =

Somali politician (1964–2023)

- خديجة محمد ديري
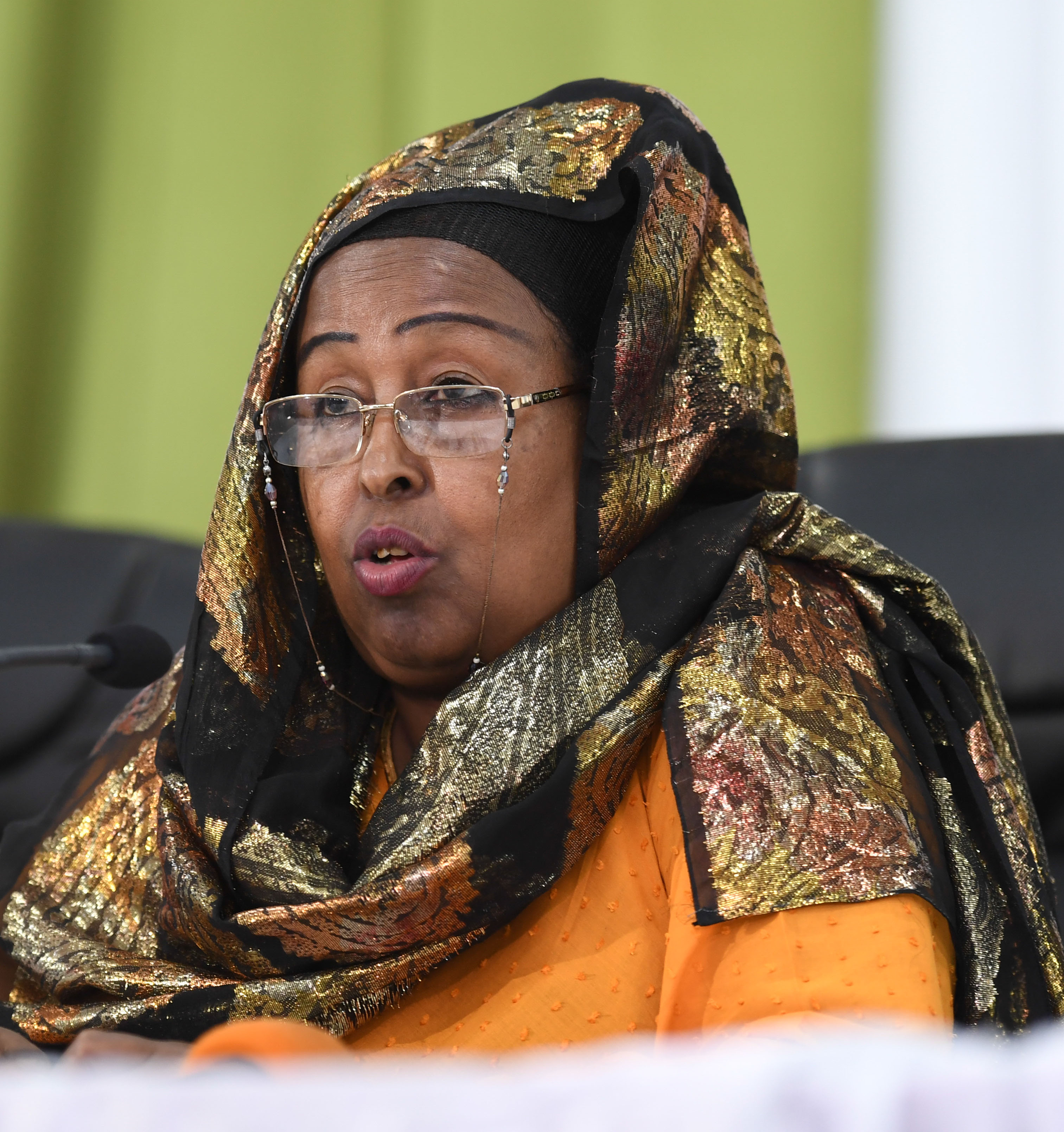
- Diriye in 2017

Minister of Youth and Sports
- In office 21 March 2017 – 26 July 2020
- Prime Minister: Hassan Ali Khaire
- Preceded by: Hussein Nuh
- Succeeded by: Mohamed Bare Mohamud

Minister of Women and Human Rights
- In office 17 January 2014 – 27 January 2015
- Prime Minister: Abdiweli Sheikh Ahmed
- Preceded by: Maryam Qaasim
- Succeeded by: Sahra Mohamed Ali Samatar

Personal details
- Born: 2 April 1964 Balad, British-occupied Somaliland
- Died: 20 December 2023 (aged 59) Djibouti
- Party: Independent

Khadijo Mohamed Diriye (Somali: Khadiijo Maxamed Diiriye, Arabic: خديجة محمد ديري; 2 April 1964 – 20 December 2023) was a Somali politician. From January 2014 to January 2015, she served as the Minister of Women and Human Rights of Somalia. As of March 2017, she served as the Minister of Youth and Sports in the Cabinet of Prime Minister Hassan Ali Khaire.

== Minister of Women and Human Rights ==
=== Appointment ===
On 17 January 2014, Diriye was appointed Minister of Women and Human Rights by Prime Minister of Somalia Abdiweli Sheikh Ahmed. She succeeded Maryam Qassim in the position.

=== London summit ===
In June 2014, Diriye attended a global summit on women in London on behalf of the Federal Government of Somalia. She took the opportunity to showcase the Somali government's new national action plan against sexual violence. The initiative was launched in conjunction with Somalia's constituent regional administrations and local civil society groups.

=== National Action Plan ===
In August 2014, Diriye announced that the Ministry of Women and Human Rights had completed a new national action plan on human rights. To this end, she indicated that her office was finalizing a National Child Protection Policy, with AMISOM providing support. The Somali authorities were also in the process of synchronizing the country's laws with regional and international human rights instruments and conventions. Additionally, Diriye stated that the Somali federal government would ratify the African Charter on the Rights and Welfare of the Child.

As part of the initiative, the Ministry of Women and Human Rights in December 2014 organized a public awareness campaign in Mogadishu on the importance of human rights and how citizens can ensure their protection. It also completed legislation on a new Human Rights Commission bill.

==== End of term ====
On 27 January 2015, Diriye's term as Minister of Women and Human Rights of Somalia ended, following the appointment of a new Cabinet by Prime Minister Omar Abdirashid Ali Sharmarke. She was succeeded at the position by Sahra Mohamed Ali Samatar.

== Death ==
Diriye died in Djibouti on 20 December 2023, at the age of 59.
