= Abdihakim Abdullahi Haji Omar =

Vice President of Puntland from 2014 to 2019

- Cabdihakiin Cabdullaahi Xaaji Cumar Camey عبد الحكيم عبد الله حاجي عمر عمي
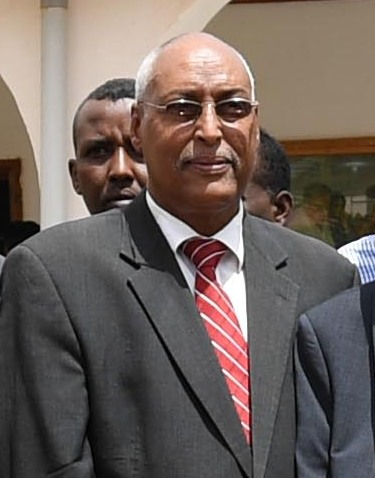
- Abdihakim Amey in Garowe (2017)

5th Vice President of Puntland
- In office 8 January 2014 – 8 January 2019
- President: Abdiweli Gaas
- Preceded by: Abdisamad Ali Shire
- Succeeded by: Ahmed Elmi Osman

Somalia Ambassador to Ethiopia
- In office 7 April 2019 – 4 June 2021

Personal details
- Born: September 19, 1965 (age 60–61) Buuhoodle, Cayn
- Party: Independent

Abdihakim Abdullahi Haji Omar (Somali: Cabdihakiin Cabdulaahi Xaaji Cumar Camey; b. September 19, 1965, Arabic: عبد الحكيم عبد الله حاجي عمر عمي) AKA Abdihakin Amey, is a former Vice President of Puntland from 8 January 2014 to 8 January 2019 and was replaced by Ahmed Elmi Osman.

== Personal life ==
He was the first vice-president of Puntland from the Ararsame clan, specifically from the Reer Hagar sub lineage of the Farah Garad branch of the Dhulbahante clan. His grandfather Omar Camey was assassinated in 1943 in Burao alongside two other Ararsame men, Ahmed Cige and Haybe Kaar by Habar Yunis clan militants. Omar Camey was the chief Caaqil, i.e. caaqil guud of the Ararsame at the time in the colonial era. Omar's family continues to have influence in their sub lineage and the town they are from as his uncle, Mohamoud Haji Omar Amey (Maxamuud Xaaji Cumar Camey) was the chairman of the local elders’ council in the city of Buuhoodle.

Abdihakim lived in Eden Prairie, Minnesota prior to becoming the Vice President of Puntland in 2014.

== Vice President of Puntland ==
=== Election ===
Omar is a newcomer to politics. In 2013–2014, he ran for Vice President of the autonomous Puntland state in northeastern Somalia during the region's 2014 elections. He was declared the winner on 8 January 2014

Omar made his first official trip as Puntland Vice President on 17 January 2014, when he visited Galkayo in the north-central Mudug province. Accompanied by state government officials and elders, the delegation was welcomed at a public gathering at the Abdullahi Yusuf International Airport (Galkayo Airport) by the provincial authorities, representatives of women's groups, and local elders. Omar is also scheduled to visit Kismayo in the southern Lower Juba province.

On 25 January 2014, Puntland Vice President Omar and President Abdiweli Mohamed Ali were officially inaugurated into office at a ceremony at the state capital Garowe. The event was attended by a number of dignitaries, including former Puntland Presidents Abdirahman Mohamud Farole and Mohamud Muse Hersi, Jubaland President Ahmed Mohamed Islam (Madobe), Galmudug President Abdi Hasan Awale Qeybdiid, former Prime Minister of Somalia Ali Mohammed Ghedi, federal MPs, ambassadors from Djibouti, Ethiopia and Turkey, UN Special Representative for Somalia Nicholas Kay, members of the Somali expatriate community and Puntland public, and US, AU and IGAD representatives.

=== Immunization campaign ===
On 1 March 2014, Vice President Omar helped launch a mass vaccination campaign in Puntland for children under the age of five. The initiative was inaugurated at an official function in Garowe attended by Omar, Health Minister Dr. Sadik Enow, WHO officials and local parents. According to Health Ministry Director-General Dr. Abdirizak Hirsi Hassan, the campaign will see 270,000 children and mothers in the region immunized against measles, polio, and seven other terminal diseases. It is scheduled to last five days, during which 4,000 vaccinators will conduct door-to-door medical and vaccine exercises across Puntland's constituent provinces. Omar concluded the launching ceremony by administering the first vaccination drops, and pledged to ameliorate the region's health sector.

=== Rural road infrastructure development ===
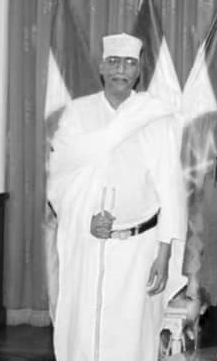
Abdihakim Amey wearing the traditional Somali dress

In May 2014, Vice President Omar led a Puntland delegation on a two-day visit to the coastal town of Eyl. The officials were received by the Puntland Deputy Minister of Public Works and Housing Abdirahman Dijana and the Governor of the Nugal region Abdiqani Hashi Ali, with a mandate to strengthen the town's social services. To this end, Dijana announced that Omar is slated to inaugurate a newly completed 27 km paved road between Eyl and adjacent hamlets. Governor Ali also indicated that Omar would concurrently hold meetings with local community and traditional leaders.

=== Tree-planting campaign ===
In June 2014, Puntland Vice President Omar participated in a well-organized event in Garowe marking World Environment Day. He concurrently reaffirmed the Puntland government's commitment to eradicating deforestation. Additionally, Puntland's Minister of Environment, Wildlife and Tourism Guled Salah Barre urged local residents to work toward afforestation and emphasized the importance of collective efforts against environmental degradation. He also announced the launching of a new regional tree planting campaign in Puntland, during which his ministry is slated to plant 25,000 trees by the end of the year. Among the seven cities and towns earmarked for the reforestation initiative are Garowe, Bosaso, Qardho, Buuhoodle, Dhahar, Baran and Galkayo. The campaign is part of a broader partnership between the Puntland government and EU to set up various environmental protection measures in the region, with the aim of promoting reforestation and afforestation.

=== Garowe bilateral agreement ===
In October 2014, Prime Minister of Somalia Abdiweli Sheikh Ahmed led a federal government delegation to the autonomous Puntland region in northeastern Somalia. The delegates included Second Speaker of the Federal Parliament Mahad Abdalle Awad and Minister of Education Ahmed Mohamed Gurase, among other Cabinet members. They were received at the Garowe International Airport by senior Puntland leaders, including President Abdiweli Mohamed Ali and Vice President Omar, and subsequently attended a well-organized welcoming ceremony at the Puntland presidential palace in Garowe alongside various members of the international community. Ahmed subsequently co-chaired a reconciliation conference in the city between the visiting federal officials and Puntland representatives led by President Ali.

The three-day meeting concluded with a 12-point agreement between the stakeholders, with UN envoy to Somalia Ambassador Nicholas Kay, EU Ambassador Michele Cervone d'Urso, IGAD representative Mohamed Abdi Afey, and Ethiopian Consul General Asmalash Woldamirat serving as witnesses. According to federal Minister of Culture and Higher Education Duale Adan Mohamed, the pact stipulates that the recent tripartite agreement between Galmudug and Himan and Heeb establishing a new central regional state within Somalia only applies to the Galguduud and south Mudug provinces. In keeping with a 2013 pact signed by former Prime Minister of Somalia Abdi Farah Shirdon and former Puntland President Abdirahman Mohamed Farole, the Garowe bilateral agreement also states that the Federal and Puntland authorities will work together to form a united and inclusive national army. Additionally, parliamentary committees consisting of Federal and Puntland representatives are mandated with ensuring equitable distribution of foreign assistance and overseeing eventual talks pertaining to the Provisional Constitution. Ambassador Kay welcomed the agreement and urged both parties to work for the public interest, and IGAD representative Afey likewise hailed the reconciliation effort.

=== Puntland-Turkey bilateral cooperation ===
In November 2014, at the Garowe International Airport, Puntland Vice President Omar and other senior regional government leaders welcomed a Turkish delegation led by Ambassador of Turkey to Somalia Olgan Bekar. The visiting officials were taken on a supervisory tour of various educational and medical institutions in the administrative capital Garowe, including the Gambol secondary school, an orphanage and the Garowe general hospital. Osman, Puntland President Abdiweli Mohamed Ali and other local government leaders subsequently held a meeting at the presidential palace with Ambassador Bekar, which focused on strengthening bilateral cooperation between Puntland and Turkey.

=== Karkar delegation ===
In March 2015, Omar, Puntland Minister of Interior Ahmed Elmi Osman and other regional state officials launched a reconciliation conference in support of peace agreements that had been signed in Rakko district and other parts of the Karkar province. A high-level Puntland government delegation consisting of politicians and other officials was dispatched to the area to enforce the treaties. According to Osman, the delegates were led by Omar, with the negotiation meeting concluding successfully.

=== Jubaland legislature ===
In May 2015, Omar led a Puntland delegation to Kismayo, the administrative capital of the Interim Juba Administration. The delegates arrived to attend the official opening ceremony of the regional legislature, and the concurrent inauguration of the new IJA legislators. Additionally, Omar was slated to meet with IJA president Ahmed Mohamed Islam to discuss inter-regional state relations and the security sector, among other bilateral matters.

== Ambassador to Ethiopia ==
On 22 March 2019, Amey was appointed Ambassador by the Federal Government of Somalia. At that time, the country of assignment has not been announced. The Puntland government also approved this appointment.

In April 2019, Amey was appointed Ambassador to Ethiopia. He also served as ambassador to the African Union (AU) and the United Nations Economic Commission for Africa (UNECA).

On 4 June 2021, Camey was informally replaced as Somalia ambassador to Ethiopia by Abdullahi Ahmed Jama.

Political offices
Preceded by Abdisamad Ali Shire	Vice President of Puntland; 2014-2019	Succeeded by Ahmed Elmi Osman
