= Mahad Abdalle Awad =

Somali politician

Mahad Abdalle Awad MP
- Mahad Cabdalla Cawad; Mahad Abdullah Avad مهد عبدالله عود
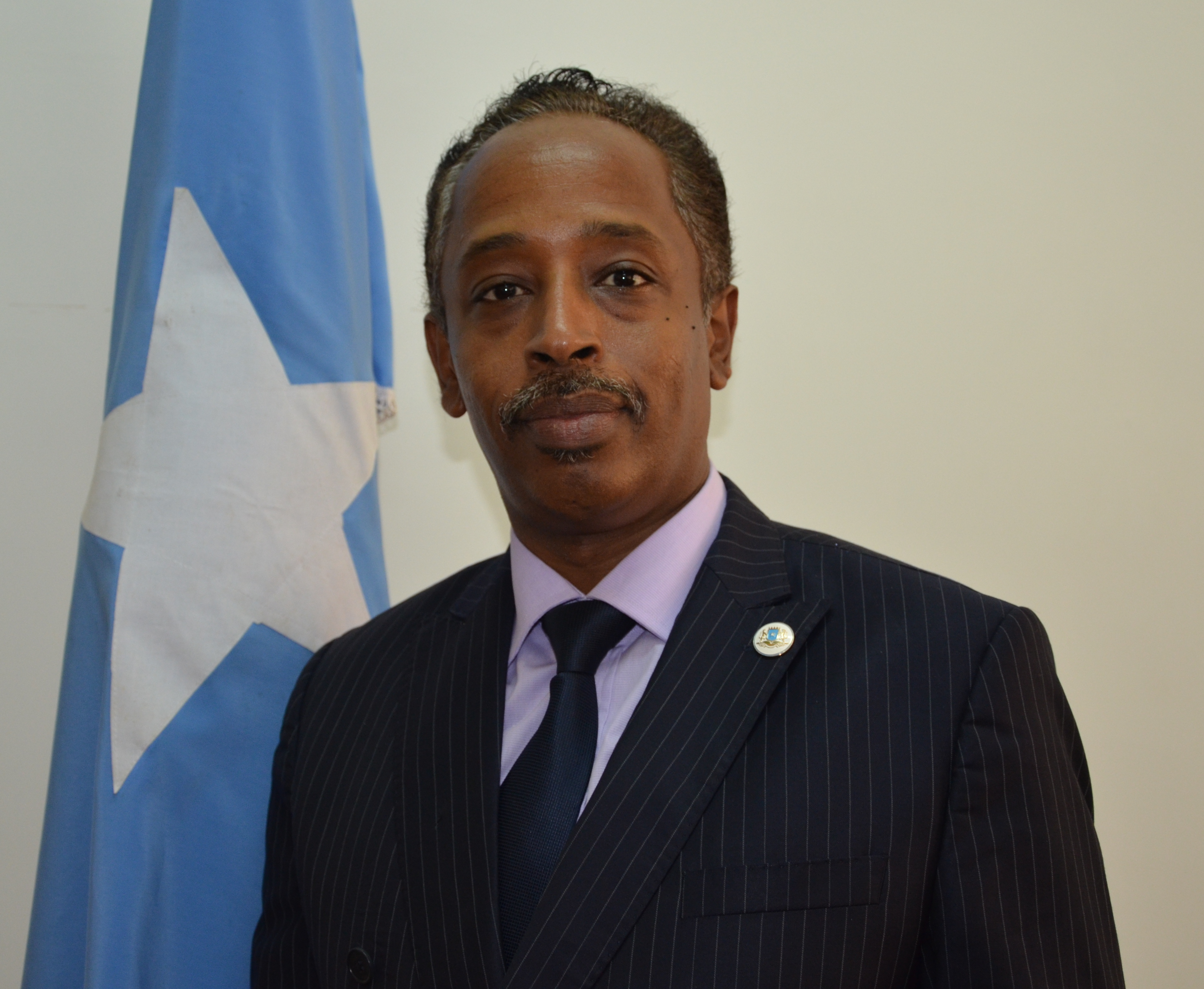

Second deputy speaker of the Federal Parliament of Somalia
- In office 29 August 2012 – 2 May 2022

Personal details
- Born: Mogadishu, Somalia

Mahad Abdalle Awad (Somali: Mahad Cabdalla Cawad, Arabic: مهد عبدالله عوض) is a Somali politician. He is the second deputy speaker of the Federal Parliament of Somalia.

== Career ==
On 20 August 2012, Awad was among the legislators nominated to the newly established Federal Parliament of Somalia. On 29 August 2012, he was appointed second deputy speaker of the Federal Parliament opposite First Deputy Speaker Jaylaani Nur Ikar. They are serving under Speaker Mohamed Osman Jawari.

=== Garowe bilateral agreement ===
In October 2014, the prime minister, Abdiweli Sheikh Ahmed, led a federal government delegation to the autonomous Puntland region in northeastern Somalia. The delegates included the second speaker of the Federal Parliament, Awad, and the minister of education, Ahmed Mohamed Gurase. They were received at the Garowe International Airport by senior Puntland leaders, including President Abdiweli Mohamed Ali and Vice President Abdihakim Abdullahi Haji Omar, and subsequently attended a well-organized welcoming ceremony at the Puntland presidential palace in Garowe with members of the international community. Ahmed subsequently co-chaired a reconciliation conference in the city between the visiting federal officials and Puntland representatives led by President Ali.

The three-day meeting concluded with a 12-point agreement between the stakeholders, with the UN envoy to Somalia, Ambassador Nicholas Kay, the EU ambassador, Michele Cervone d'Urso, the IGAD representative Mohamed Abdi Afey, and the Ethiopian consul general Asmalash Woldamirat as witnesses. According to the federal minister of culture and higher education, Duale Adan Mohamed, the pact stipulates that the tripartite agreement between Galmudug and Himan and Heeb establishing a new central regional state within Somalia only applies to the Galguduud and south Mudug provinces. In keeping with a 2013 pact signed by the former prime minister of Somalia, Abdi Farah Shirdon, and the former Puntland president, Abdirahman Mohamed Farole, the Garowe bilateral agreement also states that the Federal and Puntland authorities will work together to form a united and inclusive national army. Additionally, parliamentary committees consisting of Federal and Puntland representatives are mandated with ensuring equitable distribution of foreign assistance and overseeing eventual talks pertaining to the Provisional Constitution. Ambassador Kay welcomed the agreement and urged both parties to work for the public interest, and the IGAD representative Afey likewise hailed the reconciliation effort.
