= Duale Adan Mohamed =

Former Minister of Culture and Higher Education

Duale Adan Mohamed دوالي عدن محمد

Minister of Youth and Sports
- In office 12 January 2015 – 17 January 2015
- President: Hassan Sheikh Mohamud
- Prime Minister: Omar Abdirashid Ali Sharmarke
- Preceded by: Khalid Omar Ali
- Succeeded by: Mohamed Omar Arte

Minister of Culture and Higher Education
- In office 17 January 2014 – 12 January 2015
- President: Hassan Sheikh Mohamud
- Prime Minister: Abdiweli Sheikh Ahmed
- Preceded by: Maryam Qaasim
- Succeeded by: Abdullahi Ahmed Jama

Duale Adan Mohamed (Somali: Ducale Aadan Maxamed, Arabic: دوالي عدن محمد) is a Somali politician. He served as the Minister of Culture and Higher Education of Somalia under Prime Minister Abdiweli Sheikh Ahmed. Duale Adan Mohamed succeeded Maryam Qaasim when her post as Minister for Human Development and Public Services ended on 17 January 2014. The Ministry was split to allow the creation of 6 cabinet positions one of which was the Ministry of Culture and Higher Education. The other 5 cabinet positions are Ministry of Health, Ministry of Youth and Sports, Ministry of Labour and Social Affairs, Ministry of Women and Human Rights, Ministry of Education. On 12 January 2015, Prime Minister Omar Abdirashid Ali Sharmarke announced his new cabinet which merged the Ministry of Culture and Higher Education with the Ministry of Education. Instead this meant that the new Minister of Education (Abdullahi Ahmed Jama) would take on some additional roles. Duale Adan Mohamed was instead appointed the Minister of Youth and Sports. However, he only served 2 weeks when on 17 January 2015, Prime Minister Sharmarke dissolved his newly nominated cabinet due to vehement opposition by legislators, who rejected the reappointment of certain former ministers. On 27 January 2015, Sharmarke appointed a new, smaller 20 minister cabinet of which Duale Adan Mohamed was replaced by Mohamed Omar Arte.

== Minister of Culture and Higher Education ==
=== Appointment ===
On 17 January 2014, Mohamed was appointed Minister of Culture and Higher Education of Somalia by Prime Minister Abdiweli Sheikh Ahmed.

=== Disaster management workshop ===
In August 2014, Duale opened a workshop on disaster management in Mogadishu. The function was attended by government ministers, political figures, NGO representatives, domestic and international university officials, and various dignitaries. According to the chairman of the parliamentary social services committee Osman Mohamed Mohamud Dufle, the program brought together local and foreign experts with the aim of promoting higher education in the nation. The five-day workshop was organized by the University of Benadir.

=== Ministry of Culture and Higher Education office ===
In September 2014, the Somali federal government reopened the Ministry of Culture and Higher Education building at an official ceremony in Mogadishu. The event was chaired by Deputy Prime Minister and Minister for Religious Affairs Ridwan Hirsi Mohamed, and was attended by representatives from various universities, parliamentarians, diplomats, educators, parents, and patriotic singers. Minister of Culture and Higher Education Duale outlined therein his ministry's efforts at rehabilitating the compound, which had been non-operational for over twenty years. Additionally, Mohamed described the reopening of the office as a major accomplishment for the government and wider society and thanked Duale's ministry for its renovation work.

=== Somali National University ===
In October 2014, Duale Adan Mohamed and Speaker of the Federal Parliament Mohamed Osman Jawari officially opened the first academic year of the Somali National University in Mogadishu. The institution was established in 1974, but later closed down operations in 1991 after the collapse of the central government and the start of the civil war. It was subsequently refurbished and reopened in 2014 after a federal government plan was approved by the Cabinet. Speaking at the university's inauguration ceremony, Jawari described the institution as a pillar of the national education system and noted that it produced many graduates who would go on to assume important leadership positions in the country. He also urged the new pupils to take advantage of the opportunity at hand, and encouraged them to actively participate in the post-conflict reconstruction initiatives. Mohamed in turn emphasized the federal government's commitment to promoting higher education.

=== Garowe bilateral agreement ===
In October 2014, Prime Minister Abdiweli Sheikh Ahmed led a federal government delegation to the autonomous Puntland region in northeastern Somalia. The delegates included Minister of Culture and Higher Education Mohamed, Minister of Education Ahmed Mohamed Gurase and Second Speaker of the Federal Parliament Mahad Abdalle Awad, among other Cabinet members. They were received at the Garowe International Airport by senior Puntland leaders, including President Abdiweli Mohamed Ali and Vice President Abdihakim Abdullahi Haji Omar, and subsequently attended a well-organized welcoming ceremony at the Puntland presidential palace in Garowe alongside various members of the international community. Ahmed subsequently co-chaired a reconciliation conference in the city between the visiting federal officials and Puntland representatives led by President Ali.

The three-day meeting concluded with a 12-point agreement between the stakeholders, with UN envoy to Somalia Ambassador Nicholas Kay, EU Ambassador Michele Cervone d'Urso, IGAD representative Mohamed Abdi Afey, and Ethiopian consul General Asmalash Woldamirat serving as witnesses. According to federal Minister of Culture and Higher Education Mohamed, the pact stipulates that the recent tripartite agreement between Galmudug and Himan and Heeb establishing a new central regional state within Somalia only applies to the Galguduud and south Mudug provinces. In keeping with a 2013 pact signed by former Prime Minister of Somalia Abdi Farah Shirdon and former Puntland President Abdirahman Mohamed Farole, the Garowe bilateral agreement also states that the Federal and Puntland authorities will work together to form a united and inclusive national army. Additionally, parliamentary committees consisting of Federal and Puntland representatives are mandated with ensuring equitable distribution of foreign assistance and overseeing eventual talks pertaining to the Provisional Constitution. Ambassador Kay welcomed the agreement and urged both parties to work for the public interest, and IGAD representative Afey likewise hailed the reconciliation effort.
