= Abdulkadir Sheikh Ali Baghdadi =

Somali politician

Minister of Religious Affairs
- In office 6 February 2015 – 29 March 2017
- President: Hassan Sheikh Mohamud
- Prime Minister: Omar Abdirashid Ali Sharmarke
- Preceded by: Ahmed Hassan Gabobe
- Succeeded by: Iimaan Abdullahi Ali

Personal details
- Born: Somalia
- Party: Independent

Abdulkadir Sheikh Ali Baghdadi is a Somali politician. He is the former Minister of Religious Affairs of Somalia, having been appointed to the position on 6 February 2015 by the former Prime Minister Omar Abdirashid Ali Sharmarke.
