= Ahmed Mohamed Gurase =

Former Minister of Education

Ahmed Mohamed Gurase أحمد محمد جأوراس

Minister of Education
- In office 17 January 2014 – 12 January 2015
- President: Hassan Sheikh Mohamud
- Prime Minister: Abdiweli Sheikh Ahmed
- Preceded by: Maryam Qassim
- Succeeded by: Abdullahi Ahmed Jama

Personal details
- Born: September 15, 1957 (age 69) Goldogob, Somalia
- Party: Independent

Ahmed Mohamed Gurase (Somali: Axmed Maxamed Gurase, Arabic: أحمد محمد جأوراس) is a Somali politician. From January 2014 to January 2015, he served as the Minister of Education of Somalia. Ahmed Mohamed Gurase succeeded Maryam Qaasim when her post as Minister for Human Development and Public Services ended on 17 January 2014. The Ministry was split to allow the creation of 6 cabinet positions one of which was the Ministry of Education. The other 5 cabinet positions are Ministry of Health, Ministry of Culture and Higher Education, Ministry of Labour and Social Affairs, Ministry of Women and Human Rights, Ministry of Sports and Youth. On 12 January 2015, Ahmed Mohamed Gurase was succeeded by Abdullahi Ahmed Jama.

== Minister of Education ==
=== Appointment ===
On 17 January 2014, Gurase was appointed Minister of Education by Prime Minister of Somalia Abdiweli Sheikh Ahmed. He succeeded Maryam Qassim in the position.

=== Unified national curriculum ===
In March 2014, Gurase announced that the federal Ministry of Education is slated to unite the diverse syllabuses in all of Somalia's educational centers. The decision was reached to strengthen the national academic sector in a sustainable manner. According to Gurase, the comprehensive program will also include free education and unified exams throughout the country. The Minister indicated that he would establish a committee to merge the various curricula, thereby facilitating the implementation of unified national scholastic testing.

=== Garowe bilateral agreement ===
In October 2014, Prime Minister Abdiweli Sheikh Ahmed led a federal government delegation to the autonomous Puntland region in northeastern Somalia. The delegates included Minister of Education Gurase and Second Speaker of the Federal Parliament Mahad Abdalle Awad, among other Cabinet members. They were received at the Garowe International Airport by senior Puntland leaders, including President Abdiweli Mohamed Ali and Vice President Abdihakim Abdullahi Haji Omar, and subsequently attended a well-organized welcoming ceremony at the Puntland presidential palace in Garowe alongside various members of the international community. Ahmed subsequently co-chaired a reconciliation conference in the city between the visiting federal officials and Puntland representatives led by President Ali.

The three-day meeting concluded with a 12-point agreement between the stakeholders, with UN envoy to Somalia Ambassador Nicholas Kay, EU Ambassador Michele Cervone d'Urso, IGAD representative Mohamed Abdi Afey, and Ethiopian consul General Asmalash Woldamirat serving as witnesses. According to federal Minister of Culture and Higher Education Duale Adan Mohamed, the pact stipulates that the recent tripartite agreement between Galmudug and Himan and Heeb establishing a new central regional state within Somalia only applies to the Galguduud and south Mudug provinces. In keeping with a 2013 pact signed by former Prime Minister of Somalia Abdi Farah Shirdon and former Puntland President Abdirahman Mohamed Farole, the Garowe bilateral agreement also states that the Federal and Puntland authorities will work together to form a united and inclusive national army. Additionally, parliamentary committees consisting of Federal and Puntland representatives are mandated with ensuring equitable distribution of foreign assistance and overseeing eventual talks pertaining to the Provisional Constitution. Ambassador Kay welcomed the agreement and urged both parties to work for the public interest, and IGAD representative Afey likewise hailed the reconciliation effort.

=== End of term ===
On 12 January 2015, Gurase's term as Minister of Education of Somalia ended, following the appointment of a new Cabinet by Prime Minister Omar Abdirashid Ali Sharmarke. He was succeeded at the position by Abdullahi Ahmed Jama.
