= Rosalind Marsden =

British diplomat and public servant

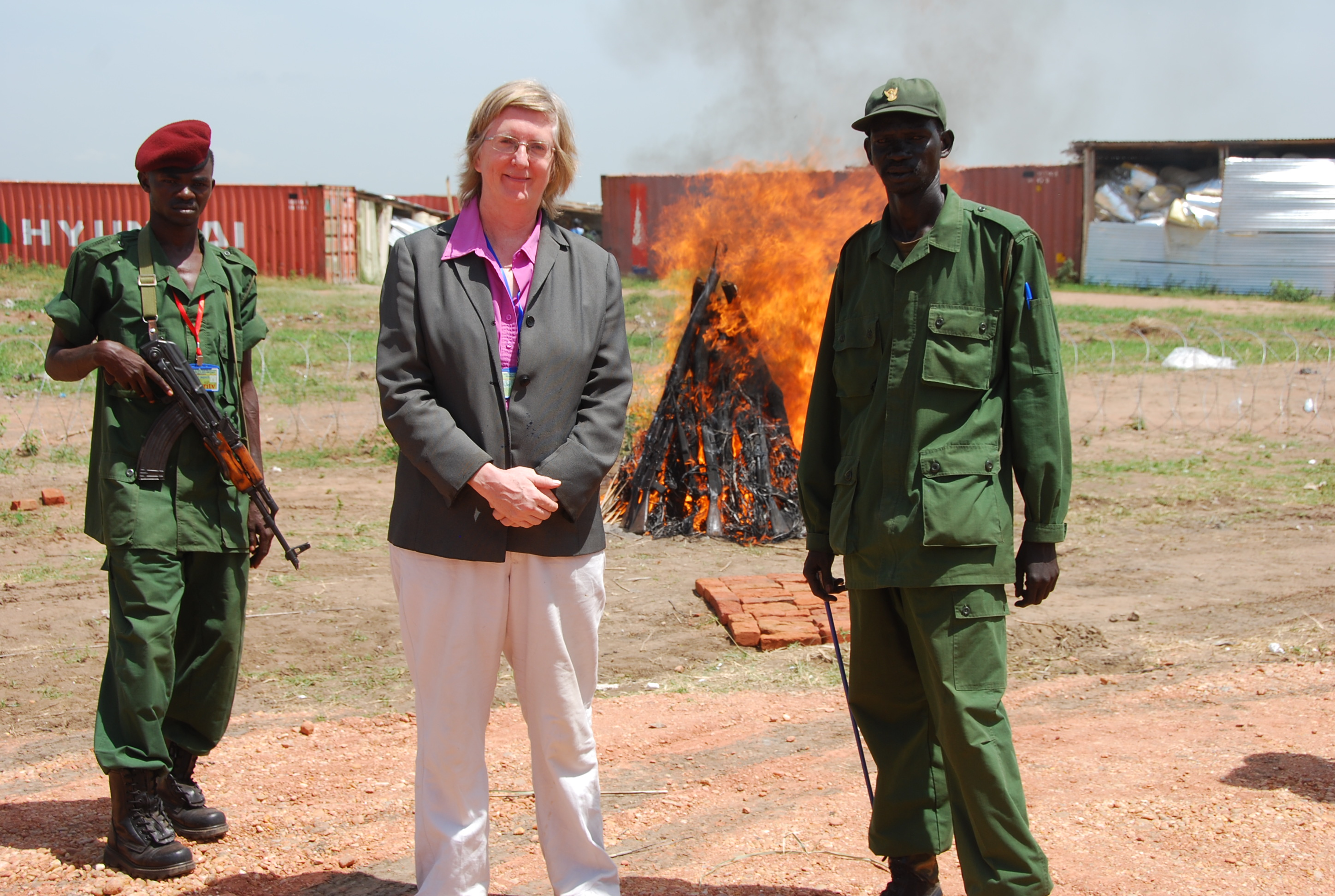
Her Majesty's Ambassador to Sudan, Dr Rosalind Marsden, attended the launch of the "Southern Sudan Demobilisation, Disarmament and Reintegration" (DDR) programme in Juba on 10 June 2009. The UK has donated £20 million to this process, the largest of its kind in the world.

Dame Rosalind Mary Marsden DCMG (born 1950) is a British diplomat and public servant. She was European Union Special Representative to Sudan from 2010 to 2013. Dame Rosalind is a Patron of the charity Kids for Kids, helping children in Darfur, Sudan. She is currently an Associate Fellow in the Africa Programme at Chatham House.

== Early life and education ==
She was educated at Woking County Grammar School for Girls, Somerville College, Oxford and St Antony's College, Oxford.

== Background ==
- 1974, Assistant Desk Officer at the Near East and North Africa Department
- 1976–1980, Tokyo, the Second Secretary, Chancery (later promoted to First Secretary)
- 1980–1983, FCO, policy planner
- 1983–1985, European Community Department (Internal) Head of Section
- 1985–1988, British Embassy, Bonn
- 1989–1991, Deputy Head, Hong Kong Department
- 1991–1993, National Westminster Bank (Secondment)
- 1993–1996, Tokyo, Political Counsellor
- 1996–1999, Head, United Nations Department
- 1999–2003, Director, Asia-Pacific
- 2003–2006, Kabul, Afghanistan as Her Majesty's Ambassador
- 2006–2007, Basra, Iraq as British Consul-General
- 2007–2010, British Ambassador, Sudan
- 2010–2013, EU Special Representative for Sudan and South Sudan

In Kabul, she was a prominent supporter of the Afghan Woman's Hour, a women's radio programme for the BBC World Service Trust, to be broadcast on World Service Radio.

== Honours ==
Marsden was appointed DCMG in the New Year Honours 2010. She is also an Honorary Fellow, Somerville College, Oxford.
