= Sahra Mohamed Ali Samatar =

Somali politician

Sahra Ali Samatar
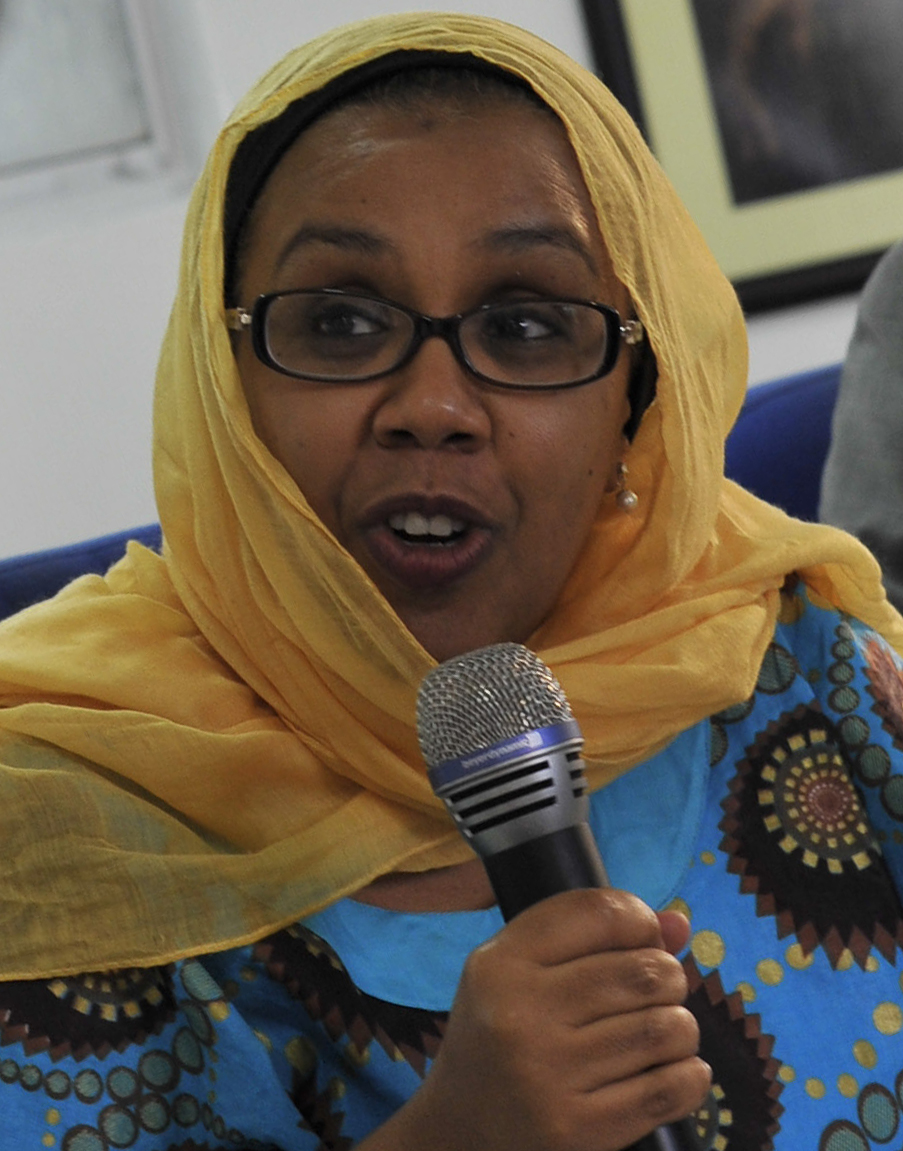

Minister of Women and Human Rights of Somalia
- In office 27 January 2015 – 20 March 2017
- Prime Minister: Omar Abdirashid Ali Sharmarke
- Preceded by: Khadijo Mohamed Diriye
- Succeeded by: Deeqa Yasin Hajji Yusuf

Personal details
- Born: Somalia
- Party: Independent

Sahra Mohamed Ali Samatar, also known as Sahra Ali Samatar is a Somali politician. She is the former the Minister of Women and Human Rights of Somalia, having been appointed to the position on 27 January 2015 by the former Prime Minister Omar Abdirashid Ali Sharmarke. During her tenure, she has introduced a ban on female genital mutilation nationwide and worked on equal rights for men and women within Somalia.

== Political career ==
Sahra Mohamed Ali Samatar was named to the cabinet of Prime Minister Omar Abdirashid Ali Sharmarke as the Minister of Women and Human Rights on 27 January 2015. She was among 20 changes made to the cabinet by Sharmarke, which included several debuting ministers in addition to Samatar.

Samatar announced the government's intention to ban female genital mutilation nationwide in August 2015. She said "Time has come for us to eradicate this bad practice and protect the rights of girls and women in our country, every person has the right to physical integrity and can not be violated. Female circumcision is a cruel and degrading customary practice and is tantamount to torture. The circumcision of girls is prohibited." This change followed the local ban in the region of Puntland in 2014.

She attended an event to celebrate Women's Day in Mogadishu in March 2015. In July, Samatar condemned the rumours surrounding a new gender law which sought to give men and women equal rights, after rumours spread that it was legalising same sex marriage in contrary to Islamic law, calling the claims "propaganda and baseless report".

== Personal life ==
Samatar is a member of the Tumal clan. She is the daughter of Mohammad Ali Samatar, former Prime Minister and Vice President of Somalia, who had been involved in the military coup of Siad Barre in 1969.
