= Jeylani Nur Ikar =

First Deputy Speaker of the Federal Parliament of Somalia

Jaylaani Nur Ikar جيلاني نور
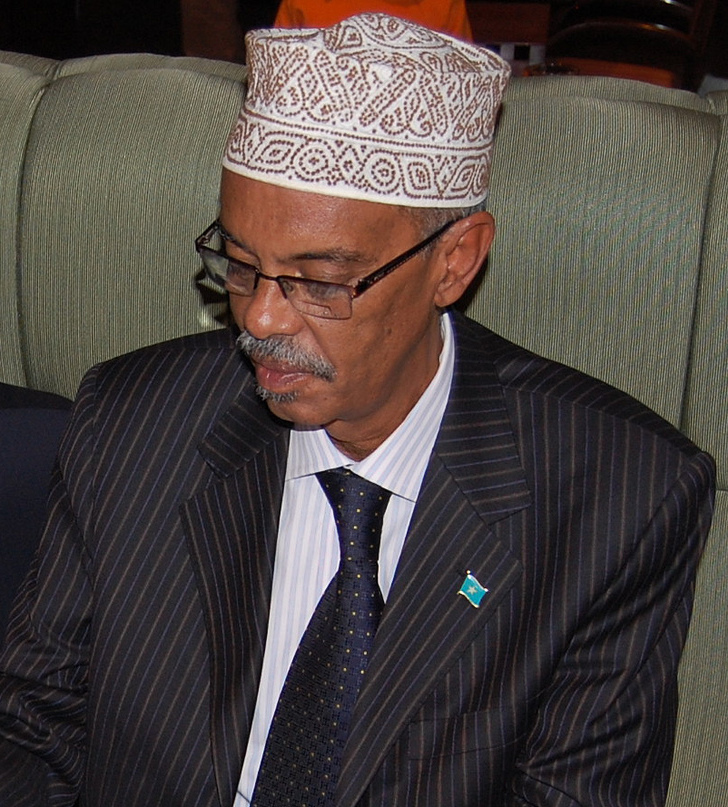

First Deputy Speaker of the Federal Parliament of Somalia
- Incumbent
- Assumed office August 29, 2012
- Speaker: Mohamed Osman Jawari

Jaylaani Nur Ikar (Somali: Jaylaani Nuur Ikar, Arabic: جيلاني نور), also known as Jeylani Nur Ikar, is a Somali politician. He was the First Deputy Speaker of the Federal Parliament of Somalia.

== Career ==
=== Federal Parliament ===
On 20 August 2012, Ikar was among the legislators nominated to the newly established Federal Parliament of Somalia.

=== First Deputy Speaker of the Federal Parliament ===
On 29 August 2012, Ikar was appointed First Deputy Speaker of the Federal Parliament opposite Second Deputy Speaker Mahad Abdalle Awad. They were serving under Speaker Mohamed Osman Jawari.

After the election of the new president Mohammed Abdullaahi Farmaajo he did not get elected as the deputy speaker of the Federal Parliament.
