= Somali Disaster Management Agency =

Government Agency in Somalia

- Hay’adda Gargaarka iyo Maareynta Musiibooyinka

Government agency overview
- Formed: 2011
- Jurisdiction: Federal Government of Somalia
- Headquarters: Mogadishu, Somalia
- Government agency executive: Mohamuud Moallim Abdulle, Commissioner
- Website: https://sodma.gov.so/

The Somali Disaster Management Agency (SoDMA) or Somali National Disaster Management Authority (Somali: Hay’adda Gargaarka iyo Maareynta Musiibooyinka) is the national emergency management agency of the Federal Republic of Somalia.

== Overview ==
The organisation was established in 2011 by the Prime Minister of the Transitional Federal Government during the 2010-11 Somali famine. Legislation authorising the Somali Disaster Management Agency was passed in 2016 under the Federal Ministry for Humanitarian Affairs and Disaster Management.

In 2022 the Federal Ministry for Humanitarian Affairs and Disaster Management was abolished and the Somali Disaster Management Agency assumed the legal roles and responsibilities of the former ministry.

== Controversies ==
The agency has faced several controversies, primarily related to its handling of humanitarian aid and disaster response, including logistical issues, transparency concerns, and the strain of operating in a conflict-affected region with climate-induced crises.

=== Distribution of Expired Supplies ===
In May 2025, SoDMA was shamed for distributing expired COVID-19 supplies instead of vital medicines, prompting public outrage. Governor Wehliye of the Hiiraan region called it a "national embarrassment," neglecting toward communities, including Macawiisley fighters. A specific incident in Moqokori involved a discrepancy where SoDMA claimed to have delivered 133 boxes of medicine, while evidence showed only 12 boxes of outdated supplies were provided, leading to demands for accountability. Later Hirshabelle State suspends cooperation with SODMA over mismanagement of humanitarian aid.

=== Food Shortages and Mismanagement ===
In December 2022, SoDMA announced it was at risk of running out of food supplies amid ongoing efforts to liberate areas from Al-Shabaab control. Chairman Mohamed Moalim reported the urgent need for food aid, raising concerns about the agency's capacity to manage resources effectively during a hunger emergency, despite the UN noting Somalia had narrowly averted a full-blown famine.

=== Operational and Funding Challenges ===
SoDMA has faced scrutiny over its ability to respond to recurring disasters like droughts and floods. While the agency has been criticized for efforts in managing humanitarian crises, critics argue it struggles with limited funding and capacity. For instance, in 2023, SoDMA joined the Risk-informed Early Action Partnership (REAP) to enhance anticipatory disaster management also the need for more international financial support to scale up operations, indicating internal resource constraints.
