= Abdiweli Sheikh Ahmed =

Somali economist and politician

Abdiweli Sheikh Ahmed عبدالولي الشيخ أحمد
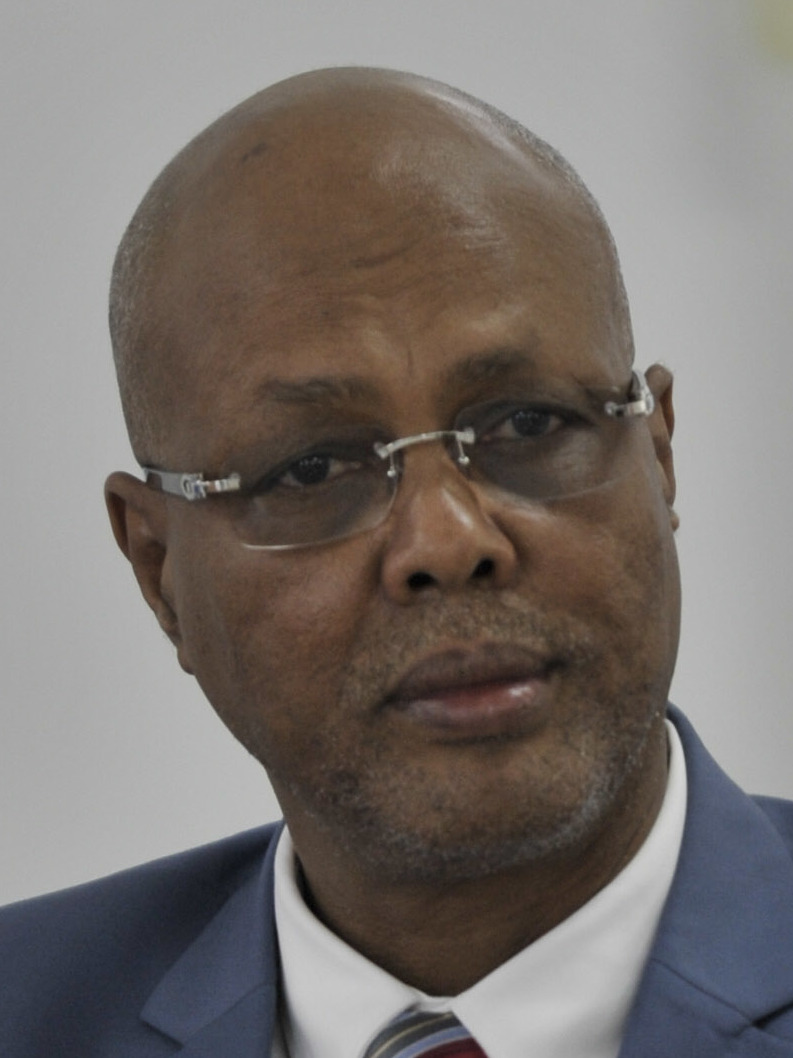

10th Prime Minister of Somalia
- In office 21 December 2013 – 24 December 2014
- President: Hassan Sheikh Mohamud
- Preceded by: Abdi Farah Shirdon
- Succeeded by: Omar Sharmarke

Personal details
- Born: 1959 (age 66–67) Bardere, Somalia
- Party: Independent
- Education: Somali National University; Algonquin College; University of Ottawa

Abdiweli Sheikh Ahmed (Somali: Cabdiweli Sheekh Axmed, Arabic: عبدالولي الشيخ أحمد; born 1959), also known as Abdiweli Sheikh Ahmed Mohammad, is a Somali economist and politician, who served as the Prime Minister of Somalia from December 2013 to December 2014. He has also held senior positions with various international organizations, including the World Bank, USAID, African Union/IBAR, the European Union, the Bank of Canada, COMESA, and the Islamic Development Bank in Jeddah.

During his tenure as prime minister, he enacted several domestic reforms as part of the local post-conflict development process. Among these initiatives were the development of a Work Plan within the framework of Vision 2016 and in line with the New Deal Compact and the Peace and Stabilisation Goals. He also established a new security task force and committees, approved a new Anti-terrorism law, initiated stabilization efforts in liberated areas, launched national reconciliation talks, established new educational and training institutions in Mogadishu, conducted a Population Estimation Survey for Somalia (PESS) in conjunction with the federal Ministry of Planning and International Cooperation, enacted a new Media Law, restructured ministerial subcommittees within the Federal Cabinet, and established commissions for Constitutional Review and Implementation, as well as for Electoral Commission and Boundary and Federalization Commission.

Ahmed worked to strengthen bilateral cooperation with the United Arab Emirates in the areas of capacity building and the rehabilitation of government institutions. He also ratified three core International Labour Organization conventions on behalf of the Federal Republic of Somalia, adopted the UN Convention on the Rights of the Child, and signed the first National Indicative Programme (NIP) between Somalia and the European Union in 25 years.

As of February 2015, Ahmed serves as the chair of the Somali Forum for Unity and Democracy.

== Background ==
=== Personal life ===
Ahmed was born in 1959 in Bardera, situated in the Jubaland state of Somalia. He belongs to the Marehan Darod clan.

Ahmed moved to Canada when the civil war broke out in 1991. He holds dual Somali and Canadian citizenship.

In addition to Canada and Somalia, Ahmed has lived and worked in Ethiopia, Djibouti, Egypt, Yemen, Saudi Arabia, the United Arab Emirates, Zambia, Kenya, and Malaysia. He speaks Somali, Arabic, English, Italian, and French.

Ahmed is married and has children.

=== Education ===
Ahmed earned a degree in economics from the Somali National University (SNU) in Mogadishu. He later studied at Algonquin College in Ottawa, Ontario, where he received a diploma in computer programming. Ahmed subsequently matriculated to the University of Ottawa, where he earned an M.A. in economics. He pursued doctoral studies in international trade and development at the same institution.

Ahmed also holds several professional diplomas, including a diploma in project management from the United States Department of Agriculture (USDA), a diploma in project planning and appraisal from SIDAM, and a diploma in animal health management from the USDA and the Animal and Plant Health Inspection Service (APHIS).

=== Early career ===
Ahmed has worked with various specialized agencies, including: Economic Commission for Africa (ECA), ECOWAS, Organization of Islamic Cooperation (OIC), Intergovernmental Authority on Development (IGAD), African Development Bank (AfDB), Gulf Cooperation Council (GCC), Asian Development Bank (ADB), Global Dry land Alliance Initiative, Inter Agency Donor Group (IADG), OPEC, and Arab Funds for Development (Saudi Fund, Kuwait Fund, Qatar Foundation). Additionally, he has undertaken many international work and diplomatic missions.

From 1984 to 1990, Ahmed served as the director-general of the Livestock Marketing and Health Agency in Mogadishu.

Between 1991 and 1998, he was the chief executive officer at MISK Enterprises, a livestock exporting firm with offices in Djibouti, Sana'a, and Nairobi.

Ahmed worked as an International Development and Trade Economics Analyst at the Bank of Canada and at the University of Ottawa from 1998 to 2003.

From 2003 to 2006, he was a Program Manager at the African Union's Inter-African Bureau for Animal Resources (IBAR) – Red Sea Livestock Trade Commission.

Ahmed subsequently acted as a Senior Livestock and Pastoralism Advisor to the Common Market for Eastern and Southern Africa (COMESA) in Lusaka between 2007 and 2009.

From 2010 to 2013, Ahmed served as a Senior Agriculture and Rural Development Officer for the Islamic Development Bank in Jeddah. He was part of the organization's Department of Agriculture and Livestock Development.

Ahmed does not have a previous political background.

== Prime Minister of Somalia ==
=== Appointment ===
On 12 December 2013, President of Somalia Hassan Sheikh Mohamud announced to the Federal Parliament that Abdiweli Sheikh Ahmed had been appointed as the new national prime minister, succeeding Abdi Farah Shirdon. Ahmed was selected over former finance minister Hussein Abdi Halane and former Transportation Minister Abdiwahid Elmi Gonjeh for the position.

On 21 December, legislators endorsed the selection, with 239 of the present 243 MPs voting in favor of Ahmed as prime minister, two lawmakers voting against, and two abstaining. UN Special Representative for Somalia Nicholas Kay congratulated Prime Minister Ahmed on his appointment and pledged to continue supporting the Federal Government's peace and state-building efforts.

=== Cabinet ===
Ahmed subsequently initiated consultations to form a new Cabinet, which would then be presented to parliament for approval. In early January 2014, he requested a 10-day extension of the deadline to constitute a new Council of Ministers, a request that the federal legislature unanimously granted on 11 January. On 14 January, the parliament dismissed a motion to disqualify officials from former prime minister Shirdon's Cabinet from being eligible to join Ahmed's new Council of Ministers. Both Prime Minister Ahmed and President Mohamud had urged legislators to reject the motion. 113 MPs voted in favor of not conducting a vote on the motion, while 99 voted in favor of voting on the motion, and 6 abstained.

On 17 January 2014, after discussions with President Mohamud, other Somali leaders, and federal legislators, Prime Minister Ahmed agreed on a Cabinet composition, Ahmed formed a new, expanded Council of Ministers comprising 25 ministers, 25 deputy ministers, and 5 state ministers. Only two Cabinet members were retained from the previous Shirdon administration.

On 21 January 2014, in anticipation of the vote of confidence on the new Council of Ministers, Ahmed presented his government program to the Federal Parliament. He outlined the incoming administration's priorities, which included enhancing government institutions, particularly in the security sector. Ahmed announced plans to increase the number of active Somali military personnel to 28,000, consisting of 25,000 infantrymen, 2,000 naval officers, and 1,000 air force officers. He also pledged to oust militants from their remaining strongholds in southern Somalia.

On 21 January 2014, lawmakers largely approved Ahmed's new Council of Ministers. Parliament speaker Mohamed Osman Jawari announced that 184 of the 233 MPs present at the legislative session endorsed the Cabinet, 46 voted against it, and 1 lawmaker abstained from voting.

On 23 January 2014, Prime Minister Ahmed presided over his inaugural Cabinet meeting. He underscored the responsibilities of himself and his Cabinet members, emphasizing the need to strengthen the security sector, accelerate institutional reforms, and improve local service provision.

=== Domestic policy ===
==== Hussein national funeral committee ====
In February 2014, Prime Minister Ahmed initiated the establishment of a governmental committee to oversee the preparations for a national funeral for the late Prime Minister of Somalia, Abdirizak Haji Hussein, who died on January 31, 2014. The panel was chaired by Deputy Prime Minister Ridwan Hirsi Mohamed. In addition to expressing his condolences to Hussein's family and friends, Ahmed emphasized Hussein's significant role as a leading figure in the Somali nationalist movement and a dedicated public servant.

==== Security committees and task force ====
In February 2014, Prime Minister Ahmed introduced his administration's new national security strategy, which included the formation of a governmental committee tasked with investigating terrorist incidents. Alongside this, a task force was established to foster cooperation between central authorities and various sectors of society, including cabinet ministers, district administrations, law enforcement officials, religious leaders, and civil society representatives. The government also initiated the drafting of anti-terror legislation and planned to evaluate the performance of security agencies.

==== Stabilization initiatives ====
In March 2014, Prime Minister Ahmed convened a meeting with international representatives to discuss the ongoing military offensive against the Al-Shabaab insurgent group and to seek support for government efforts to stabilize recently liberated areas. Security operations were underway in strategic towns like Rabdhure, Wajid, Hudur, and Burdhubo, aimed at removing improvised explosive devices (IEDs) left by militants. The federal government committed to delivering relief assistance and coordinating stabilization initiatives through regional representatives. The US Department of State expressed support for the military campaign and pledged further assistance, while UN Special Representative for Somalia Nicholas Kay emphasized collaboration between the Somali government and its international partners for stabilization efforts.

==== Office for religious scholarship ====
In March 2014, Prime Minister Ahmed hosted a meeting with Somali Islamic leaders during which he announced the establishment of a government office for religious scholars. The gathering was attended by several government officials, including deputy prime minister and Minister of Religious Affairs Ridwan Hirsi Mohamed, Minister of Information Mustaf Ali Duhulow, Minister of Justice and Constitutional Affairs Farah Sh. Abdulkadir Mohamed, Minister of Agriculture Abdi Ahmed Hussein, as well as 16 religious scholars. According to Ahmed, the new bureau is intended to enhance cooperation between the federal government and religious authorities, playing a role in policy-making and influencing the public. The office is also tasked with preserving Muslim traditions from extremist manipulation. Second Chairman of the Somali Religious Scholars Union, Nor Barud, expressed gratitude for the meeting and emphasized the importance of clarifying traditional Islamic principles.

==== Aviation Training Academy ====
In April 2014, Prime Minister Ahmed laid the foundation stone for a new national Aviation Training Academy at the Aden Adde International Airport in Mogadishu. The event was attended by officials such as Minister of Air and Land Transport Said Jama Mohamed, Minister of Finance Hussein Abdi Halane, the Turkish ambassador, and the airport's general manager. Ahmed emphasized that the institution would enhance the skills of aviation personnel within the country, focusing on training domestic talent. Additionally, he inspected the construction of a modern terminal funded by the Turkish Favori aviation firm, aimed at improving the airport's functionality. Minister Qorshel stated that the new terminal's construction was expected to take six months and would help ease congestion at the Aden Adde International Airport.

==== Meteorological Institute ====
In April 2014, Prime Minister Ahmed laid the foundation stone for the reconstruction of the former meteorological school in Mogadishu. The institution had closed down in the early 1990s due to the civil war. Minister of Aviation Said Mohamed Qorshel and the Turkish ambassador to Somalia Kani Touram were also present. Ahmed welcomed the relaunch of the school, highlighting the opportunity for Somali nationals to receive training within their own country.

==== Anti-terrorism law ====
In April 2014, Prime Minister Ahmed announced that the Cabinet had introduced a new anti-terrorism law to the federal parliament for approval. The bill aimed to empower the central authorities to legally address extremist groups, including Al-Shabaab, and other organizations involved in terror-related activities. The bill underwent parliamentary deliberation over subsequent weeks but was later repealed due to inconsistencies. As part of broader security sector reforms, the Cabinet unanimously approved the anti-terrorism bill on 10 July 2014.

==== 2014 Work Plan ====
In May 2014, Prime Minister Ahmed presented his administration's Work Plan for the 2014 calendar year to the Federal Parliament. This marked the first annual document of its kind since the civil war's onset in the early 1990s. Aligned with Vision 2016, the New Deal Compact, and the Peace and Stabilisation Goals, the plan prioritized various aspects including security operations, judiciary reform, foreign policy review, federalization, political inclusivity, economic development, revenue mobilization, improved social services, and enhanced institutional capacity.

Within the plan, Ahmed emphasized the finalization of federalism processes, including the establishment of regional administrations and constitutional assessment. He highlighted collaboration with the export sector for economic growth and job creation, while reviewing private sector regulations to promote free trade and business development. Transparent revenue collection processes were to be established, along with the delivery of social services such as education and healthcare. Ahmed also pledged to protect the rights of workers, women, and vulnerable individuals, and to create opportunities for youth through sports centers. Infrastructure investment in areas like roads, airports, seaports, and utilities was emphasized, along with improving government institutions through renovations and regulatory updates.

==== Population Estimation Survey for Somalia ====
In May 2014, Prime Minister Ahmed chaired a presentation on the Population Estimation Survey for Somalia (PESS) in Mogadishu. Conducted by the federal Ministry of Planning and International Cooperation, the survey collected data from various areas across the country. The PESS aimed to support evidence-based policy-making by providing qualitative data for development and humanitarian programs. The survey covered all 18 administrative regions, including urban, rural, and peripatetic areas, with assistance from local communities and international partners. Ahmed's engagement included visits to various national ministries, further underscoring the survey's importance.

==== Ministerial subcommittees ====
In May 2014, Prime Minister Ahmed appointed new ministerial subcommittees within the Cabinet. The initiative aims to strengthen coordination between the national ministries and federal parliament, and thereby facilitate the implementation of government plans. Among the new ministerial subcommittees are working groups on economic development, national security, politics, social affairs and service development. Each subcommittee is tasked with overseeing activities within its respective assigned work area. Additionally, all Cabinet projects must hereafter first be discussed at the subcommittee level.

==== Constitutional Review and Implementation Commission ====
In May 2014, Prime Minister Ahmed chaired a Cabinet meeting during which the Council of Ministers approved a new five-member independent Constitutional Review and Implementation Commission. After a period of debate over the oversight panel's prospective members, the ministers settled on former Puntland Minister of Women and Family Affairs Asha Gelle Dirie, as well as Hassan Omar Mahad Alle, Osman Jama Ali Kalun, Mohamed Abdalle Salah and Hassan Hussein Haji. Minister of Constitution Farah Sheikh Abdullahi thanked the Cabinet for authorizing the commission, and stated that his ministry had been working diligently to form it. Prime Minister Ahmed likewise hailed the oversight body as a significant state-building initiative, and indicated that the commission's members were each knowledgeable on constitutional affairs.

==== Media law ====
On 1 September 2014, in a meeting chaired by Prime Minister Ahmed, the Federal Cabinet approved a new Draft Media Bill. The legislation was welcomed by the National Union of Somali Journalists and other local media groups, who urged public institutions to adhere to the bill once implemented. Among other clauses, the new law proposes the establishment of an Independent Media Council. According to Minister of Information Mustaf Ali Duhulow, after having consulted with Somali journalists and directors, the media bill was put before the Federal Parliament for deliberation during its fifth legislative session.

==== Operation Indian Ocean ====
In August 2014, the Somali government-led Operation Indian Ocean was launched to clean up the remaining insurgent-held pockets in the countryside. On 1 September 2014, a U.S. drone strike carried out as part of the broader mission killed Al-Shabaab leader Moktar Ali Zubeyr. U.S. authorities hailed the raid as a major symbolic and operational loss for Al-Shabaab, and the Somali government offered a 45-day amnesty to all moderate members of the militant group. Political analysts also suggested that the insurgent commander's death will likely lead to Al-Shabaab's fragmentation and eventual dissolution. At a September conference in London on rebuilding the Somali National Army and strengthening the local security sector, Prime Minister Ahmed indicated that the overall mission's aim was to seize all insurgent-held territory by 2015.

==== Garowe bilateral agreement ====
In October 2014, Prime Minister Ahmed led a federal government delegation to the autonomous Puntland region in northeastern Somalia. The delegates included Second Speaker of the Federal Parliament Mahad Abdalle Awad and Minister of Education Ahmed Mohamed Gurase, among other Cabinet members. They were received at the Garowe International Airport by senior Puntland leaders, including President Abdiweli Mohamed Ali and Vice President Abdihakim Abdullahi Haji Omar, and subsequently attended a well-organized welcoming ceremony at the Puntland presidential palace in Garowe alongside various members of the international community. Ahmed subsequently co-chaired a reconciliation conference in the city between the visiting federal officials and Puntland representatives led by President Ali.

The three-day meeting concluded with a 12-point agreement between the stakeholders, with UN envoy to Somalia Ambassador Nicholas Kay, EU Ambassador Michele Cervone d'Urso, IGAD representative Mohamed Abdi Afey, and Ethiopian Consul General Asmalash Woldamirat serving as witnesses. According to federal Minister of Culture and Higher Education Duale Adan Mohamed, the pact stipulates that the recent tripartite agreement between Galmudug and Himan and Heeb establishing a new central regional state within Somalia only applies to the Galguduud and south Mudug provinces. In keeping with a 2013 pact signed by former prime minister of Somalia Abdi Farah Shirdon and former Puntland president Abdirahman Mohamed Farole, the Garowe bilateral agreement also states that the Federal and Puntland authorities will work together to form a united and inclusive national army. Additionally, parliamentary committees consisting of Federal and Puntland representatives are mandated with ensuring equitable distribution of foreign assistance and overseeing eventual talks pertaining to the Provisional Constitution. Ambassador Kay welcomed the agreement and urged both parties to work for the public interest, and IGAD representative Afey likewise hailed the reconciliation effort.

==== Vote of confidence ====
In October–November 2014, a rift developed between Prime Minister Ahmed and President Hassan Sheikh Mohamud over a cabinet reshuffle by Ahmed. On 25 October, Premier Ahmed transferred former Minister of Justice and Constitutional Affairs Farah Sh. Abdulkadir Mohamed, Peace and Development Party member and former Deputy Minister of Foreign Affairs Mahad Mohamed Salad, and other key allies of Mohamud to other positions within the Council of Ministers. Mohamud immediately issued a statement declaring the cabinet reshuffle null and void, arguing that he had not been consulted about the move. He also ordered all of the reassigned ministers to carry on with their ordinary duties.

On 27 October, UN Special Envoy to Somalia Nicholas Kay met with Mohamud and Ahmed at the Villa Somalia compound in an unsuccessful attempt to broker an agreement between the two officials. Puntland Information Minister Abdiweli Hirsi Abdulle also suggested that the row should be resolved through constitutional means, asserted that the Puntland regional administration was prepared to mediate between the two federal leaders, and called on international representatives to do the same. Similarly, Speaker of the Federal Parliament Mohamed Osman Jawari indicated that he was confident that the disagreement could be resolved through legal channels.

In early November, UN Ambassador Kay and EU representatives Alexander Rondos and Michele Cervone issued separate press statements urging President Mohamud and Prime Minister Ahmed to set aside their differences for the greater communal good, and to continue instead working toward the goals enshrined in Vision 2016. Kay also expressed concern about the possibility of vote buying marring a parliamentary vote of confidence, and indicated that any such potential political disruption would be reported to the UN Security Council. Similarly, Rondos and Cervone in their capacity as financial stakeholders urged the Federal MPs to adhere to standard legislative protocols. On 3 November, President Mohamud issued a statement assuring the international community of his administration's continued commitment to fulfilling Vision 2016. He also called on foreign partners to respect Somalia's sovereignty and allow its legislative process to proceed constitutionally. On 4 November, during a special parliamentary session, several federal lawmakers expressed disappoint over Ambassador Kay's statement, asking that he either apologize or step down from office. Other legislators from Puntland supported Kay's press release, which emphasized governmental continuity and unity.

President Mohamud and Prime Minister Ahmed concurrently began holding consultations with various Federal MPs to gather support ahead of a potential vote of confidence. On 6 November, IGAD Special Envoy to Somalia Ambassador Abdi Afey met with the two leaders to try and broker an agreement, and also conferred with Parliament Speaker Jawari. Additionally, almost 100 MPs concurrently lodged a no confidence motion against Prime Minister Ahmed. Although Federal Parliament Speaker Jawari received the motion, a date of deliberation in the legislature was not specified.

On 9 November, Federal Parliament Speaker Jawari and international representatives began separate mediation efforts in a final attempt to resolve the differences between President Mohamud and Prime Minister Ahmed. The Egyptian government also called for an urgent meeting of the Somalia Committee within the Arab League to assist in the reconciliation talks. On 10 November, the U.S. Department of State issued a statement likewise indicating that a parliamentary vote of confidence would be counterproductive. It instead urged the Federal Government of Somalia's leaders to unite, and suggested that the U.S. authorities would not attend a conference in Copenhagen on Somalia's New Deal as long as the FGS's leadership was divided.

On 11 November, legislators met in parliament to deliberate on the no-confidence motion. Supporters of Prime Minister Ahmed subsequently began to make noise, effectively precluding any discussion. Consequently, Federal Parliament Speaker Jawari indefinitely adjourned the session.

On 11 November, a spokesman for the UK Foreign & Commonwealth Office reiterated the international community's call for all Somali parties to set aside their differences, respect parliamentary protocol, and work together for the greater national good. Due to the political infighting, the Danish government also canceled a planned meeting in Copenhagen between President Mohamud and global Somali community members ahead of the New Deal conference on Somalia. On 14 November, the U.S. government likewise warned that it would cut financial assistance to Somalia if the top Somali Federal Government officials did not resolve their differences.

On 15 November, a second attempt to hold a parliamentary vote of confidence again failed. Over 100 lawmakers sang the national anthem and held up placards supporting Prime Minister Ahmed, prompting Federal Parliament Speaker Jawari to indefinitely adjourn the session.

On 16 November, MP supporters of President Mohamud presented a letter to Federal Parliament Speaker Jawari calling for him to convene the legislature so that the vote of confidence could take place. Deputy Prime Minister Ridwan Hersi Mohamed and a number of cabinet ministers and lawmakers supporting Prime Minister Ahmed concurrently met in the capital, and issued a four-point statement defending the cabinet's independence and demanding an end to outside interference with its functions. On 17 November, 14 ministers within the 50 member cabinet signed a counter-petition asking the prime minister to resign in order to safeguard national interests. Believed to be supporters of the president, the ministerial officials also indicated that they themselves would step down from their positions if the premier declined to do so within 24 hours. On 18 November, Prime Minister Ahmed convened the first Cabinet meeting in several weeks, after which Deputy Prime Minister Ridwan Hersi Mohamed announced that any minister who was unable to work with the government was free to resign and make way for a replacement.

On 24 November, a third attempt to hold a parliamentary vote of confidence ended in chaos. Lawmakers supporting Prime Minister Ahmed shredded the attendance register as well as their copies of the motion. They also immediately began yelling when Federal Parliament Speaker Jawari entered the hall, prompting the legislative leader to indefinitely adjourn the session. Jawari subsequently issued a statement postponing all parliamentary sessions until a lasting and effective resolution to the rift could be found.

On 24 November, Prime Minister Ahmed released a statement indicating that he made the Cabinet reshuffle to ameliorate the performance of the Council of Ministers and resolve internal wrangles. He likewise indicated that the directive was in line with Article 100 (a) and (b) of the Provisional Constitution, and that the Office of the President's decree attempting to nullify the reshuffle contravened those constitutional clauses. Additionally, Ahmed asserted that the ensuing motion of no confidence was motivated by displeasure over the transfer of one particular Cabinet minister to another portfolio. He also suggested that the motion was regarded by most legislators and the general public as having been driven by graft, that the attempts to table it bypassed the rules and procedures of the parliament, and that it ultimately was an obstacle toward fulfilling the goals enshrined in Vision 2016. Ahmed also commended lawmakers for countering the motion, and applauded the House of the People's leadership for acknowledging that the motion was an impediment on the legislature's functions and instead calling for reconciliatory dialogue to resolve the impasse.

A meeting between the heads of the federal government and a delegation from the League of Arab States, led by Kuwait's deputy prime minister and minister of foreign affairs Sabah Al-Khalid Al-Sabah, took place in Mogadishu on December 4 to discuss the parliamentary motion and Arab League business. On 6 December, the Federal Parliament again convened to hold the vote of confidence. 153 of the present MPs voted in favor of the motion, 80 voted against it, and 2 abstained, thereby ending Ahmed's term as Prime Minister of Somalia. According to the constitution, President Mohamud must appoint a replacement premier within a month.

On 17 December 2014, President Mohamud appointed former premier Omar Abdirashid Ali Sharmarke as Ahmed's replacement at prime minister. Ahmed accepted the transfer, thanked his staff for their work, and called on them to assist the incoming premier.

==== National Electoral Commission ====
In November 2014, Prime Minister Ahmed chaired an extraordinary Cabinet meeting in Mogadishu, during which the Council of Ministers unanimously passed a law establishing the independent National Electoral Commission. According to Deputy Prime Minister Ridwan Hersi Mohamed, the new legislation constitutes a significant step toward realizing the progressive and democratic goals within Vision 2016, including managing general elections.

==== Boundary and Federalization Commission ====
In November 2014, Ahmed chaired a special Council of Ministers meeting in the capital, during which the Cabinet unanimously passed a law establishing the Boundary and Federalization Commission. According to Deputy Prime Minister Ridwan Hersi Mohamed, the new bill will facilitate the nationwide federalization process and represents another milestone toward realizing Vision 2016. The Boundary and Federalization Commission is mandated with determining the boundaries of the country's constituent Federal Member States, as well as arbitrating between these regional states on their respective jurisdiction.

=== Foreign policy ===
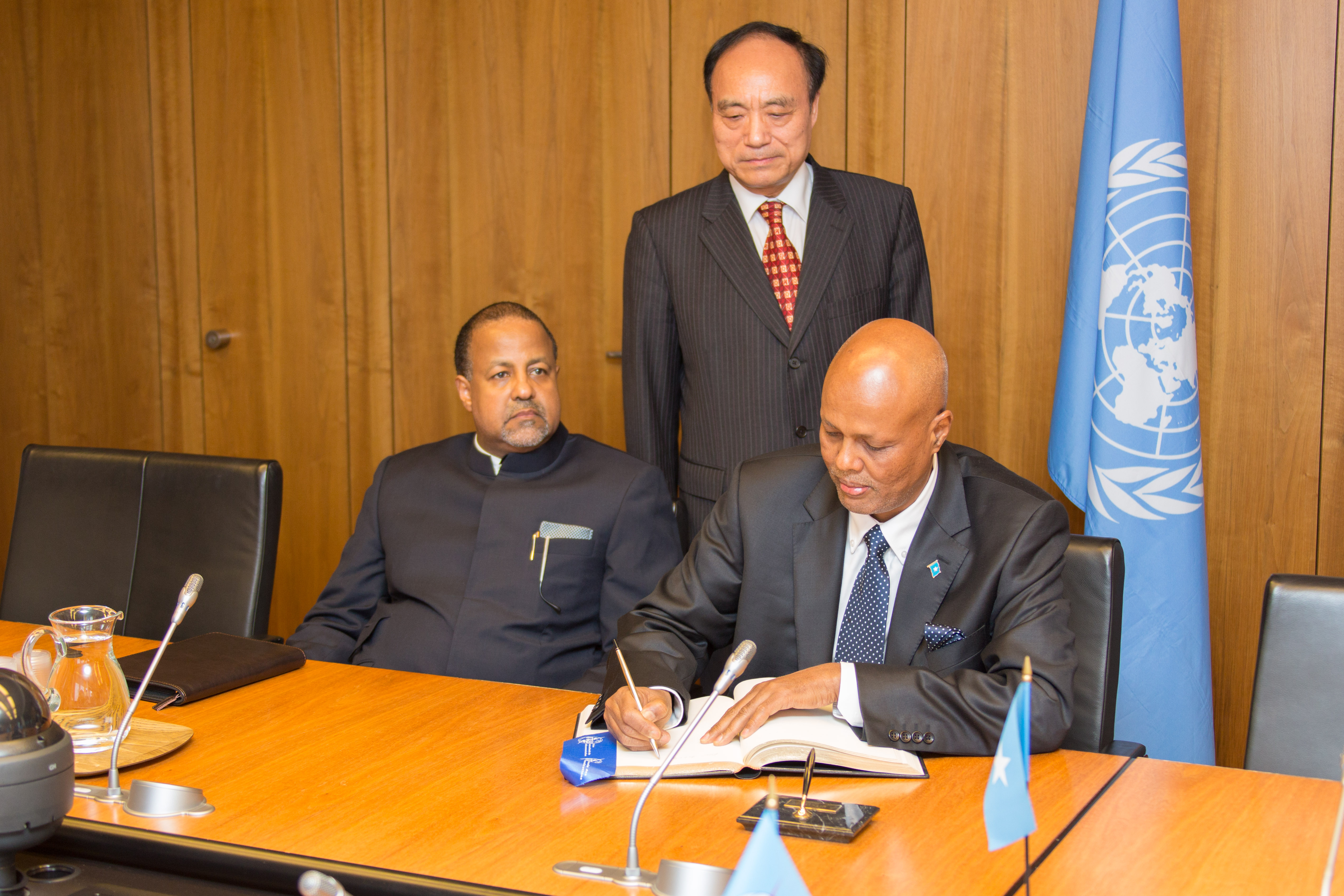
Prime Minister Ahmed at the International Telecommunication Union headquarters in Geneva with Ambassador of Djibouti Mohamed Siad Doualeh and ITU Deputy Secretary-General Houlin Zhao.

==== Somalia-Ethiopia cooperative agreements ====
In February 2014, Prime Minister Ahmed led a Somali delegation in Addis Ababa, where the visiting officials met with Ethiopian prime minister Hailemariam Desalegn to discuss strengthening bilateral relations between Somalia and Ethiopia. Ahmed commended Ethiopia's role in the ongoing peace and stabilization process in Somalia as well as its support against the Al-Shabaab militant group. He likewise welcomed the Ethiopian military's decision to join AMISOM. For his part, Hailemariam Desalegn pledged his administration's continued support for the peace and stabilization efforts in Somalia, as well as its preparedness to assist in initiatives aiming to build up the Somali security forces through experience-sharing and training. He also suggested that Somalia and Ethiopia should increase bilateral trade and investment. Additionally, Hailemariam Desalegn described the growing ties between both nations as a break from the counter-productive policies of past administrations, marking instead the opening of a new chapter where mutual stability is beneficial. The meeting concluded with a tripartite Memorandum of Understanding agreeing to promote partnership and cooperation, including a cooperative agreement to develop the police force, a second cooperative agreement covering the information field, and a third cooperative agreement on the aviation sector.

==== Somalia-UAE bilateral cooperation ====
In March 2014, Prime Minister of Somalia Ahmed began an official three-day visit to the United Arab Emirates to discuss strengthening bilateral cooperation between the two nations. During talks with UAE deputy prime minister and minister of presidential affairs Sheikh Mansour bin Zayed bin Sultan Al Nahyan, the Emirati authorities emphasized their commitment to the ongoing post-conflict reconstruction process in Somalia. They also pledged to assist in capacity building and the rehabilitation of government institutions.

==== ILO conventions ====
In March 2014, Prime Minister Ahmed addressed the International Labour Organization (ILO) at its headquarters in Geneva, Switzerland. The meeting concluded with Ahmed ratifying three core ILO conventions on behalf of the Federal Republic of Somalia: the Freedom of Association and Protection of the Right to Organise Convention, the Worst Forms of Child Labour Convention, and the Right to Organise and Collective Bargaining Convention. Ahmed also engaged Somalia in the Decent Work Program, which aims to protect workers' basic rights as well as develop sustainable employment opportunities, particularly for youth. According to the prime minister, the foregoing is part of the broader post-conflict reconstruction process in Somalia, with the government striving to establish an institutional framework facilitating sustainable economic and social development. To this end, Ahmed indicated that his administration was prioritizing the implementation of a Somali-owned state building process for peace, harmonization of the traditional setting, ensuring fully inclusive political engagement and fair access to resources, institutionalization of the promotion and protection of human rights in agreement with the Paris principles, and integration of the National Stabilisation Plan, New Deal Compact, Post Transition Human Rights Road Map, and Decent Work Program. Additionally, Ahmed and his delegation had a working lunch with the ILO Director General Guy Ryder, during which the officials stressed the importance of bilateral and multilateral cooperation. Ahmed subsequently provided a briefing of current developments in Somalia and ongoing operations against Al-Shabaab to Geneva's Friends of Somalia, a cross-regional member states group within the UN system that was chaired at that time by Karen Pierce who was UK ambassador to UN Missions in Geneva.

==== Somalia-EU National Indicative Programme ====
In June 2014, Prime Minister Ahmed and the European Commissioner for Development Andris Piebalgs signed in Brussels the first National Indicative Programme (NIP) between Somalia and the European Union in 25 years. The NIP is a work program earmarked for every Africa, the Caribbean and the Pacific (ACP) member state that is a party to the Cotonou Agreement. Effective from 2014 to 2020, the National Indicative Programme defines measurable objectives and target groups, initiatives for meeting those benchmarks, the nature and scope of supporting mechanisms, donor contribution(s), expected outcomes, and an implementation timetable. In the context of Somalia, the NIP is officially aligned with the priorities and objectives outlined in the New Deal Compact of 2013. According to Ahmed, Commissioner Piebalgs agreed to empower and directly support the Somali federal government's main public functions through multi-partner funds. He also suggested that this could encourage EU member states to fulfill the commitments that they had made to Somalia. Additionally, the EU Special Envoy Michele Cervone d'Urso indicated that the European Union has pledged 286 million EUR (US$400 million) toward the ongoing reconstruction process in Somalia, and that the National Indicative Programme serves as a realization of the country's recent accession to the Cotonou Agreement. In 2014, 100 million EUR from the 11th European Development Fund (EDF) and the Stability Instrument are to be set aside for institutionalization, peace building, and humanitarian and educational support. The mechanisms within the Somali Development and Reconstruction Facility (SDRF) are also slated to be used to carry out programs wherever necessary.

==== Eastern Africa Standby Force ====
In June 2014, Prime Minister Ahmed signed an agreement during an African Union summit in Equatorial Guinea, which enlists Somalia among the member states in the prospective Eastern Africa Standby Force. The EASF was conceived to address security challenges and threats in the wider region. Although its status at the time of signing was limited to an earlier Memorandum of Understanding between the signatory countries, leaders present at the June summit's side meeting agreed to go forward with the plans. Ahmed hailed the agreement and similar accords as symbols that Somalia's post-conflict recovery was progressing. A follow-up meeting on troop contributions from the EASF's member nations is slated for August of the year.

==== London security conference ====
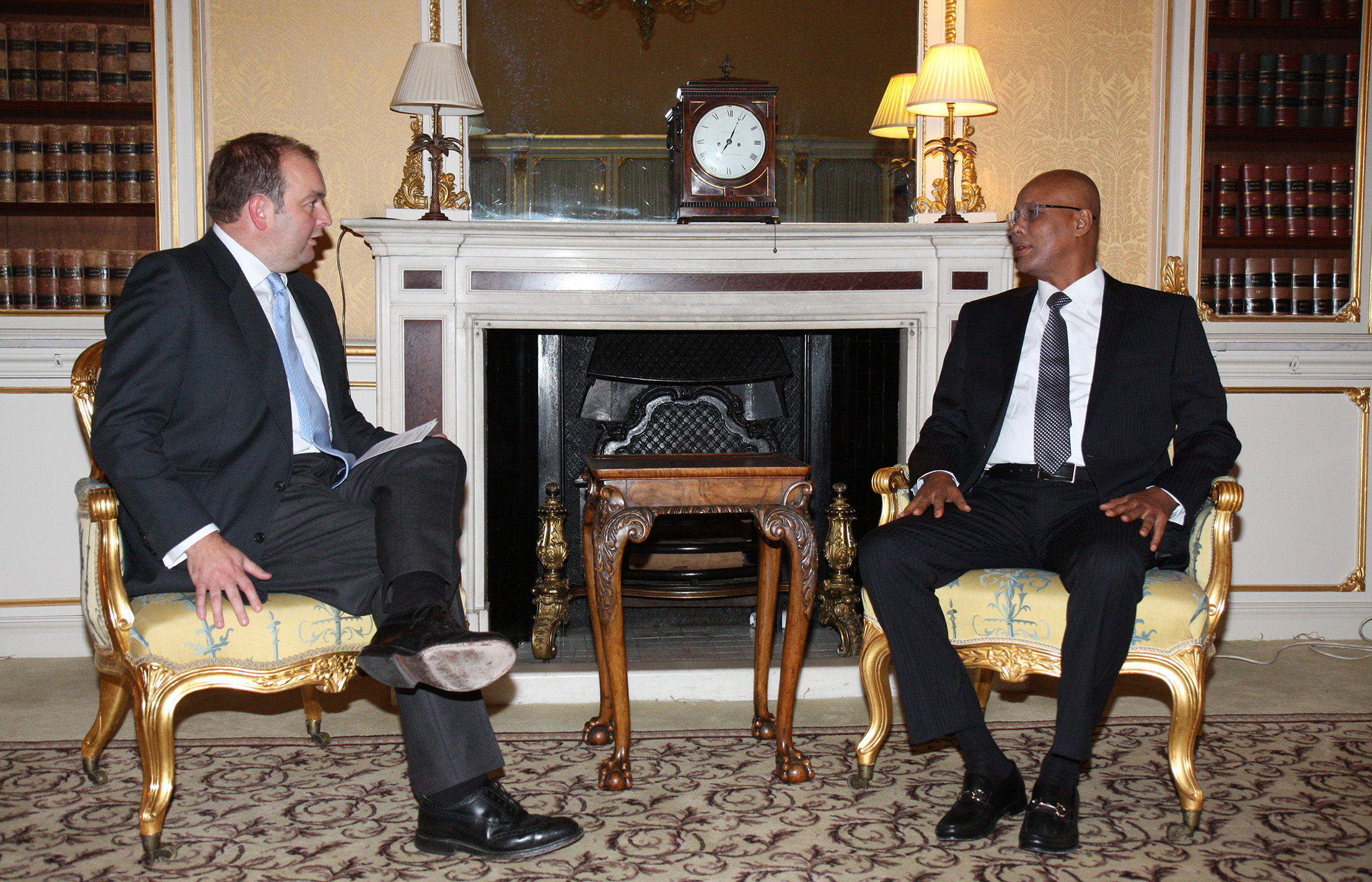
Former Prime Minister Ahmed with UK Foreign Office Minister James Duddridge at the London security conference, 2014.

In September 2014, Prime Minister Ahmed led a Somali government delegation at an international conference in London. The summit, hosted by the British government and opened by UK prime minister David Cameron, was centered on rebuilding the Somali National Army and strengthening the security sector in Somalia. It was also attended by Minister of Information Mustafa Duhulow, Minister of Defence Mohamed Sheikh Hassan, Chief of the Somali National Army Major General Dahir Adan Elmi, and other senior officials. Ahmed presented to the participants his administration's plan for the development of Somalia's military, as well as fiscal planning, human rights protection, arms embargo compliance, and ways to integrate regional militias. He likewise briefed the attendees on the Somali government-led Operation Indian Ocean against Al-Shabaab. According to Ahmed, the conference also aimed to optimize financial support for the Somali military. Cameron in turn indicated that the meeting sought to outline a long-term security plan to strength Somalia's army, police and judiciary.

==== UN Convention on the Rights of the Child ====
In September 2014, Minister of Justice and Constitutional Affairs Farah Sh. Abdulkadir Mohamed announced that the Federal Government of Somalia had adopted the UN Convention on the Rights of the Child. According to Prime Minister Ahmed, Somalia had initially signed the agreement in May 2002, later committed to adopt it in November 2013, and eventually honoured that pledge in September of the following year. The Federal Parliament is now slated to ratify the law.

== Somali Forum for Unity and Democracy ==
In February 2015, Ahmed participated in the Somali Forum for Unity and Democracy's first National Founders Conference at the organization's headquarters, the People's House, in Mogadishu. The SFUD provides the first nationwide consultation on domestic priorities, with the overall aim of meeting the Vision 2016 political roadmap's benchmarks and promoting reform based on engagement between government institutions, professionals and the general public. It is composed of various politicians, civil society stakeholders and other notable local figures. The Forum's founders concurrently elected Ahmed as the SFUD's new chairman, along with former Minister of Health Ali Mohamed Mohamud as Secretary-General, and 2012 presidential candidate Abdurahman Maalin Abdullahi, former deputy prime minister Hussein Arab Isse and prominent scholar Abdishukur Sheikh Hassan Fiqi as Deputy Chairs. They also reaffirmed the Forum's founding principles, and deliberated on and approved the organization's initial six-month program as well as its Provisional Constitution.

== Professional memberships ==
Ahmed is a member of several professional associations and networks. Among these are:

- Arab-African International Development Professionals (AAIDP)
- Canadian Economics Society
- Inter-Agency Donor Group (IADG)
- International Livestock and Pastoralism Development Network (ILPN)

Political offices
Preceded by Abdi Farah Shirdon	Prime Minister of Somalia; 2013–2014	Succeeded by Omar Abdirashid Ali Sharmarke
