= Parliament Building (Somalia) =

Parliament Building (Somalia) may refer to several different buildings in Mogadishu that have served as the seat of the legislature:

- Casa del Fascio (Mogadishu), a colonial-era building that was repurposed to become the first seat of the Somali parliament after independence.
- People's Assembly Building (Somalia), the second parliament building, completed in 1972 and destroyed in the Somali Civil War.
- House of the People (Somalia), the current seat of the Federal Parliament of Somalia.

== See also ==
- Federal Parliament of Somalia (the institution)
