= 2017 Somali presidential election =

← 2012	8 February 2017	2022 →
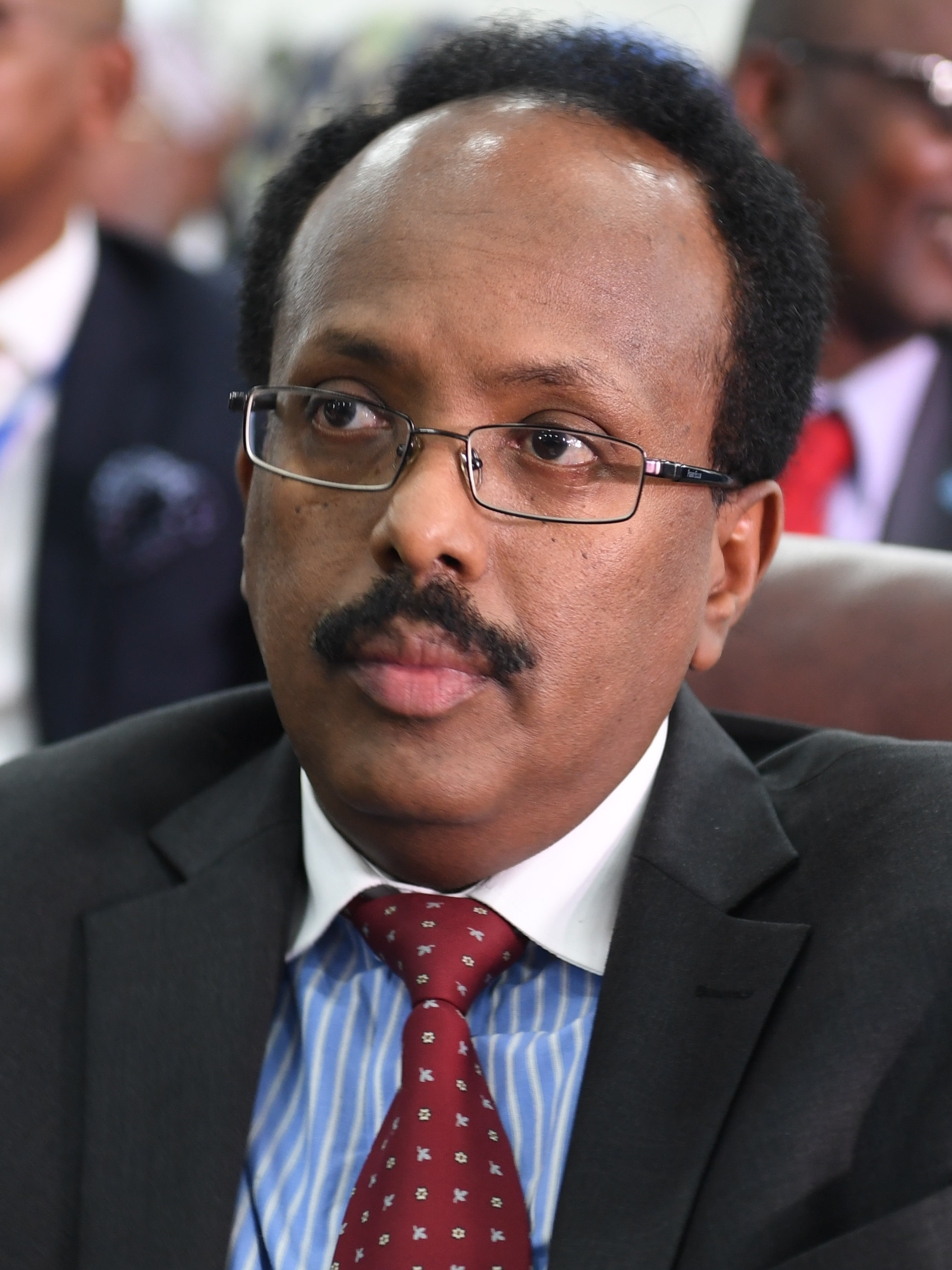

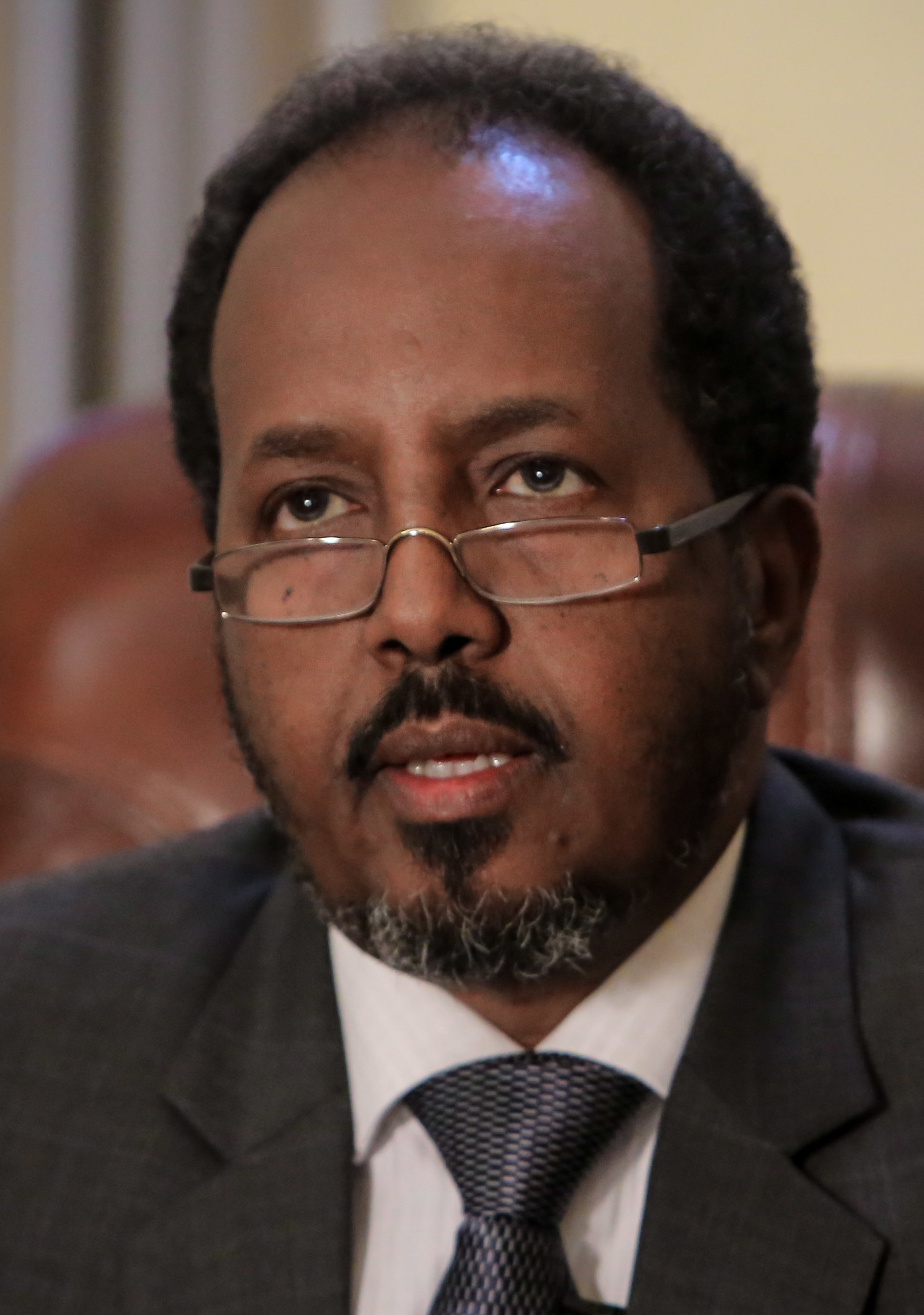

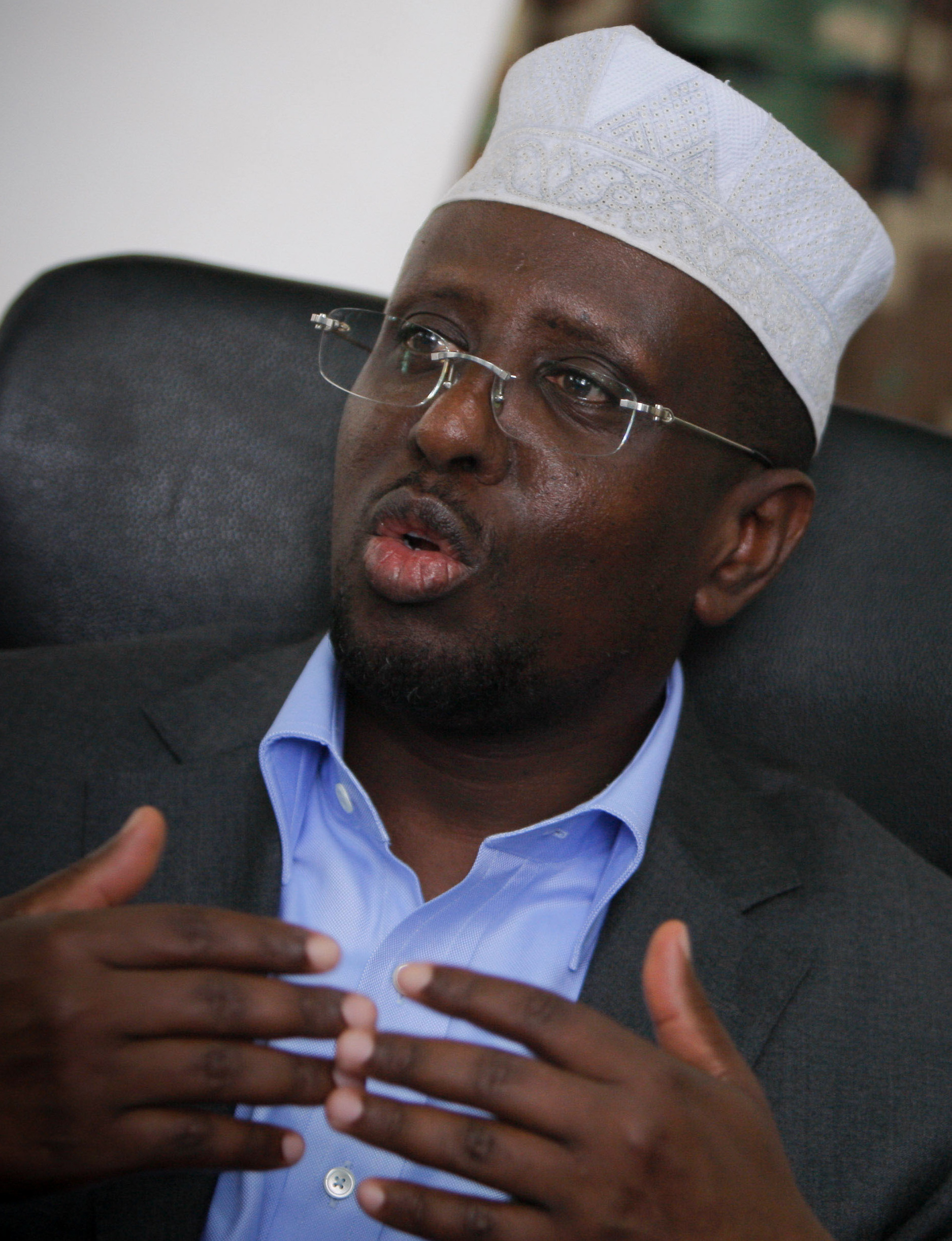
Nominee	Mohamed Abdullahi Mohamed	Hassan Sheikh Mohamud	Sharif Sheikh Ahmed
Party	TPP	UPD	Independent
Electoral vote	184	97	45
Percentage	56.44%	29.75%	13.80%
President before election
Hassan Sheikh Mohamud
UPD
Elected President
Mohamed Abdullahi Mohamed
TPP

Indirect presidential elections were held in Somalia on 8 February 2017. Members of parliament elected in the autumn-2016 parliamentary election elected former Prime Minister Mohamed Abdullahi Mohamed to the post of President of Somalia for a four-year term.

The presidential elections had been planned for August 2016 and promised to be a one-person, one-vote national poll, but had been postponed several times and shifted to an electoral college system due to security concerns. On 26 January 2017, the election was set for 8 February, with candidates required to register by 29 January. The election was held in an airport hangar at Aden Adde International Airport, Mogadishu.

Mohamed was declared president in a peaceful transition of power after incumbent President Hassan Sheikh Mohamud conceded defeat and congratulated the victor.

== Security ==
Due to the ongoing civil war, security for the ballot was a significant concern. The vote was initially planned to be held at a Mogadishu police academy but was moved to the more secure Aden Adde International Airport, considered as the safest place in Somalia's Capital. On the voting day, traffic was banned in the city, schools were closed and flights to and from the airport were suspended.

== Electoral system ==
In the previous presidential election in 2012, the president was elected by a parliament that had been picked by 135 elders. Plans in 2016–2017 for a full election involving all adult Somalis were scrapped due to security concerns relating to the ongoing civil war. The election costs were 60% funded by donor countries in Europe, the United States and Japan, with the remainder from the Somali government and candidate registration fees.

The president was elected by the 328 members of the Lower House and Upper House of the Somali Parliament. The Parliament's members were elected in the 2016 parliamentary election which itself was limited to 14,025 clan elder-appointed delegates. The election's foreign financiers described the extension of the franchise as a "modest step forward".

The procedure for the election—a form of runoff voting—is outlined in section 89 of the Constitution of Somalia. There were over twenty registered candidates in the first round of voting.

== Bribery ==
The parliamentary election was considered by experts to be one of the most corrupt political events in the history of the country. Amid widespread reports of vote-buying, investigators estimated at least $20 million had been paid as bribes. Several candidates paid political unknowns to run against them to add a veneer of legitimacy to their races, and analysts have said that Al-Shabaab did not interfere with the election, as the corruption involved made the group look good by comparison. Much of the money used came from foreign nations with interests in Somalia, which hoped that the candidates they supported monetarily would help advance their interests. Once seated, the parliament voted on who would become president.

== Candidates ==
A total of 23 or 24 candidates (Note: The original number of candidates varies slightly between reports; reports 24, reports 23.) declared themselves, though withdrawals—including that of Abdirahman Farole—reduced the field to 21 by the time of the vote. The field included the incumbent President Hassan Sheikh Mohamud, incumbent Prime Minister Omar Sharmarke, former President Sharif Sheikh Ahmed, former Prime Minister Mohamed Abdullahi Mohamed and Somalia's former envoy to Kenya Mohamed Ali Nur among others.

== Results ==
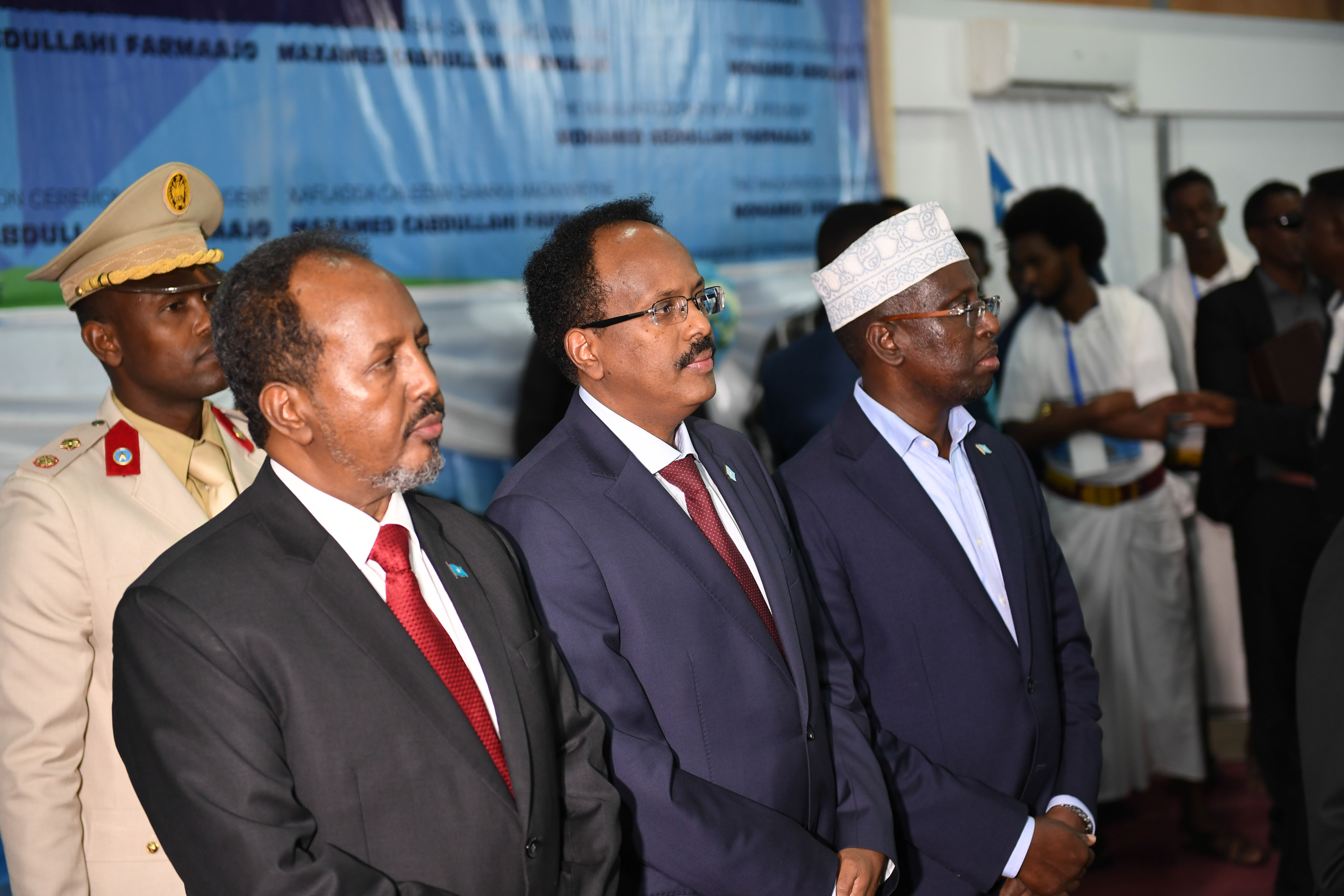
Former Presidents of Somalia, Hassan Sheikh Mohamud (left) and Sharif Sheikh Ahmed (right), stand side by side with the new president of Somalia, Mohamed Abdullahi Mohamed, at the inauguration ceremony in Mogadishu on February 22, 2017

No candidate achieved the required two-thirds of votes to win in the first round, so the top four candidates (Hassan Sheikh Mohamud, Mohamed Abdullahi Mohamed, Sharif Sheikh Ahmed, and Omar Abdirashid Sharmarke) advanced to the second round. Omar Abdirashid Sharmarke then dropped out, reducing the field to three candidates. No candidate reached the required threshold in the second round of voting, and third-place Ahmed was eliminated. Hassan Sheikh Mohamud conceded defeat, negating the need for a final vote.

Mohamed became the President of Somalia after receiving 184 out of the total 326 valid votes by members of the Somali Parliament, thereby defeating former president Hassan Sheikh Mohamud. He ran against 19 opponents and was sworn into office on 16 February.

Candidate	First round		Second round	
Candidate	Votes	%	Votes	%
Hassan Sheikh Mohamud	88	26.91	97	29.75
Mohamed Abdullahi Mohamed	72	22.02	184	56.44
Sharif Sheikh Ahmed	48	14.68	45	13.80
Omar Sharmarke	37	11.31		
Abdulkadir Osoble Ali	25	7.65		
Said Abdullahi Deni	18	5.50		
Abdullahi Ali Ahmed	14	4.28		
Abdirahman Abdishakur Warsame	9	2.75		
Abdinasir Abdille Mohamed	6	1.83		
Ali Haji Warsame	3	0.92		
Haji Mohamed Yassin Ismail	2	0.61		
Mohamed Nur	2	0.61		
Jabril Ibrahim Abdulle	1	0.31		
Said Issa Mohamud	1	0.31		
Mohamed Ahmed Jabarti	1	0.31		
Mohamed Ali Nur	0	0.00		
Bashir Raghe Shiiraar	0	0.00		
Mohamed Abdirizak Mohamud	0	0.00		
Abdullahi Elmoge Hersi	0	0.00		
Ahmed Mohamed Abdi	0	0.00		
Total	327	100.00	326	100.00
Valid votes	327	99.70	326	99.39
Invalid/blank votes	1	0.30	2	0.61
Total votes	328	100.00	328	100.00
Registered voters/turnout	329	99.70	329	99.70
Source: Safer World
