= Speaker of the Senate of Somalia =

Speaker of the senate of Somalia
- Afhayeenka Aqalka Sare
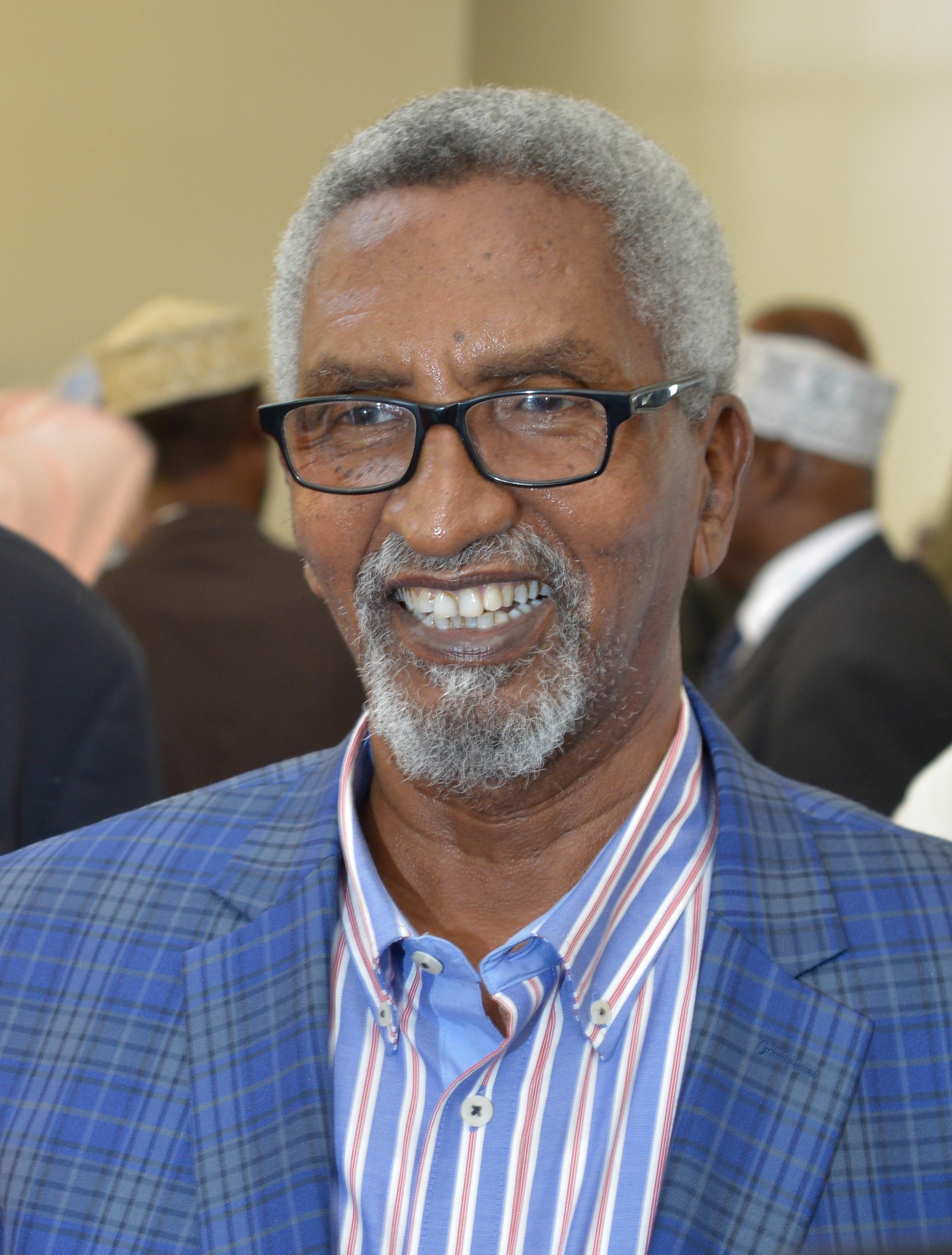
- Incumbent; Abdi Hashi Abdullahi since 26 April 2022
- Style: The Honourable
- Residence: Villa Hargeisa, Mogadishu, Somalia
- Appointer: The Electorate
- Term length: 4 years, renewable once
- Inaugural holder: Abdi Hashi Abdullahi
- Formation: 29 February 2016
- Deputy: Abdullahi Ali Hersi Tima-Cadde

The following is a list of speakers of the Senate of Somalia, the upper house of the Federal Parliament of Somalia. There have been 2 officials speakers of the Senate since the office was created in 2016.

The Speaker of the Senators is Abdi Hashi Abdullahi since 22 January 2017 and re-elected 2021-2022.

== History ==
The Senate came into existence in 2016 when Somalia shifted to a bicameral legislature and formed its 10th Parliament. This was after Art.61 (3) and Art.71 were mandated that brought the Upper House into existence, thus discharging the responsibilities of the 9th parliament.

The Senate consists of 54 senators from the different Federal Member States of the country. The Senate is composed of senators, each of whom represents a single state in its entirety.

The electorate expanded from 135 male elders in 2012, to more than 14,000 including 30 percent of women. The Senate of Somalia represents the Federal Member States and is responsible for the facilitating Federalism Principles, Initiating and amending laws, scrutinising the bills and carrying out oversight functions.

== List of speakers ==
Mohamed Ali Yusuf served from 11 August 2021 to 26 April 2022 as acting Speaker.

| No. | Portrait | Name (birth–death) | Term of office | | | Party | Deputy speaker | Election |
| No. | Portrait | Name (birth–death) | Took office | Left office | Time in office | Party | Deputy speaker | Election |
|---|---|---|---|---|---|---|---|---|
| 1 | | Abdi Hashi Abdullahi (1946) | 22 January 2017 | 10 August 2021 | 4 years, 201 days | Independent | Abshir Bukhari | 2016 |
| — | | Mohamed Ali Yusuf (1944–2024) acting | 11 August 2021 | 26 April 2022 | 258 days | Independent | Vacant | — |
| 1 | | Abdi Hashi Abdullahi | 26 April 2022 | Incumbent | 4 years, 135 days | Independent | Abdullahi Timacade | 2021–2022 |
