= 2016 Somali parliamentary election =

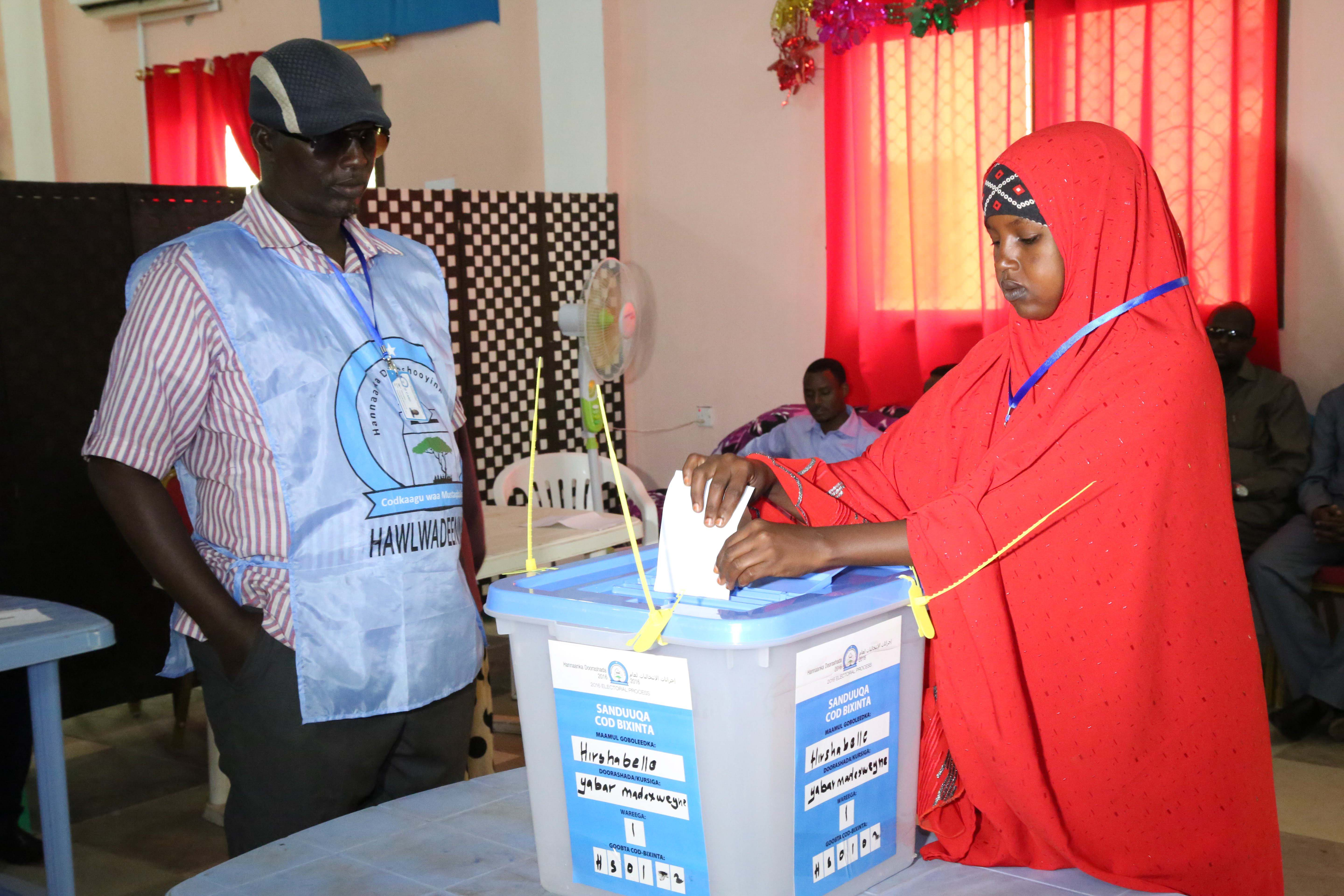
A woman delegate from Hirshabelle state casts her vote in Jowhar during the electoral process to choose members of the House of the People of the Federal Parliament of Somalia

Indirect parliamentary elections were held in Somalia in October and November 2016. The Upper House was elected on 10 October, with voting taking place for the House of the People, which was elected between 23 October and 10 November 2016. They were the first elections since 1984, and the newly elected Parliament was due to elect the President on 30 November. However, the presidential elections were delayed and eventually held on 8 February 2017, when the MPs and Senators elected Mohamed Abdullahi Mohamed as president.

The ongoing civil war prevented an election with full suffrage from taking place, and instead an indirect election was held, with 14,025 delegates, themselves appointed by clan elders, electing the Parliament.

== Background ==
The term of the Parliament of the Federal Government of Somalia, sworn in in 2012, expired in 2016. In 2012 only 135 elders were part of the electoral process. For the 2016 elections the number was increased to 14,025. Only limited suffrage was granted as the election model relied on clan elders and community representatives rather than a popular vote. The UN envoy to the country warned that al-Shabaab would try to derail the elections.

== Electoral system ==
The 54 members of the Upper House were elected by the state assemblies.

The 275 members of the Lower House were elected by 14,025 delegates from different regions in the country. Each MP was elected by an electoral college of 51 people appointed by the 135 Traditional Elders. From the 51 delegates 16 were supposed to be women, 10 from the youth community and the remaining 25 being members of the civil society. From the 275 MPs, 69 were chosen in Baidoa while the remaining were from other cities.
