= Zamzam Dahir Mohamud =

Somalian politician

- Zamzam Daahir Maxamuud

Senator
- Incumbent
- Assumed office 2023

Zamzam Dahir Mohamud (Somali: Zamzam Daahir Maxamuud) is a politician from Galmudug. In 2023, she became the first woman to be elected to the Senate of Somalia. She was elected to represent Galmudug state. Galmudug has six seats in the senate, two of which are reserved for women as part of a 30% parliamentary quota in Somalia.

== See also ==
- List of members of the Federal Parliament of Somalia
