= List of members of the Federal Parliament of Somalia =

This is a list of members of the 11th Parliament of Somalia, elected in 2022 Somali parliamentary election. It covers both Upper House (Senate) and Lower House (House of the People) members in the national bicameral legislature, based in Mogadishu, the capital of Somalia. the listed Members of Parliament (MPs) are scheduled to serve from 2022 to 2026.

== List of members of the Federal Parliament ==
=== Upper House ===
As of 10 April 2022, the official list of members of the upper house which currently stands at 49 is as follows:

- Abdirizak Osman Hassan Abdirizak Jurile
- Abdi Ahmed Dhuhulow
- Abdikafi Moalim Hassan
- Abdifatah Hassan Roble
- Abdullahi Ali Abukar
- Abdikarim Mohamed Hassan
- Abdirahman Farole
- Abdirizak Ahmed Ali
- Abdisalam haji Mohamud Dhere
- Abdiwahid Elmi Omar
- Abdullahi Abdi Garuun
- Abdulahi Ibrahim Yusuf
- Abdullahi Sheikh Ismail (Fartaag)
- Abshir Mohamed Ahmed (Bukhari)
- Abukar Ahmed Hashi
- Adan Abdi Adan
- Ahmed Abdi Haabsade
- Ahmed Abdihafid Mohamed (Bulsho)
- Ahmed Hashi Mohamud
- Ahmed Moalim Omar Ahmed
- Botan Barre Samatar
- Fadumo Hassan Adam Gariyow
- Dr. Farhan Ali Hussein
- Fartun Abdikadir Farah Karama
- Hassan Farah Hujale
- Hodan Mohamud Osman
- Hussein Ali Haji Abdalla
- hussein mohamud hashi adan
- Hussein Sheikh Mohamud
- Iftiin Hassan Iman
- Ilyas Ali Hassan
- Jawahir Ahmed Elmi
- Mahdi Dahir Sheikh Nur
- Mohamud Ahmed Mohamud
- Mohamed Amin Sheikh Osman
- Mowlid Hussein Guhad
- Prof. Mohamed Osman Farah
- Mohamud Hussein Rage
- Muhyadin Sh. Ali Jama
- Muno Omar Hassan
- Muse Sudi Yalahow
- Mustafa Mohamoud Qodah
- Naima Ibrahim Yusuf
- Omar Abdirashid Ali Sharmarke
- Osman Ahmed Maow
- Prof/Dr. Osman Mohamud Dufle
- Saido Hassan Osman
- Shukri Aden Mohamed
- Timiro Mohamed Ali
- Yusuf Gelle Ugas
- Zamzam Dahir Mohamud
- Zamzam Ibrahim Ali
- Samira Mohamed Khalif

=== House of the People ===
The House of the People, or Lower House, is eventually expected to comprise 275 MPs. As of 10 April 2022, the official list of House of the People MPs which currently stands at 261 is as follows:

- Asha-Kos Mohamud Omar
- Abdalla Haji Ali Ahmed
- Dr. Abdi Ali Hassan
- Abdi Shire Jama
- Abdiaziz Abdilahi Mohamed (Hukun)
- Abdiaziz Elmi Ali
- Abdiaziz Hassan Mohamed
- Abdulasis Mohamed Mohamud (Qambi)
- Abdiaziz Salah Arman
- Abdifatah Ismael Tahir
- Abdifitah Kasim Mohamud
- Abdifatah Mohamed Ali
- Abdifatah Mohamed Ibrahim
- Abdihakim Moallim Ahmed Malin
- Abdikarim Khalif Abdi Dhala
- Abdinasir Seid Musse
- Abdirahman Ahmed Suge
- Dr. Abdirahman Duale Beyle
- Abdirahman Idan Yonis
- Abdirahman Kulmiye Hersi
- Abdirahman Mohamed Abdulle
- Abdirahman Mohamed Hussein
- Abdirashid Dahir Gabobe
- Abdirashid Mohamed Hidig
- Abdirashid Mohamed Ahmed
- Abdirashid Mohamud Hassan Abdi
- Abdirisak Dahir Mohamud
- Abdirizak Ahmed Mohamed (Jindi)
- Abdirizak Omar Mohamed
- Abdisabir Nur Shuriye
- Abdisatar Abdisalam Sh. Hassan
- Abdishakur Ali Mire
- Abdiwahab Ugas Hussein Ugas Khalif
- Abdiweli Ibrahim Sh. Mudey
- Abdiwelli Mohamed Qanyare
- Abdo Mah Farah
- Abdukadir Aden Nur
- Dr. Abdulaziz Abdullahi Yusuf (Dh.qol)
- Abdulkadir Arabow Ibrahim
- Abdulkadir Hassan SheikhAden
- Abdulkadir Mohamed Osman
- Abdulkadir Osoble Ali
- Abdulkadir Sh. Ali Ibraahim (Baqdaadi)
- Abdullahi Abukar Haji
- Abdullahi Ali Ahmed
- Abdullahi Bidhan Warsame
- Abdullahi Bile Noor
- Abdullahi Godah Barre
- Abdullahi Hussein Ali (Abdalla)
- Abdullahi Mohamed Ali
- Abdullahi Mohamed Nur
- Abdullahi Olad Roble
- Abdullahi Omar Abshir
- Abdullahi Osman Duale
- Abdullahi Sheikh Ismail Ali
- Abdullahi Yusuf Hassan (Alankey)
- Abdurahman Adan Ibrahim (Ibbi)
- Adam Isak Ali
- Adan Ali Hassan
- Adan Ibrahim Dhayow
- Ahmed Dhimbil Roble
- Ahmed Haji Mohamed (Taaw)
- Ahmed Ismail Mohamed
- Ahmed Ismail Shabel
- Ahmed Mayow Abdulle
- Ahmed Moalim Fiqi
- Ahmed Mohamed Ahmed
- Ahmed Mohamed Jama
- Ahmed Mohamud Sh. Muhamed
- Ahmed Omar Islow
- Ahmed Osman Ibrahim
- Ali Abdi Osman
- Ali Aden Hussei
- Ali Ahmed Jama Jangali
- Ali Ahmed Sharif Osman
- Ali Mohamed Muse
- Ali Mohamed Omar
- Ali Osman Hersi
- Ali Sheikh Mohamed Nur
- Ali Yusuf Ali Hoosh
- Ali Yusuf Osman
- Amina Hassan Ali
- Amina Mohamed Abdi
- Amina Omar Jama
- Amina Sheikh Osman
- Anab Hassan Elmi
- Asha-Kos Mohamud Omar
- Bihi Iman Egeh
- Bootaan Isse Alim
- Burhan Adan Omar
- Dahabo Susow Mohamud
- Dahir Abdi Abdullahi (Dr. Go)
- Dahir Amin Jesow
- Dahir Mohamud Muse
- Dallays Hassan Adan
- Daud Mohamed Omar
- Deka Hussein Hassan
- Deko Said Hassan
- Dhahar Ali Farah
- Duniyo Mohamed Ali
- Dr. Elmi Mohamud Nur
- Elmi Omar Elmi (Caynsane)
- Faduma Ismail Hussein
- Faduma Hassan Ali
- Fadumma Farah Ibrahim
- Fadumo Odawa Rage
- Fahma Ahmed Nur
- Faisal Abdille Guled
- Farah Abdi Hassan
- Farhia Hassan Ahmed
- Farah Sheikh Abdulkadir
- Farhia Mumin Ali
- Farhio Mohamud Dhaqane
- Fawzia Mohamed Sheikh
- Fawzia Yusuf H. Adam
- Faysal Omar Guled
- Hamza Said Hamza
- Hamza Sheikh Hussein
- Hani Mohamed Aden
- Hanifa Mohamed Ibrahim
- Hashim Noor Aden
- Hassan Abdi Ismail
- Hassan Abdinur Abdi
- Hassan Ali Mohamed
- Hassan Ibrahim Mohamed
- Hassan Moalim Hussein
- Hassan Moallim Mohamud Sh. Ali
- Hassan Osman Hussein (Qoryooley)
- Hawa Mohamed Adan
- Hawa Yusuf Ahmed
- Hersi Adan Roble
- Hiis Hassan Adam
- Dr. Hussein Abdi Elmi
- Hussein Arab Essa
- Hussein Osman Hussein
- Hussein Mohamud Sheikh Hussein
- Hussein Qasim Yusuf
- Ibrahim Mohamed Hussein Bule
- Ibrahim Isak Yarow
- Idiris Abdi Taktar
- Ikran Aden Absuge
- Ikran Yusuf Hersi
- Iman Abdullahi Ali
- Isak Mohamed Mohamud (Aboow)
- Isgowe Derow Isak
- Ismail Abdirahman Sh. Bashiir
- Jama Mohamed Askar
- Jamal Hassan Ismail
- Jawahir Adawe Abdi
- Jeylani Nur Ikar
- Jibril Abdirashid Haji
- Khadijo Mohamed Diriye
- Khadra Mohamed Tukale
- Khalid Maow Abdulkadir
- Khaliif Abdi Omar (Xan Fresh )
- Khaliif Sheikh Abdulahi
- Liban Osman Abdirahman
- Lul Abdi Aden
- Liban Abdirahman sharif Salah (Liban doob )
- Mahad Abdalle Awad
- Mahad Mohamed Salad
- Mariam Aweis Jama
- Maryam Haji Abdi Gedi
- Maryan Ahmed Harun
- Maryan Arif Kasim
- Maryan Moalim Isak
- Maryan Mohamed Hussein
- Maryan Mohamud Isse
- Mina Hassan Mohamed
- Moalim Ali Adan
- Mohamed A. Mohamed (Garweyne)
- Mohamed Abdi Hayir Mareye
- Mohamed Abdi Mohamed Gandi
- Mohamed Abdikafi Mohamed
- Mohamed Abdullahi Farah
- Mohamed Abdulle Farah
- Mohamed Abukar Islaw
- Mohamed Adan Moalim Ali
- Mohamed Ahmed Abtidoon
- Mohamed Ali Hussein
- Mohamed Ali Omar
- Mohamed Dirie Khalif
- Mohamed Hassan Ibrahim Qoone
- Mohamed Hassan Idiris
- Mohamed Hussein Isak (Afaraale)
- Mohamed Ibrahim Abdi
- Mohamed Isak Osman (Fanah)
- Mohamed Jama Mursal
- Mohamed Mursal Mohamud (Boorow)
- Mohamed Mursal Sheikh Abdurahman
- Mohamed Nur Iftin (Shambara)
- Mohamed Nureni Bakar
- Mohamed Omar Aimoy
- Mohamed Omar Arte
- Mohamed Omar Dalha
- Mohamed Said Abdilahi
- Mohamed Osman Jawari
- Mohamud Abdirahman Sheikh Farah (Beene Beene)
- Mohamud Abdullahi Ahmed
- Mohamud Siraji
- Mohamud Ali Magan
- Mohamud Ahmed Isse
- Mohamed Abdi Kadiye
- Mohamud Moalim Yahye
- Mohamud Mohamed Bono
- Mohamud Mohamed Jimale
- Mohamud Hayir Ibrahim
- Muna Khalif Sheikh Abu
- Muse Ahmed Ismail
- Muse Said Jama
- Mustafa Sh.Ali Duhulow
- Nadifa Adan Isak
- Nadifa Farah Jama
- Naima Mohamed Gaal
- Nuriya Adan Isse
- Omar Ismail Waberi
- Omar Osman Wasuge
- Osman Elmi Boqore
- Osman Haji Ali
- Osman Libah Ibrahim
- Osman Mohamed Abdi
- Qasim Mohamed Jama
- Rabaco Sheikh Nur
- Sadik Hirsi Warfa
- Sadio Muse Abdullahi
- Sadiq Abdikraim Haji Ibrahim
- Sadiya Yasin Haji Samatar
- Sadiyo Arays Isse
- Safio Hassan Nur
- Sagal Abdirisak Bihi
- Sahra Abdulkadir Abdirahman
- Sahra Haji Hussein Ali
- Sahra Jama Ali Qorshel
- Cabdulqadir Cali Caseyr
- Sandhere Mohamed Iftin
- Said Hassan Gedi
- Said Hussein Iid
- Said Mohamed Mohamud Haid
- Said Nur Qailie
- Saido Mohamed Hassan
- Salah Ahmed Jama
- Prof. Salim Aliyow Ibrow
- Samira Hassan Abdulle
- Samra Ibrahim Omar
- Sareda Mohamed Abdalla
- Sayid Ali Abdulkadir Moalim
- Sharif Mohamed Abdalla
- Sharif Shek Maye
- Sharmarke Saleban Burale
- Sheikh Aden Mohamed Nur (Modobe)
- Sheikh Nur Mohamed Hassan
- Sulaiman Mohamud Hashi
- Suuri Dirie Arab
- Swaqar Ibrahim Abdalla
- Ubah Tahlil Warsame
- Warsame Mohamed Hassan
- Yacqub Ali Mohamed
- Yurub Ahmed Raabi
- Yusuf Hayle Jimalle
- Abas Abdullahi Sheikh Siraji (Note: Reported killed on 4 May 2017 in an apparent friendly fire incident involving government forces. Investigation currently in progress.)
- Yusuf Hussein Ahmed
- Yusuf Ibrahim Afrah
- Zahra Yusuf Ige
- Zakarie Hassan Sh. Ali
- Zakarie Mohamud Haji Abdi
- Zakarie Data Internet
- Abdulkadir Dahir Adam
