= Guled Bihi Abdi =

Somali politician

Member of the Federal Parliament of Somalia
- Incumbent
- Assumed office 19 Dec 2021

Personal details
- Occupation: Politician

Guled Bihi Abdi (Somali: Guleed Biixi Cabdi), is a Somali politician who has served as a member of the Federal Parliament of Somalia since 2021.
