= Asha-Kos Mohamud Omar =

Somali politician

Asha-Koos Mohamud Omar on 25 January 2022.

Asha-Kos Mohamud Omar is a politician from Somalia who is a member of the Federal Parliament of Somalia.

== See also ==
- List of members of the Federal Parliament of Somalia
