= Mohamed Burale =

Somali politician and member of Parliament

Member of the Federal Parliament of Somalia
- Incumbent
- Assumed office 2 April 2022
- Majority: 65.35%

Personal details
- Born: 27 October 1982 (age 42); Beledweyne, Somalia
- Nickname: Raaxeeye

Mohamed Abdullahi Burale also known as Mohamed Burale or Raaxeeye (born 27 October 1982) is a Somali politician serving as a member of the Federal Parliament of Somalia since 2022. He won the election for this seat by receiving 66 votes in Beledweyne, the capital of Hiraan region.
