= Abdi Hashi Abdullahi =

Current Speaker of the Senate of Somalia

His Excellency Abdi Hashi Abdullahi
- Cabdi Xaashi Cabdullaahi
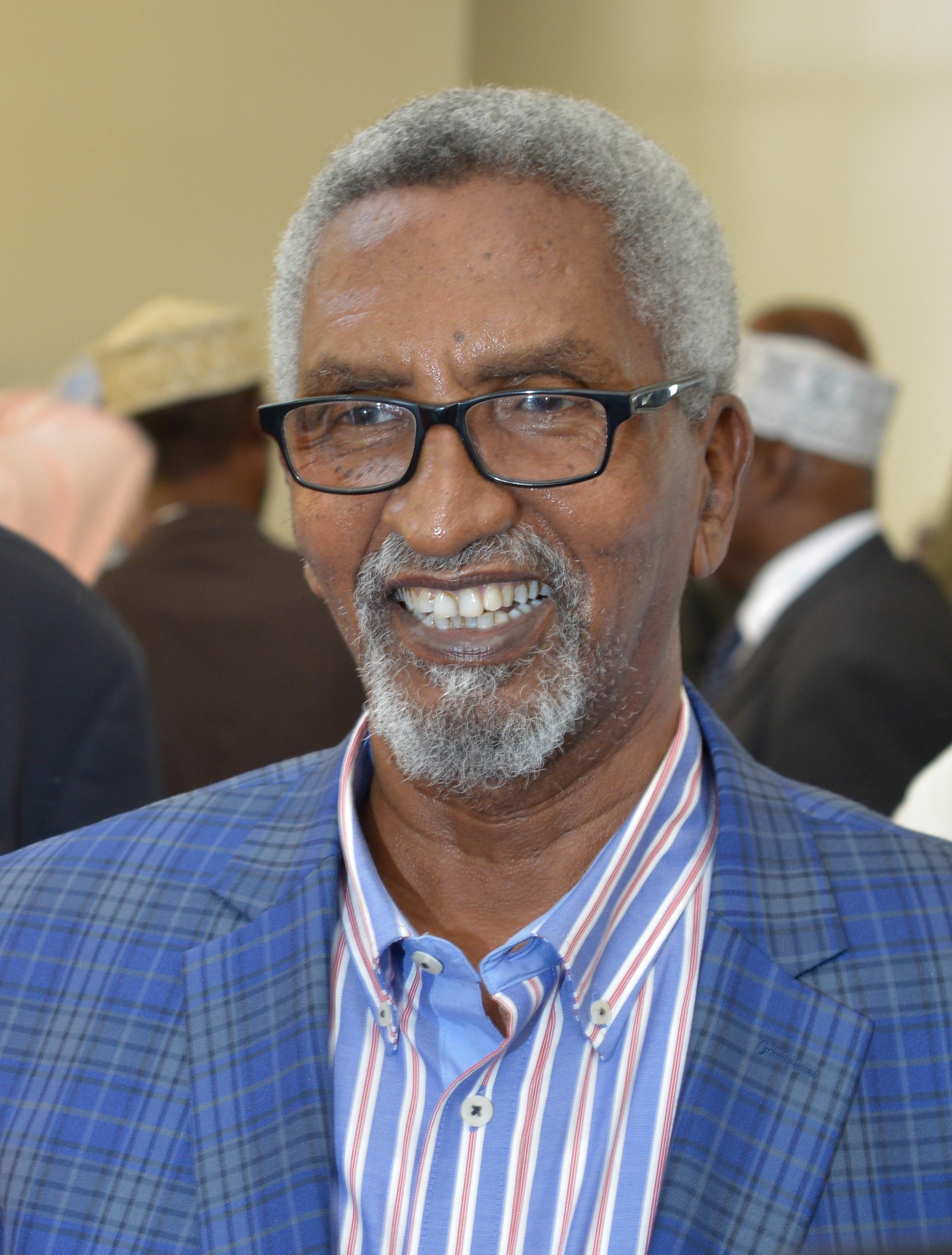

3rd Speaker of the Senate of Somalia
- Incumbent
- Assumed office 26 April 2022
- Preceded by: Mohamed Ali Yusuf
- Constituency: Somaliland

1st Speaker of the Senate of Somalia
- In office 22 January 2017 – 10 August 2021
- Preceded by: Office established
- Succeeded by: Mohamed Ali Yusuf

Minister of Heritage and Culture
- In office 2004–2006
- President: Abdullahi Yusuf Ahmed
- Prime Minister: Ali Mohamed Ghedi

Minister of Health
- In office 2008–2006
- President: Abdullahi Yusuf Ahmed
- Prime Minister: Ali Mohamed Ghedi

Personal details
- Born: 1 December 1946 (age 79) Babile, Italian East Africa

Abdi Hashi Abdullahi (Somali: Cabdi Xaashi Cabdullaahi; b. 1 December 1946, Arabic: عبدي حاشي عبدالله) is a Somali politician who has been elected twice to serve as the first Speaker of the Senate of Somalia representating Somaliland. He took the office on 22 January 2017. Previously, he was a former Minister of Heritage and Culture and Minister of Health in the Transitional Federal Government of Somalia.

== Personal life ==
He was born on 1 December 1946, in Babile town during Italian colony in Horn of Africa. Abdelahi hails from the Sa'ad Musa sub-division of the Habr Awal Isaaq clan, dominant Hargeisa as he constituent Somaliland representatives to Somalia.

== Career ==
Abdullahi became an early civil servant and held various positions Somali Democratic Republic during the 1970s and 1980s, most notably the governor of the southern Somali province of Merca between 1979 and 1990.

Following the collapse of the central government in 1991, during Abdullahi Yusuf Ahmed administration, Abdullahi served as Minister of Heritage and Culture between 2004 and 2007, as well as Minister of Health of the Transitional Federal Government of Somalia in 2008.

He has also held seats in the Federal Parliament of Somalia several times.

== Senate speaker ==
In January 2017, Abdullahi was elected as the first speaker of the Somali Senate since its formation 2016.

On 26 April 2022, Abdullahi was re-elected as Speaker of the Senate of Somalia for a second term.

On 3 December 2024, the announcement of the death of his predecessor Mohamed Ali Yusuf in Istanbul, Turkey, Abdullahi shared a statement expressing his legacy, calling him a "patriotic person with faith and humble spirit." Followed by a state funeral, Abdullahi prayed the Janasah at Mogadishu Airport on 6 December 2024.
