= Arlaadi Media Network =

- Company type: Private
- Founded: October 2021
- Founder: Ilyas Ali Hassan
- Headquarters: Mogadishu, Somalia
- Area served: Somalia and Diaspora

Arlaadi Media Network (AMN) is a Somalia-based independent media organization. Launched in 2021, AMN is the first network in Somalia to broadcast in Maay, one of the two recognized dialects of the Somali language. The network operates an FM radio station, a television channel, and a research arm known as the Arlaadi Institute for Policy Studies.

== Background ==
AMN was established in October 2021 and is headquartered in Mogadishu, Somalia. Founded by Ilyas Ali Hassan, AMN was created to provide a dedicated media and education platform for Somalia’s Maay-speaking population. AMN aimed enhancing inclusivity, linguistic diversity, and cultural preservation.

The network delivers content through television, FM radio, and digital platforms. Its programming spans news, politics, education, entertainment, and cultural content. Its official launch was attended by senior Somali officials, including former Prime Minister Hassan Ali Khaire.

== Press disputes ==
In July 2022, AMN outlets reported on a call to reconvene the regional assembly, it drew backlash from senior officials and calls for legal action. Press freedom group Somali Mechanism for Safety of Journalists (SMSJ) condemned the harassment, noting that the earlier threats had already forced two AMN reporters in Baidoa to stop working.

In September 2023, AMN faced renewed pressure after airing a report on alleged extortion in Wajid. Its director was interrogated by the Attorney General. The Somali Journalists Syndicate condemned the move as an attempt to silence the press.
