= Halima Ismail Ibrahim =

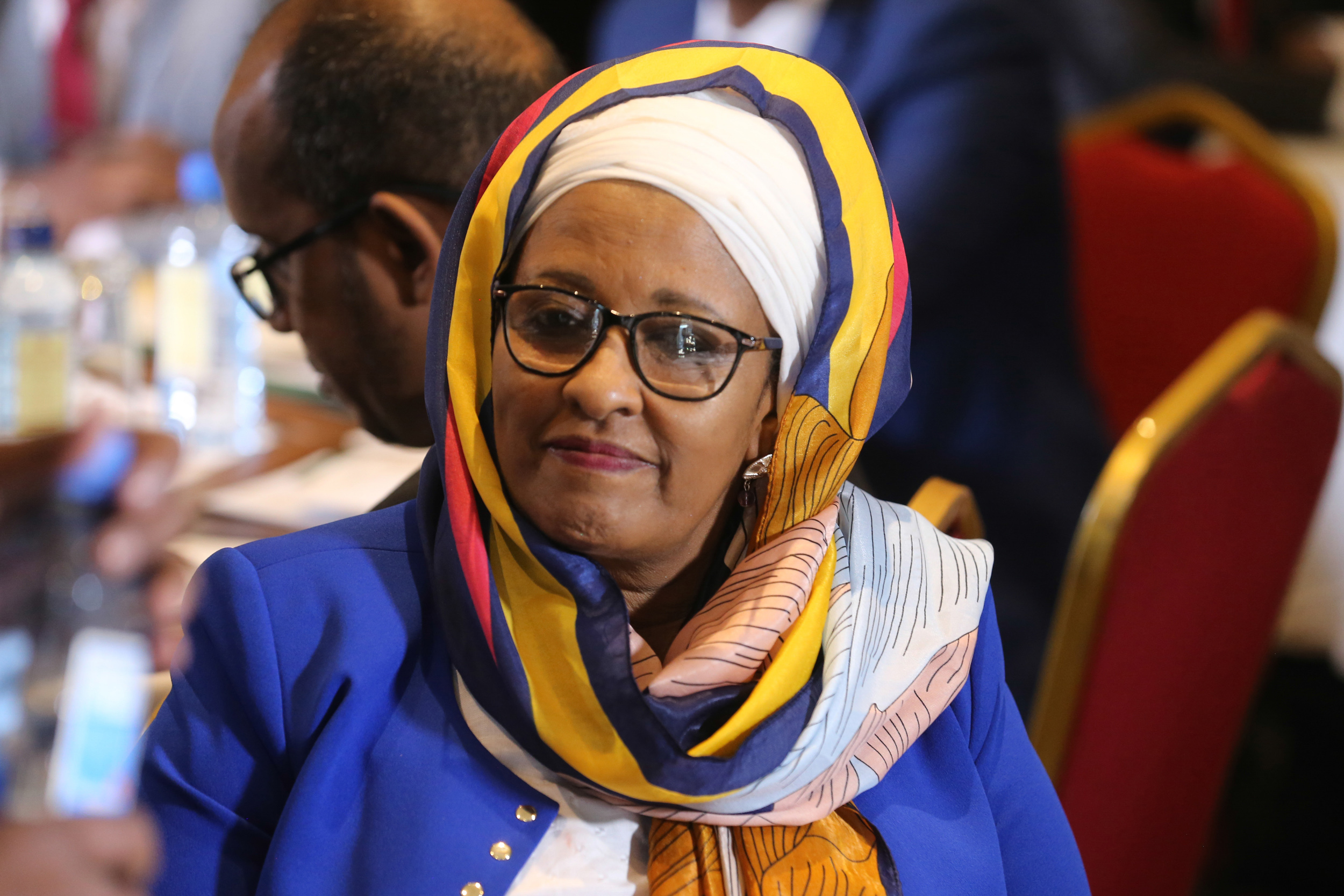
- in 2018
- Born: Mogadishu
- Known for: creating a fair election in Somalia

Halima Ismail Ibrahim (born ) is the Somali Chair of her country's independent electoral board. She is credited with introducing more democratic elections in Somalia in 2016/2017. 2020/2021 is the date chosen for a one-person one vote election based on the Somali people and not their clans.

== Life ==
Ibrahim was born in Mogadishu which is where she went to school and where she graduated in Agricultural Science. She went to Italy to gain a master's degree at the University of Turin. She was working with the UN up to 1996.

She returned to Somalia where she was elected as the chair of the National Independent Electoral Commission. Under her leadership the country introduced electoral registration which enable many people in the country to vote.

In 2016/2017 the Presidential and parliamentary elections took place with voting taking place in six cities. The target of 30% women members of parliament was missed but there was still 24% women.

Ibrahim was nominated for the 2016 Chatham House Prize.

In 2018 building work started to build a headquarters for the National Independent Electoral Commission.

The 2016/2017 election was an improvement on previous elections where many votes were bought but it was still by indirect suffrage. The last one person one vote election was in Somalia was in 1969 and the resulting government did not last the year. Under Ibrahim's guidance another one person one vote election will take place at a cost of $53 million in 2020/2021.
