= Mohamed Ali Nur =

Ambassador Mohamed Ali Nur

Somali Ambassador to Kenya
- In office October 2007 – April 2015
- Succeeded by: Gamal Osman

Personal details
- Born: 12 October 1962 (age 64) Mogadishu, Somalia
- Education: University of Maryland and Montgomery College, United States

Ambassador Mohamed Ali Nur, also known as "Ambassador Americo", is a Somali diplomat and public official who has served as Director General of the Mogadishu Port Authority since August 2025. He was Somalia's ambassador to Kenya from October 2007 to April 2015. He was also a candidate in the 2017 Somali presidential election.

He reopened Somalia's embassy in Nairobi, Kenya, after 17 years of closure during the Somali Civil War. In December 2010, the embassy recovered its building from a private individual following a ruling by Kenya's High Court. The property had been sold when the central government in Somalia collapsed.

In September 2014, Nur forgave a man who confessed to involvement in the killing of his 18-month-old daughter in 1992. He later travelled to different parts of Somalia to promote peace and reconciliation. In 2010, Nur and his family established the Yasmin Foundation in memory of his daughter. The non-profit organisation supports education, healthcare, water supply and environmental conservation initiatives in Somalia.

== Early life and education ==
Nur was born on 12 October 1962 in Mogadishu, Somalia, where he grew up. He is the eldest in a family of six siblings. His father, Ali Nur "Americo", worked as a foreman for a borehole-drilling company. He later ran restaurants and a car rental business in Mogadishu. He also invested in real estate. His mother was a housewife who died when he was nine years old.

Nur inherited the nickname "Americo" from his father, whose friends gave him the name because of his fondness for American cowboy hats. Nicknames are common in Somali culture.

Nur attended primary and secondary school in Mogadishu. He later studied economics at Montgomery College, Maryland, United States, before continuing his studies at the University of Maryland.

== Career and life ==
After graduating from the University of Maryland in 1985, Nur returned to Somalia. In 1986, he joined the Central Bank of Somalia (CBS) as head of the accounting department. He also helped manage his father's businesses in Mogadishu. Nur married and had his first child at the age of 26. He worked at the Central Bank until 1991, when the Somali Civil War began and the central government collapsed.

In 1992, armed men attacked Nur's home in Mogadishu. His 18-month-old daughter was killed when one of the attackers threw a grenade into the courtyard where she was playing. Following the incident, Nur and his family moved to the United States. They later relocated to Canada in 2000.

In 2004, Nur returned to Nairobi at the request of Ali Mohamed Gedhi, the newly appointed prime minister of Somalia's Transitional Federal Government (TFG). The TFG was initially based in the Kenyan capital. Nur was appointed Director General of the Prime Minister's Office.

In 2006, the TFG moved its operations from Kenya to Somalia, but Nur remained in Nairobi. He worked with a team to reopen Somalia's embassy in Nairobi, which started operations in 2006. Nur initially served as chargé d' affaires at the embassy. In October 2007, he was appointed Somalia's ambassador. He presented his diplomatic credentials to Kenyan President Mwai Kibaki at State House, Nairobi, on 19 October 2007. The ambassadorial position is important to Somalia because of Kenya's role in regional diplomacy, its large Somali refugee population and the presence of Somali-owned businesses.

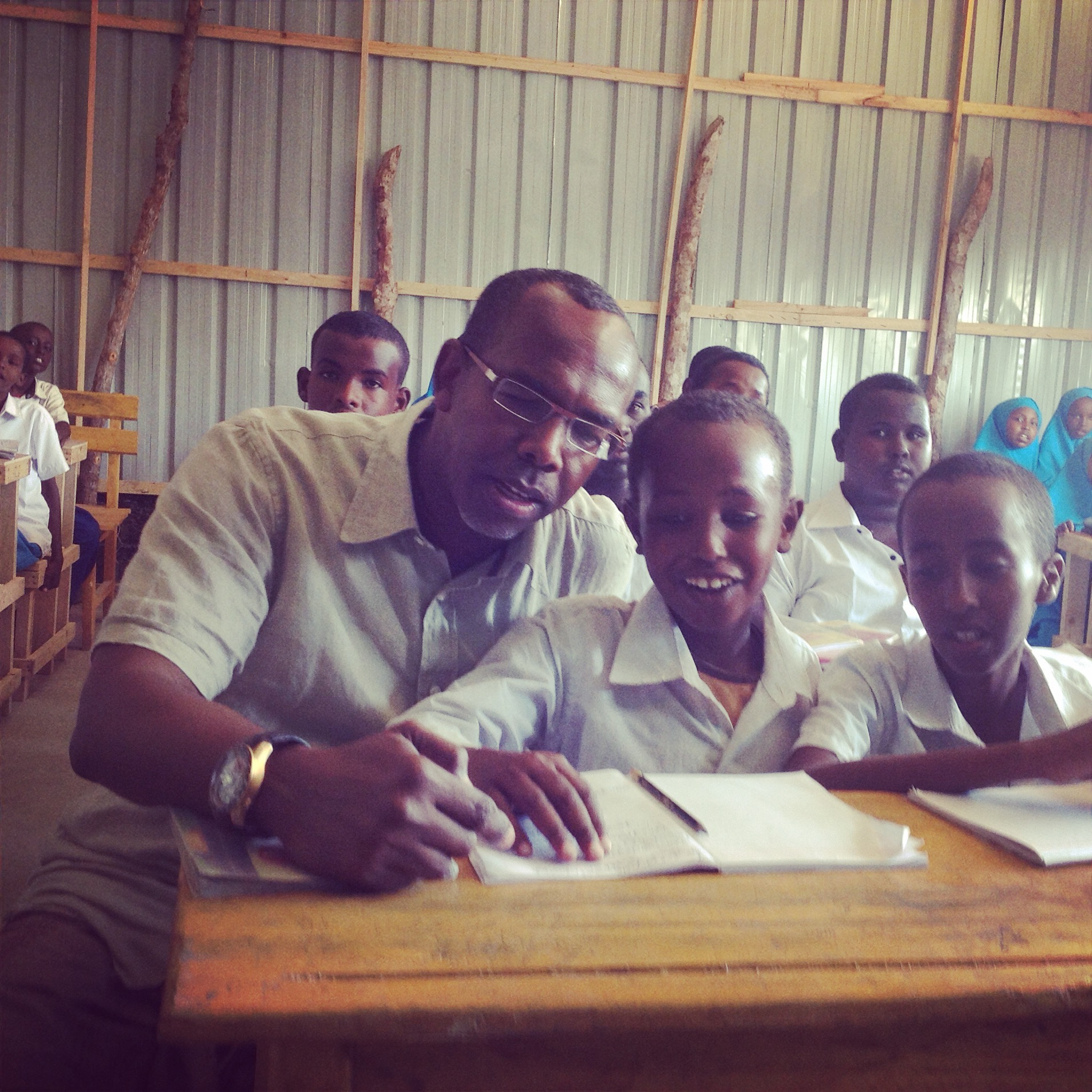
Mohamed Ali Nur with school children at Dadaab refugee complex

During his tenure, Nur led efforts to recover the Somali embassy building in Nairobi that had been sold to private individuals after the collapse of the Somali government. In December 2010, after three years of legal proceedings, Kenya's High Court ruled in favour of the Somali government.

Nur was also involved in discussions leading to the November 2013 agreement between Kenya, Somalia, and the United Nations High Commissioner for Refugees (UNHCR) on the voluntary return of Somali refugees from Kenya. During his tenure, Nur reported an increase in trade and commercial flights between Somalia and Kenya.

The Somali embassy in Nairobi resumed consular services and coordinated humanitarian assistance to Somalia with the United Nations and international NGOs. In 2013, it became the first Somali diplomatic mission to issue the new Somali passport. The embassy also helped Somali refugees obtain UNHCR documentation and authenticate educational certificates for Somali students wishing to study in Kenya.

Relations between Kenya and Somalia faced security challenges during Nur's time as ambassador. Kenyan troops entered Somalia in October 2011 to fight Al-Shabaab. The armed group carried out attacks in Kenya, including at Westgate Mall (September 2013), Mpeketoni (June 2014) and Garissa University College (April 2015). In response, Nur condemned the attacks and called for closer security cooperation between the two countries. He also spoke out against what he saw as the profiling, harassment and arrests of Somali nationals and ethnic Somalis in Kenya.

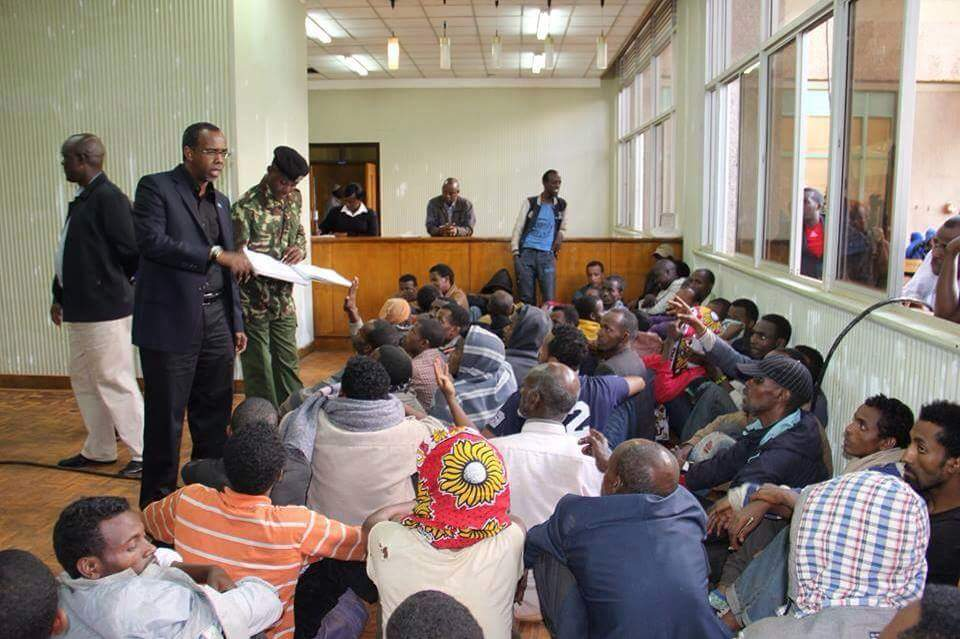
Ambassador Nur with Somali nationals in Kenyan custody after mass arrests in mid-2014 following twin bomb blasts in Nairobi

Whenever there are attacks, I see the media point fingers at Somalis. These Al Shabaab are not Somalis, they are criminals. Somali refugees are in Kenya because of these criminals. It is not, therefore, right to profile Somalis. Kenya and Somalia have a common enemy and must be united to fight them.

— Mohamed Ali Nur

After the Westgate Mall attack, Nur organised blood donations and fundraising efforts among Somali nationals in Kenya to support victims of the attacks.

Nur remained Somalia's envoy to Kenya until April 2015. Somali President Hassan Sheikh Mohamud appointed Gamal Osman to succeed him.

== Reconciliation ==
In September 2014, Nur forgave a man who confessed to being involved in the killing of his 18-month-old daughter in Mogadishu in 1992. The man approached Nur while he was sitting with friends at a Mogadishu restaurant. He admitted being part of the crime, expressed remorse and asked for forgiveness. Nur said that despite his shock, anger and desire for revenge, he forgave the man. The two embraced and cried. Nur later said forgiving the man made him feel as though "a huge weight had been lifted off his chest".

The incident received publicity in Somalia. Reports of similar cases, in which people confessed to past crimes and sought forgiveness from victims' families, subsequently emerged in other parts of the country. It also prompted public discussions about national reconciliation after the civil war.

Nur became involved in efforts to promote peace and reconciliation in Somalia. In 2015 and 2016, he travelled to different parts of the country as part of his "Peace Journey" (Somali: Socdaalka Nabadda).

== Presidential candidate ==
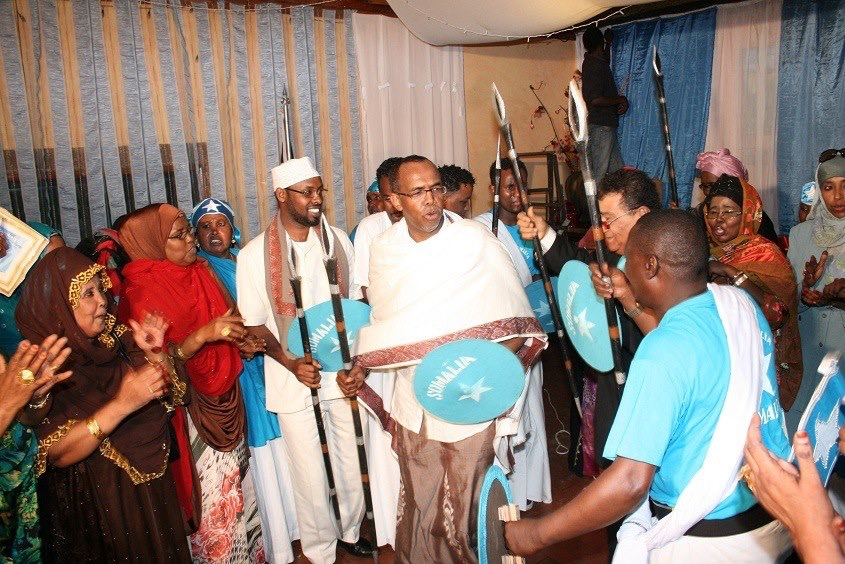
Ambassador Mohamed Ali Nur (centre) with the Somali diaspora community in Nairobi, during Somalia's Independence Day celebrations in 2014.

Nur was one of the 21 candidates who contested the Somalia 2017 presidential election. He took part in the first round of voting but did not secure enough votes to proceed to the next stage.

During his campaign, Nur pledged to rebuild the Somali National Army (SNA) to improve security and reduce the country's dependence on foreign troops. He also promised to create jobs and expand educational opportunities for young people, to reduce recruitment into Al Shabaab or prevent perilous migration journeys to other countries. In addition, he pledged to promote reconciliation through grassroot dialogues.

== Humanitarian work ==
In 2010, Nur and his family founded the Yasmin Foundation, a non-profit organization, to support education, healthcare, water supply and environmental conservation initiatives in Somalia. The foundation is named in memory of his daughter, Yasmin, who was killed during an attack on the family's home in Mogadishu in 1992.

Education

In August 2014, the foundation established Yasmin Primary and Secondary School in Balcad district, in Somalia's Middle Shabelle region. The school provides free education to children, including orphans and those from low-income families. In August 2026, the foundation announced it had completed renovating and expanding the school.

The foundation has also supported schools for children with disabilities and orphans in Mogadishu, including Madina Educational Centre, now known as Rajo School, Hodan School, Al Basiir School, and Yasmin School for the Deaf and Orphan Children. It also supports Yasmin Orphan School in Afgooye, Lower Shabelle region.

Healthcare

Ambassador Mohamed Ali Nur distributing books to learners in a school supported by Yasmin Foundation in Somalia.

The foundation reports constructing a clinic at Yasmin School in Ceel Cirfiid, Middle Shabelle, to provide medical services to residents, particularly children and pregnant women.

Water Supply

The foundation reports drilling a borehole in Ceel Cirfiid, and contributing to the construction of another in Shabeley, near Warsheikh, Middle Shabelle, to improve water access for local communities and livestock. The Shabeley borehole was inaugurated in October 2020.

Environmental Conservation

The foundation promotes tree planting in Somalia, where charcoal and wood fuel use contribute to tree loss. It also raises awareness about plastic pollution and sustainable agricultural practices.

== Mogadishu Port Authority ==
In August 2025, the Federal Government of Somalia appointed Nur Director General of the Mogadishu Port Authority, replacing Ahmed Mohamed Mohamud.

In late August 2025, a new container terminal opened at Mogadishu Port, increasing its reported annual container-handling capacity from 150,000 to 250,000 twenty-foot equivalent units (TEUs).

Ambassador Mohamed Ali Nur (third from right) inspecting Mogadishu Port.

In September 2025, the World Bank and S&P Global released the 2024 Container Port Performance Index (CPPI), which ranked Mogadishu Port 163^{rd} globally and first among the East African ports assessed. The index measures how long container ships spend in port, including waiting and loading and unloading time. In the 2025 CPPI, released in 2026, the port rose 36 places to rank 127^{th} worldwide.

In November 2025, the port introduced 24-hour operations to reduce congestion, shorten delays and improve services for shipping companies and traders.

In February 2026, Nur participated in the signing ceremony of a maritime cooperation agreement between Somalia and Saudi Arabia in Riyadh. The agreement aimed to improve maritime transport, port operations and the exchange of technical expertise. Nur is also overseeing the construction of a new administration headquarters for Mogadishu Port Authority.
