= Abdi Ahmed Dhuhulow =

Somali politician

Abdi Ahmed Dhuhulow is a politician from Somalia, currently serving as a senator. He sits as part of the opposition.

== See also ==
- List of members of the Federal Parliament of Somalia
