= Elections in Somalia =

During the civilian administration that existed prior to the seizure of power by the Supreme Revolutionary Council (SRC) in 1969, there were a number of local political parties. Most notable of these early institutions was the Somali Youth League, the nation's first political organization. Upon assuming office, the Siad Barre-led SRC outlawed all extant political parties and advocated a form of scientific socialism inspired by Maoist China and the Soviet Union.

Following the outbreak of the civil war in 1991 that saw the ouster of the Barre regime, many of the few remaining political parties gave way to autonomous or semi-autonomous regional states in the northern part of the country, or fragmented into feuding militia groups in the south.

After several unsuccessful national reconciliation efforts, a Transitional Federal Government (TFG) was formed in 2004 with a mandate leading toward the establishment of a new constitution and a transition to a representative government. In 2012 the Federal Government of Somalia was established and is currently the internationally recognised government of Somalia.

== Post-transition ==
In June 2011, the mandates of President Sharif Sheikh Ahmed, the Parliament Speaker Sharif Adan Sharif Hassan and Deputies were extended until August 2012, after which point new elections were to be organized.

As part of the official "Roadmap for the End of Transition", Somali government officials met in the northeastern town of Garowe in February 2012 to discuss post-transition arrangements. After extensive deliberations attended by regional actors and international observers, the conference ended in a signed agreement between President Sharif Sheikh Ahmed, Prime Minister Abdiweli Mohamed Ali, Speaker of Parliament Sharif Adan Sharif Hassan, Puntland President Abdirahman Mohamed Farole, Galmudug President Mohamed Ahmed Alim and Ahlu Sunnah Waljama'a representative Khalif Abdulkadir Noor stipulating that:

a) a new 225 member bicameral parliament would be formed, consisting of an upper house seating 54 Senators as well as a lower house;
b) 30% of the National Constituent Assembly (NCA) is earmarked for women;
c) the President is to be appointed via a constitutional election; and
d) the Prime Minister is selected by the President and he/she then names his/her Cabinet.

== 2016–2017 Elections ==
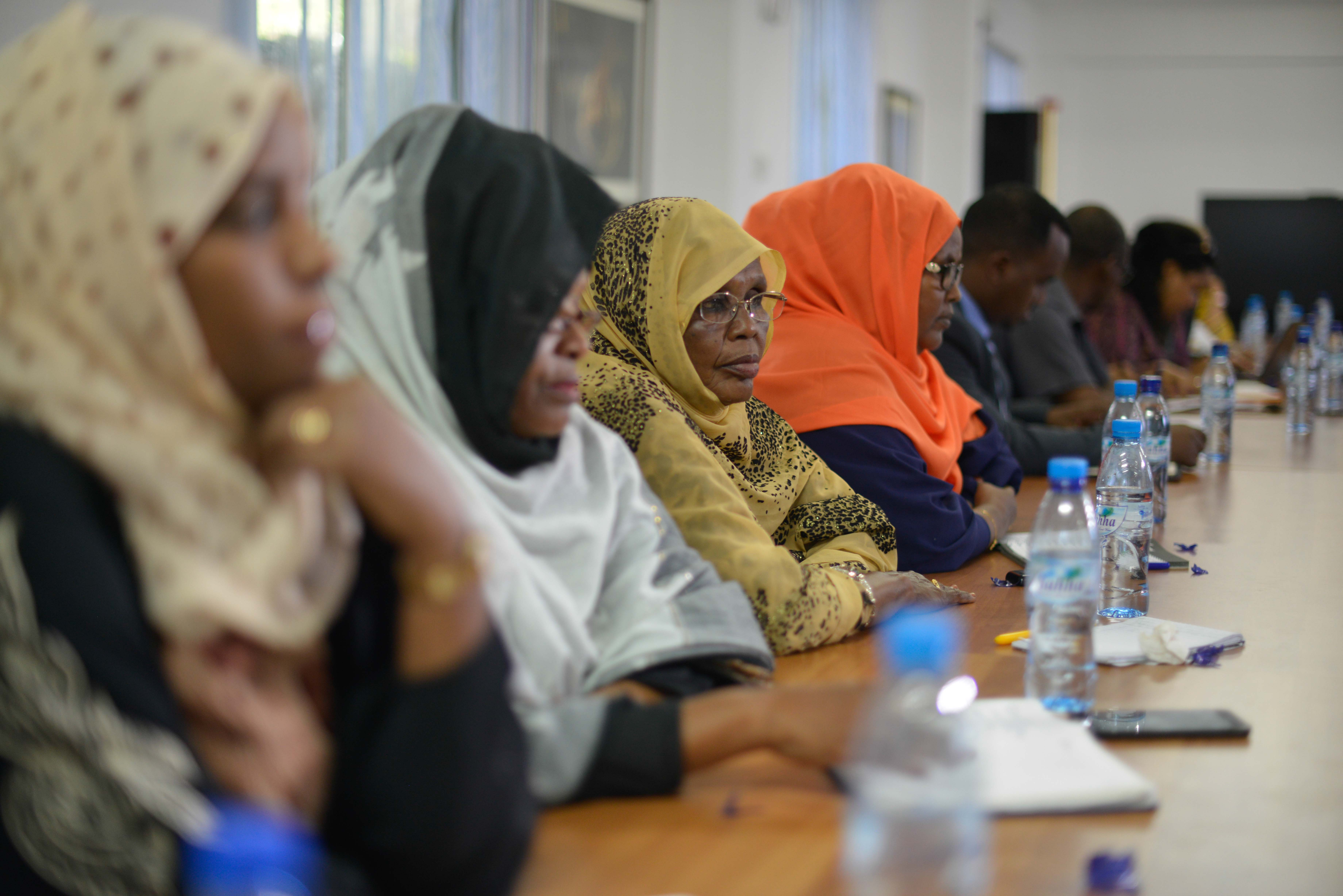
Somali women leaders, members of civil society and senior officials from the African Union Mission in Somalia (AMISOM) and the United Nations in a meeting in Mogadishu on August 11, 2016. which they agreed to support the outcome of the Somali National Leadership Forum that will make sure women will get 30% representation, across all levels of leadership in the forthcoming elections.

The 2016–2017 election was by indirect suffrage. The last one-person-one-vote election in Somalia was in 1969 and the resulting government did not last the year. Under Halima Ismail Ibrahim and the National Independent Electoral Commission another one person one vote election was supposed to take place at a cost of $53 million in 2020/2021.

== 2021–2022 Elections ==
Popular elections were to be held in Somalia in 2020 for the first time since 1969, but a constituency election model will be implemented instead where clan elders and members of civil society indirectly elect the members of the Somali parliament. UNSOM has been mandated to support the preparation for the elections. The 2021 elections in Somalia were both scheduled to take place in February but were delayed.

Elections for the Senate, the upper house of Somalia's bi-cameral legislature, were held between 29 July and 13 November 2021. The resulting membership of the Senate fell short of the 30% threshold for women, with only 24% (13 out of 54) of seats in the Senate held by women.

Elections for the House of the People, the lower house of Somalia's legislature, began on 1 November and expected to conclude on 24 December 2021. The elections were initially extended to 25 February, then to 15 March, and were scheduled to be completed by 31 March 2022. As of 31 March, 26 out of 275 seats remained unfilled.

President Hassan Sheikh Mohamud was elected as President of the country by the Federal Parliament on 15 May 2022.

== 2027 elections ==
In November 2026, the authorities announced that parliamentary elections are scheduled for 15 April 2027, and presidential elections for 15 May 2027.

== See also ==
- Electoral calendar
- Electoral system
