= People's Assembly Building (Somalia) =

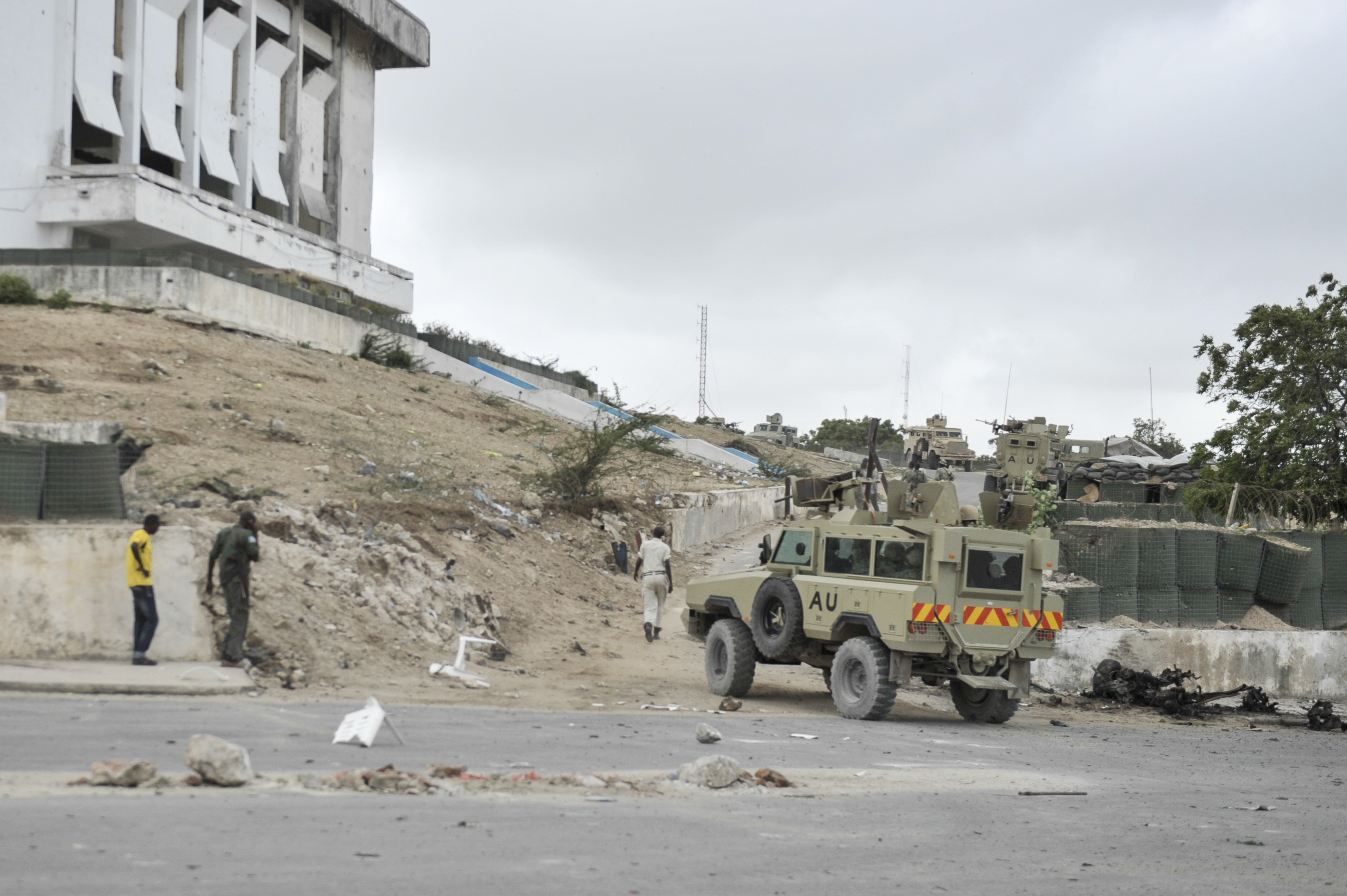
- People's Assembly Building, upper left
- Interactive map of the People's Assembly Building area

General information
- Status: Ruin; partially restored (2012); planned for complete reconstruction
- Type: Former parliament building
- Architectural style: Modernism / Brutalism
- Location: Mogadishu, Somalia
- Coordinates: 2°2′41″N 45°20′19″E
- Completed: 1972
- Demolished: Severely damaged during the Somali Civil War (early 1990s)
- Owner: Government of Somalia

The People's Assembly Building (Dhismaha Golaha Shacabka) was the second historic seat of the Parliament of Somalia in Mogadishu, Somalia. Completed in 1972 during the rule of Siad Barre, the modernist building was a prominent symbol of the centralized Somali state. It was severely damaged during the Somali Civil War and largely remains a ruin, although it was partially restored for government use in 2012 and is the site of a planned complete reconstruction.

== History ==
The construction of the People's Assembly Building in 1972 was a conscious act of nation-building by the government of Siad Barre, who came to power in the 1969 coup d'état. The building represented the regime's aspirations for a strong, centralized, and modern Somali state, marking a decisive break from the colonial-era parliament building that had served as the first seat of the legislature.

=== Destruction in the Civil War ===
After the fall of Siad Barre's regime and the outbreak of the Somali Civil War in 1991, the building became a symbol of the state's collapse. Located in a strategic area, it was heavily fought over and sustained catastrophic damage from shelling and gunfire. Its physical destruction became a metaphor for the deconstruction of the Somali state itself, and images of its ruined, bullet-riddled structure became iconic representations of the conflict.

=== Partial Restoration and Planned Reconstruction ===
A partial restoration of the building took place in 2012, coinciding with the end of the Transitional Federal Government and the establishment of the new Federal Government of Somalia. This was a symbolic act of reclaiming a key state institution, making the building partially usable for government purposes.

In March 2018, a significant new chapter was announced with an agreement between the Somali parliament and the Turkish Cooperation and Coordination Agency (TIKA) to completely rebuild the damaged building. The project envisages the construction of a new, modern, seven-story structure on the same site, which will house offices for members of both houses of parliament.

== Architecture ==
The People's Assembly Building is a significant example of Modernist/Brutalist architecture. Its design was heavily influenced by the work of the Swiss-French architect Le Corbusier, particularly his projects in Chandigarh, India. This choice of style was a political and cultural statement, symbolizing a radical break from the colonial architectural language of the past and aligning the new Somali Republic with the global post-colonial movement that used modern architecture to project ideals of progress, rationality, and secular statehood.

Key features of the design include a wide entrance canopy, a structure composed of three distinct volumes, and the use of quiet courtyards.

== Significance and current status ==
The ruin is one of Mogadishu's most recognizable landmarks. It symbolizes the country's rule under Siad Barre, its subsequent collapse into civil war, and the ongoing efforts toward reconstruction.

The current Federal Parliament of Somalia, established in 2012, meets in a separate, heavily fortified building, the House of the People, located within the Villa Somalia presidential compound, as the old site is not yet fully restored or secure.

== See also ==
- House of the People (Somalia)
- Casa del Fascio (Mogadishu)
- Federal Parliament of Somalia
- History of Mogadishu
