= Ilyas Ali Hassan =

Somali diplomat

Ambassador Ilyas Ali Hassan

Ambassador of Somalia to Tanzania and EAC
- In office May 2024 – Present
- President: Hassan Sheikh Mohamud
- Preceded by: Sahra Ali Hassan

Somalia State Minister of Interior
- In office 2022–2023

Senator and Chair of the Senate Committee on Natural Resources, Federal Parliament of Somalia
- In office 2016–2021

Personal details
- Born: Ilyas Ali Hassan Burhakaba, Somalia
- Party: Himilo Qaran Party
- Education: Mogadishu University; Friedrich-Alexander University
- Occupation: Politician

Ilyas Ali Hassan (Somali: Ilyaas Cali Xasan), is a Somali diplomat, politician, and media entrepreneur. He serves as the Ambassador of Somalia to Tanzania, and as the Permanent Representative of Somalia to the East African Community since May 2024. Hassan is also accredited as non-resident Ambassador to Rwanda, the DRC, Malawi, Mauritius, and Comoros. Prior to this role, Hassan served as Somalia State Minister of Interior since 2022, and previously he had served as a senator in 10th Federal Parliament of Somalia,and chaired the Senate Committee on Natural Resources. Hassan also held role as the Foreign Affairs Secretary of the Himilo Qaran Party.

== Early life and education ==
Hassan was born in Buurhakaba, Somalia, He belongs to the Eelaay sub-clan of the Digil and Mirifle (Rahanweyn) clan family. Hassan earned a bachelor's degree in public administration from Mogadishu University and later in 2017 he obtained a Master of Arts in Human Rights from Friedrich-Alexander University, Germany.

== Career ==
=== Diplomatic career ===
In May 2024, Hassan was appointed as the Ambassador Extraordinary and Plenipotentiary of the Federal Republic of Somalia to the United Republic of Tanzania, and as the Permanent Representative of Somalia to the East African Community. He is also accredited as non-resident Ambassador to Rwanda, the DRC, Malawi, Mauritius, and Comoros. He presented his credentials to President Samia Suluhu Hassan of Tanzania on November 26, 2024, and to Rwandan President Paul Kagame on May 21, 2025.

In 2022, following the completion of his senatorial term, Hassan was appointed as State Minister of Interior, Federal Affairs, and Reconciliation in the Federal Government of Somalia. He served in this position until 2023.

Between 2018 and 2024, Hassan served as the Foreign Affairs Secretary of the Himilo Qaran Party.

In 2016, Hassan was elected as a Senator in the Upper House of the Federal Parliament of Somalia, representing Southwest State. During his term, he chaired the Senate Committee on Natural Resources until 2021.

== Media ==
Hassan is the founder of Arlaadi Media Network, a Maay-speaking outlet established in 2021 to amplify the voices of Somalia’s Maay-speaking community. It promotes linguistic rights and broadcasts educational, political, and cultural content.
