= Abdullahi Mohamed Nur =

Somali politician

Abdulaahi Mohamed Nuur is a Somali politician who is a Member of the House of the People, the lower house of the Federal Parliament of Somalia, representing Hirshabelle. He is the minister of internal security for the federal republic of Somalia and former State Minister for Finance.
