= Casa del Fascio (Mogadishu) =

Casa del Fascio, Mogadishu
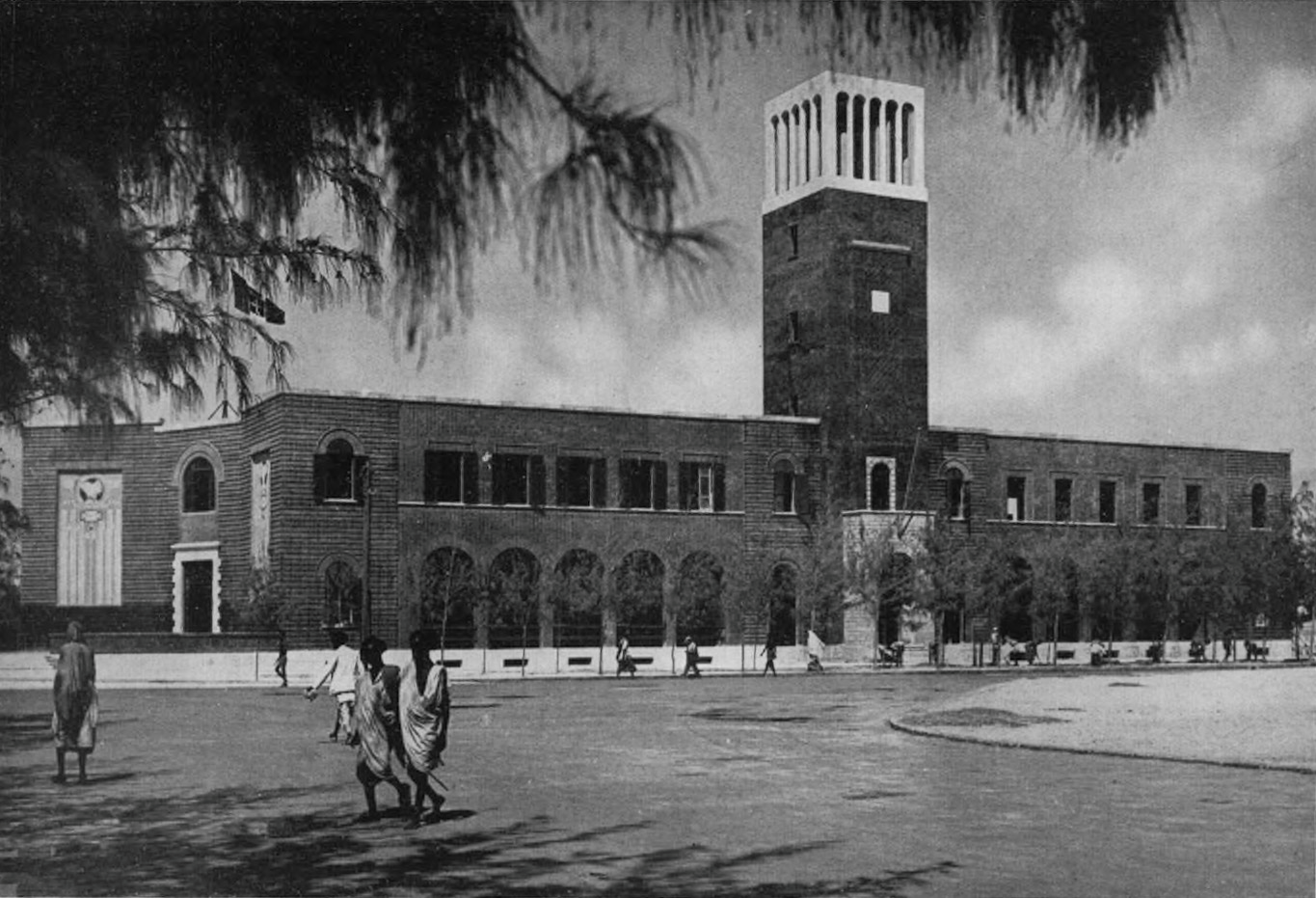
- Casa del Fascio in 1930s
- Interactive map of the Casa del Fascio, Mogadishu area

General information
- Status: Ruin
- Type: Former political headquarters, former parliament building
- Architectural style: Italian Rationalism, Fascist
- Location: Mogadishu, Somalia
- Coordinates: 2°02′19″N 45°20′30″E
- Construction started: c. 1937
- Completed: c. 1939
- Demolished: Destroyed during the Somali Civil War (early 1990s)

The Casa del Fascio of Mogadishu (also known as Casa Littoria) was the local headquarters, a Casa del Fascio, of the National Fascist Party in the capital of Italian Somaliland. After World War II, the building was repurposed to become the first seat of the Parliament of Somalia, serving as the nation's legislative building in the early years of independence.

It was replaced by the modernist People's Assembly Building in 1972. Like many historical landmarks in the city, it was severely damaged during the Somali Civil War and remains a ruin.

== History ==
=== Fascist Party Headquarters ===
The Casa del Fascio was constructed between 1937 and 1939 as a key symbolic centerpiece of Italian colonial urbanism in Mogadishu. Designed by Baciocchi and Valenti, it was intended to project the power and cultural dominance of the Fascist regime. Its most imposing feature was a 30-meter-high central tower, the Torre Littoria (Lictor's Tower), which symbolized fascist vigilance over the city and the sea. The interior contained sixty-six rooms and a large arched gallery, a Sacrario, a shrine to fallen fascists.

=== First Parliament of Somalia ===
Following the end of World War II and the dissolution of the Fascist regime, the building's function changed dramatically. After Somalia gained full independence in 1960, the building was repurposed to house the official sessions of the unicameral National Assembly of the newly formed Somali Republic. This transformation represented a powerful post-colonial act, where a symbol of foreign domination became the seat of a sovereign and independent Somali legislature.

=== Destruction ===
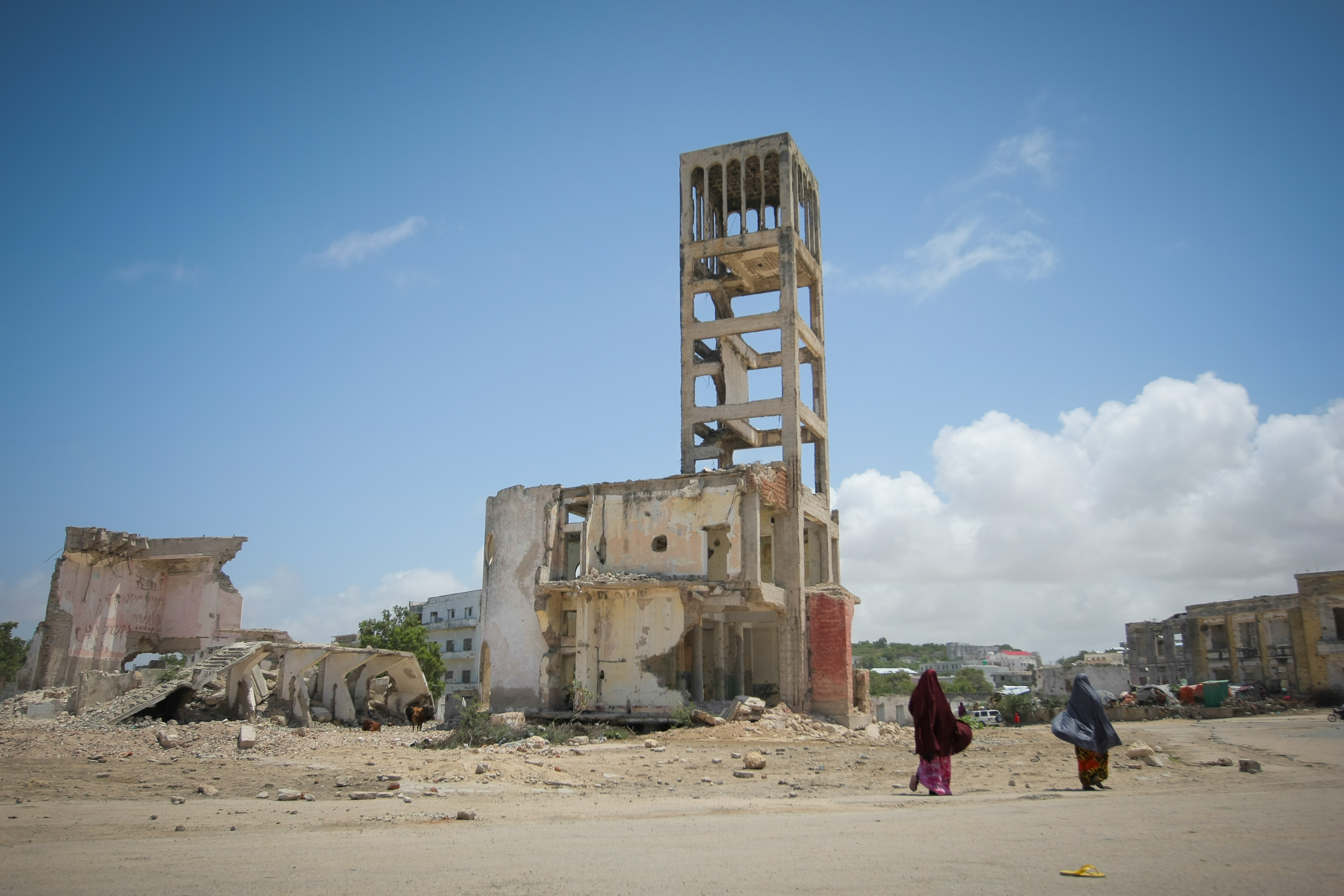
The ruins of the former Casa del Fascio, which served as Somalia's first parliament building

The building's was destroyed during the Somali Civil War, which began in 1991. It was severely damaged in the fighting and fell into ruin. Today, only the central tower and some surrounding walls remain, standing as a monument to the Italian colonial period and the early years of Somali independence.

== Architecture ==
The Casa del Fascio was designed according to the principles of Italian Rationalism with monumental elements. The facade was constructed entirely of red bricks produced in local kilns. Key architectural features included:

- A large, triangular floor plan with clipped corners.
- A symmetrical design, with a central axis of symmetry running through the tower.
- Mirrored façades with grand entrances at the corners, accentuated by stairwells.
- Doorways bordered by bossage and crowned with a stone cornice.
- Rectangular windows with semi-circular pediments above the main doors.

== See also ==
- People's Assembly Building (Somalia)
- House of the People (Somalia)
- Italian Somaliland
- Fascist architecture
