= House of the People (Somalia) =

- Golaha Shacabka
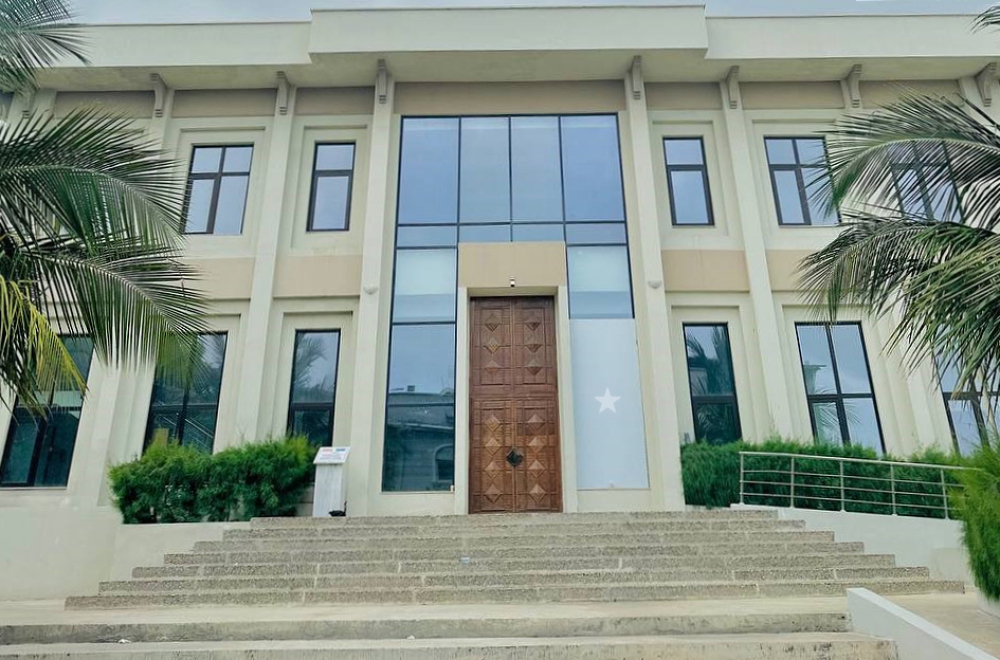
- House of the People (2026)
- Interactive map of the House of the People area

General information
- Status: In use
- Type: Parliament building
- Architectural style: Modern
- Location: Villa Somalia complex, Mogadishu, Somalia
- Coordinates: 2°2′40″N 45°19′58″E
- Current tenants: Federal Parliament of Somalia
- Completed: c. 2012; 14 years ago
- Owner: Federal Government of Somalia

The House of the People (Golaha Shacabka) is the building that serves as the current seat of the Federal Parliament of Somalia. It is the third building in the nation's history to house its legislature, following the Casa del Fascio and the People's Assembly Building. Located in Mogadishu, within the heavily fortified Villa Somalia presidential compound, its construction and use symbolize the state-building efforts of the 21st century.

The building primarily houses the lower house of the parliament, which is also officially named the House of the People, but it is used for joint sessions of both the lower and upper house of the bicameral legislature.

== History and Construction ==
After the collapse of the central government in 1991 and the subsequent destruction of the People's Assembly Building, Somalia was without a formal legislative seat for over two decades. Following the end of the country's transitional period, the new Federal Parliament of Somalia was established in 2012. Due to the precarious security situation, a new, secure building was constructed for the parliament in the early 2010s within the presidential "Green Zone".

Its inauguration marked a significant step in Somalia's political transition, providing a permanent home for the legislature after years of meeting in temporary locations, such as police academies or the airport. Unlike the historic parliament buildings, the new House of the People was designed with modern security needs as a top priority.

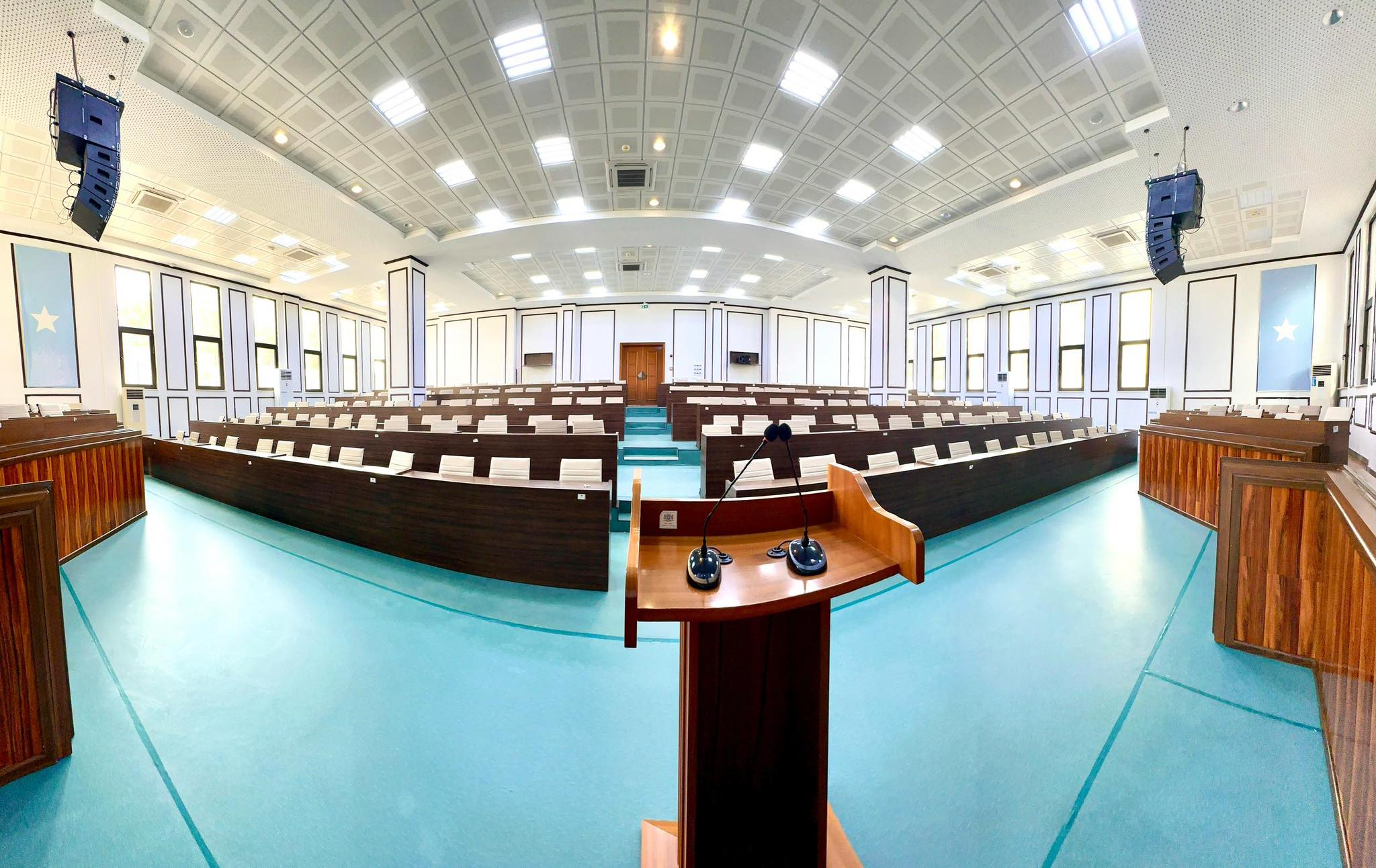
Interior view of the House of the People. (view as a 360° interactive panorama)

== Location and Security ==
The House of the People is strategically located within the Villa Somalia compound, which also houses the offices of the President and Prime Minister of Somalia. This location provides maximum security for the nation's legislative functions in a city that has faced significant security challenges.

Despite its fortified location, the parliament has been a target for insurgents. In May 2014, militants from Al-Shabaab launched a complex attack on the parliament building, resulting in a gun battle with security forces that left several people dead. The attack highlighted the significant security risks faced by the Somali government.

== Function ==
The building is the primary venue for all activities of the Federal Parliament of Somalia, which is a bicameral legislature consisting of:

- The House of the People (the lower house)
- The Upper House (the senate)

It is where laws are debated and passed, presidential elections are held, and other key national political events take place.

== See also ==
- Federal Parliament of Somalia (the institution)
- People's Assembly Building (Somalia) (the second parliament building, now a ruin)
- Casa del Fascio (Mogadishu) (the first parliament building, now a ruin)
- Villa Somalia
- Politics of Somalia
