= Senate of Somalia =

Upper chamber of the Federal Parliament of Somalia

The Senate of Somalia Aqalka Sare
- 10th Parliament

Type
- Type: The Upper House of the Federal Parliament of Somalia

Leadership
- Speaker: Sen. Abdi Hashi Abdullahi since April 26, 2022
- 1st Deputy Speaker: Sen. Ali Sha'ban Ibrahim since April 26, 2022
- 2nd Deputy Speaker: Sen. Abdullahi Ali Hersi "Tima Adde" since April 26, 2022
- Chief Whip: Sen. Zamzam Ibrahim Ali since April 26, 2022
- Deputy Chief Whip: Sen. Iftin Hasan Basto since April 26, 2022

Structure
- Seats: 54 Senators
- Political groups: Senate composition (54): Galmudug; Hirshabelle; Jubaland; Puntland; Somaliland; South West
- Length of term: 4 Years

Meeting place
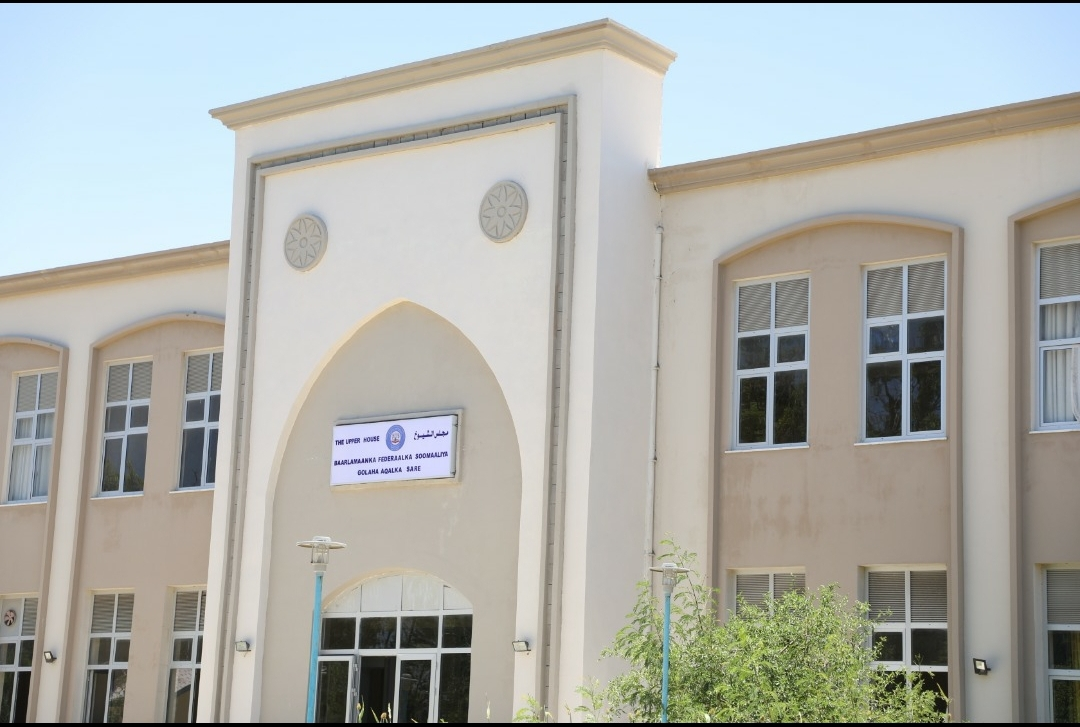

Website
- senate.gov.so

Constitution
- Constitution of the Federal Republic of Somalia

The Senate of Somalia is the upper chamber of the bicameral legislature of Somalia, which, along with the lower chamber constitutes the legislature of Somalia. The Senate chamber is located in Mogadishu, the capital City of Somalia.

The term "Senator" usually refers to a member of the Aqalka Sare, the Upper House of Somalia Federal parliament and the term "Xildhibaan" is used for the member of the House of People (the lower house), this does not imply the former is more powerful than the latter. The approval of both houses is necessary for legislation to become law and, thus, the Senate can reject bills passed by the House of the People.

== History ==
The Senate came into existence in 2016 when Somalia shifted to a bicameral legislature and formed its 10th Parliament. This was after Art.61 (3) and Art.71 were mandated that brought the Upper House into existence, thus discharging the responsibilities of the 9th parliament.

The Senate consists of 54 senators from the different Federal Member States of the country. The Senate is composed of senators, each of whom represents a single state in its entirety.

The electorate expanded from 135 male elders in 2012, to more than 14,000 including 30 percent of women. The Senate of Somalia represents the Federal Member States and is responsible for the facilitating Federalism Principles, Initiating and amending laws, scrutinising the bills and carrying out oversight functions.

== Composition ==
The Senate of Somalia has 54 Senators from different Somali Federal Member States, Puntland, Jubbaland, Galmudug, Southwest, Hirshabelle and the administrative region of Somaliland.

Federal Member State	Amount of Senators	Percentage
Somaliland	11	20%
Puntland	11	20%
Jubaland	8	15%
Galmudug	8	15%
South West	8	15%
Hirshabelle	8	15%
Total members	54	100%

=== Qualification ===
The constitution sets three qualifications for senators:

- Must be a citizen of the Federal Republic of Somalia of sound mind and not younger than 25 years of age
- Not have their citizenship suspended by a court order in the last five years
- Have a minimum of secondary education certificate or equivalent experience

=== Representation ===
There are 5 de facto Federal Member States: Galmudug, Hirshabelle, Jubaland, South-West, Puntland, and Banaadir. Each Federal Member State is entitled to a specific number of Senate seats. In comparison to most other upper houses worldwide, the Somali formula does not use representation by population as a primary criterion for member selection. Regional assemblies elect the Senators except for Northern Regions, whose delegates elect their Senators in Mogadishu. Senators serve terms of four years each as per the Constitution. The Upper House of Federal Parliament cannot be dissolved.

=== Elections and Term ===
The Provisional Constitution of Somalia refers that the term Federal Parliament both houses is four years beginning from the elections. In addition, the members of the Upper House of Somalia Federal Parliament cannot be dissolved.

== Committees ==
The Senate also has several committees that carry out the house business and also involve in legislative processes. Other committees may be established on an ad hoc basis for specific purposes and they can monitor executive branches of the government to review their performances and make sure that law is upheld.

Standing Committees of The Upper House of Somalia Federal Parliament

No.	Committee Name
1	Rules of Procedure, Ethics and immunity of the Senators Committee
2	Oversight Committee On the Review and Implementation of the Provisional Constitution
3	Judiciary Affairs and Human Rights Committee
4	Interior, Federalism, Reconciliation and Federal State Relations Committee
5	Security and Defense Committee
6	Foreign Affairs, Planning and Investment Committee
7	Social Service Development, Humanitarian Affairs, Information and Culture Committee
8	National Resources, Infrastructure & Transportation Committee
9	Economy, Finance, Trade, Industry, Communications and Tourism Committee

== Legislative functions ==
Although legislation may be introduced in either chamber, most bills originate in the House of People. The Senate is not permitted to originate bills imposing taxes or appropriating public funds. The Senate tends to be less partisan and confrontational than the House of the people and is more likely to come to a consensus on issues. It is more active at reviewing, amending, and even rejecting Federalism Principles, Initiate and amend laws, scrutinise the bills and carry out oversight functions.

The Upper House of the Federal Parliament legislative duties includes Participation in the process of the amending the Constitution; Passing, or rejecting the laws that are tabled; Study of laws; Participation in the election of the President of the Federal Republic; Dismissal of the President; Participation in the process of declaring war; Carrying out other duties required by the Constitution to ensure proper implementation and review of the Constitution and Participation in the process of declaring a state of emergency. It also approves the appointment of Members of the Judicial Service Commission; Chairman and Judges of the Constitutional Court; Members of the National Independent Electoral Commission; Members of the Boundaries and Federation Commission and Members of the Arbitration Committee.

== Procedure ==
=== Daily sessions and debates ===
The Senate uses Standing Rules for operation. Like the House of Representatives, the Senate meets in Mogadishu. At one end of the chamber of the Senate is a dais from which the presiding officer presides. The lower tier of the dais is used by clerks and other officials. Every senator has a right to speak in the house debates, but he/she must register first and be given the floor by the chair. Senators during debate can speak only about the issues that are in question and are not allowed to speak about the same issue after that. According to Art. 31, Para. 4 of the Rules of Procedure states, the maximum duration of speaking for any Senator is ten minutes and only exception for longer duration is when the chair allows them to speak on it. Both the Prime Minister and President are exempt from any time limit. During a debate, senators may only speak if called upon by the presiding officer, but the presiding officer is required to recognize the first senator who rises to speak. All speakers, except for the house leadership or high-level guests, must stand in front of the Senators and address them directly. As given in Art. 32 of the Rules of Procedure, no speaker should be interrupted in between with only a few exceptions when Rules of Procedure are broken; speaker talks about items not included in the agenda; speaker gives inaccurate information; and there is a motion for the continuation of the debate or voting.

=== Debate ===
Apart from rules governing civility, there are few restrictions on the content of speeches; there is no requirement that speeches pertain to the matter before the Senate. While debating on the bills should commence with a background and discussion of the bill and only the sponsor institution can ask general questions from the Senators on it. An article-by-article debate shall be convened after the relevant house committee submits its deliberations on the bill in the second reading session.

=== Voting ===
When the debate concludes, the motion in question is put to a vote. The presiding officer puts the question, and Members respond either yes or no. The vote is closed at the discretion of the presiding officer. The Upper House’ members may vote only on items included in the agenda by raising their hands, and a decision is based on the majority's vote (50%+1) of those present at the session. The general secretariat counts up the votes, and the chair of the session declares the result.

== Members ==
The number of members in the Senate currently stands at 54, led by the House Speaker.

Speaker of the Senate	Period	Notes
Abdi Hashi Abdullahi	22 January 2017 -	

Member of the senate	Period 2016–2021	Notes
Abdirizak Jurile	12 December 2016	
