= Federal Parliament of Somalia =

National legislature of Somalia

Federal Parliament of Somalia Baarlamaanka Federaalka Soomaaliya
- 11th Somali Parliament
- Emblem of the Federal Parliament

Type
- Type: Bicameral
- Houses: Senate; House of the People

History
- Founded: 20 August 1956
- Preceded by: Transitional Federal Parliament of Somalia

Leadership
- Speaker of the Senate: Abdi Hashi Abdullahi since 22 January 2017
- Speaker of the House: Abdulkadir Mohamed Nur since 10 August 2026

Structure
- Seats: 329; 54 Senators; 275 Members of Parliament (MPs)
- Upper House political groups: Composition (54): Galmudug (8); Hirshabelle (8); Jubaland (8); Puntland (11); Somaliland (11); South West (8)
- Lower House political groups: Composition (275): Hawiye (61); Dir (61); Rahanweyn (61); Darod (61); Other (Note: Other refers to 0.5 out of the 4.5 total power sharing, comprising minority clans and other ethnic groups who represent roughly 15% of the total population in Somalia.) (31)

Elections
- Lower House voting system: Indirect first-past-the-post
- Last Lower House election: 2021–2022
- Next Lower House election: TBD

Meeting place
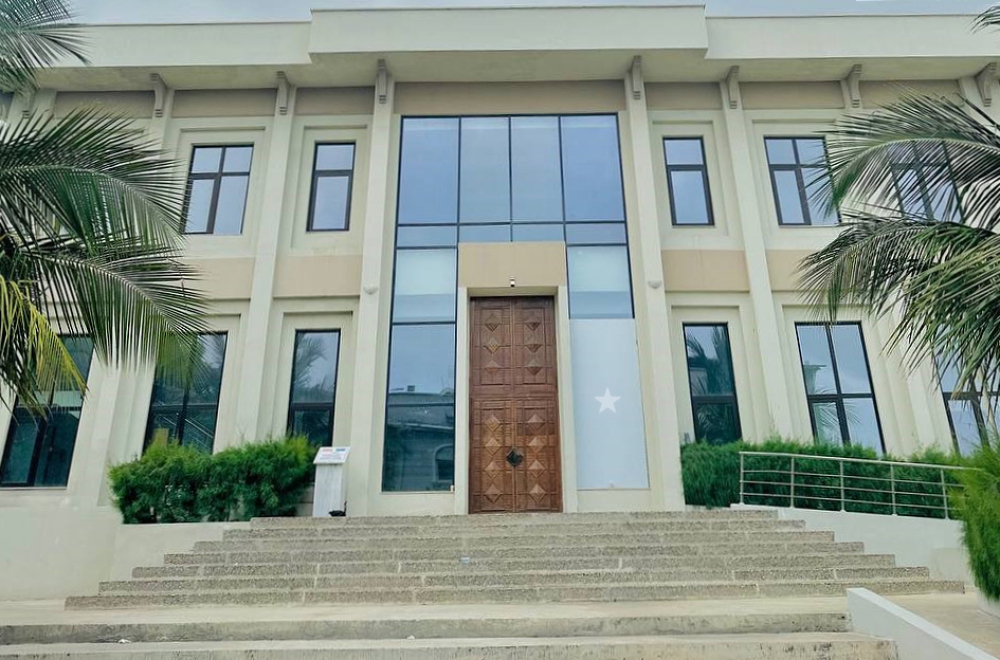

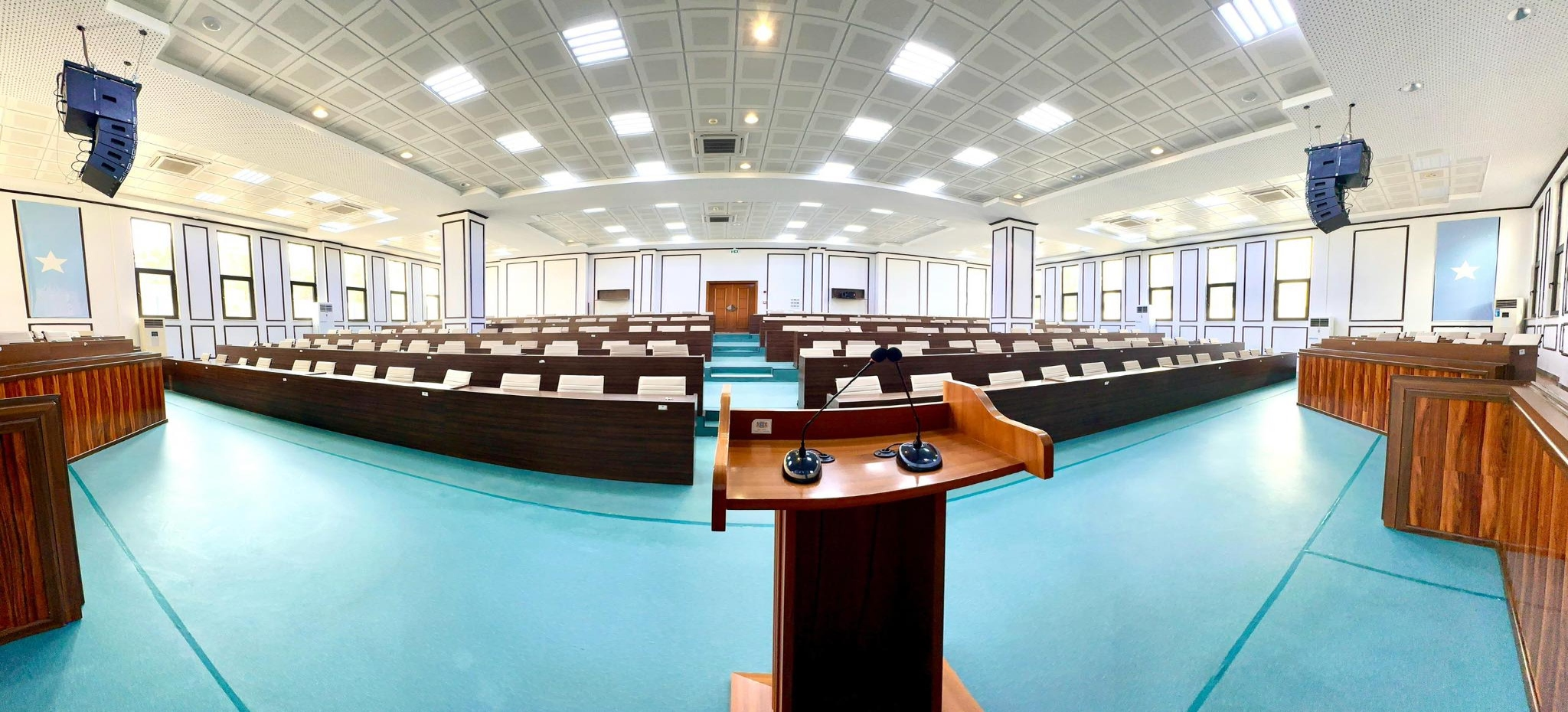
- House of the People; Mogadishu, Somalia

Website
- www.parliament.gov.so

The Federal Parliament of Somalia (Somali: Golaha Shacabka Soomaaliya; often Baarlamaanka Federaalka Soomaaliya; Arabic: المجلس الإتحادي صومالي) is the national parliament of Somalia. Formed in August 2012, it is based in the capital Mogadishu and is bicameral, consisting of an upper house (Senate) and a lower house (House of the People).

== Parliamentary history ==
The first parliament in independent Somalia was the unicameral National Assembly (1960–1969). It was followed by the unicameral House of the People (1969–2012) which did not function during the Somali Civil War. The unicameral Federal Parliament was established in 2012, and in 2016 was reformulated as a bicameral body, when the Senate of Somalia was established.

== Establishment ==
=== Post-transition roadmap ===
As part of the official "Roadmap for the End of Transition", a political process devised by former Prime Minister Abdiweli Mohamed Ali Gaas which provided benchmarks leading toward the establishment of permanent democratic institutions in Somalia by late August 2012, members of Somalia's then ruling Transitional Federal Government (TFG) and other administrative officials met in the northeastern town of Garowe in February 2012 to discuss post-transition arrangements. After extensive deliberations attended by regional actors and international observers, the conference ended in a signed agreement between TFG President Sharif Sheikh Ahmed, Prime Minister Abdiweli Gaas, Speaker of Parliament Sharif Hassan Sheikh Aden, Puntland President Abdirahman Mohamed Farole, Galmudug President Mohamed Ahmed Alim and Ahlu Sunna Waljama'a representative Khalif Abdulkadir Noor. The agreement stipulated a new 225-member bicameral parliament would be formed, consisting of an upper house seating 54 senators and a lower house, of which 30% of the National Constituent Assembly (NCA) would be earmarked for women, the president would be appointed via constitutional election, and the prime minister would be selected by the president, who would then name a council of ministers.

On 23 June, TFG and regional leaders approved a draft constitution after several days of deliberation. The NCA, which consists of 30 elders drawn from each of the country's four major Somali clans (Darod, Dir, Hawiye, Rahanweyn) and 15 from a coalition of minority groups based on a power-sharing formula, overwhelmingly passed the new constitution on 1 August. 96% of the 645 delegates present voted for it, 2% against it and 2% abstained. For the constitution to come into effect, it must be ratified by the new parliament.

=== Technical Selection Committee ===
On 18 August 2012, a list of 202 new parliamentarians was released, with a total of 215 legislators eventually sworn in on 20 August. A further 15 nominated lawmakers were approved by the Technical Selection Committee (TSC), an independent body officially tasked with vetting the applicants. However, verification of their paperwork was still pending before they could be officially sworn into parliament.

The remaining candidates that were submitted by the NCA's elders to the TSC were rejected for failing to meet specific criteria agreed upon by stakeholders that partook in earlier agreements, including the Galkayo and Garowe Principles accords. The minimal selection criteria required potential MPs to be Somali nationals possessing a "sound mind", to have at least a high school diploma, to be capable of carrying out parliamentary duties, and to have no reported links with warlords, rebels, armed groups and other potential spoiler elements. The TSC also based its screening procedure on detailed background information on the parliamentary candidates that was forwarded to it by the United Nations and the African Union.

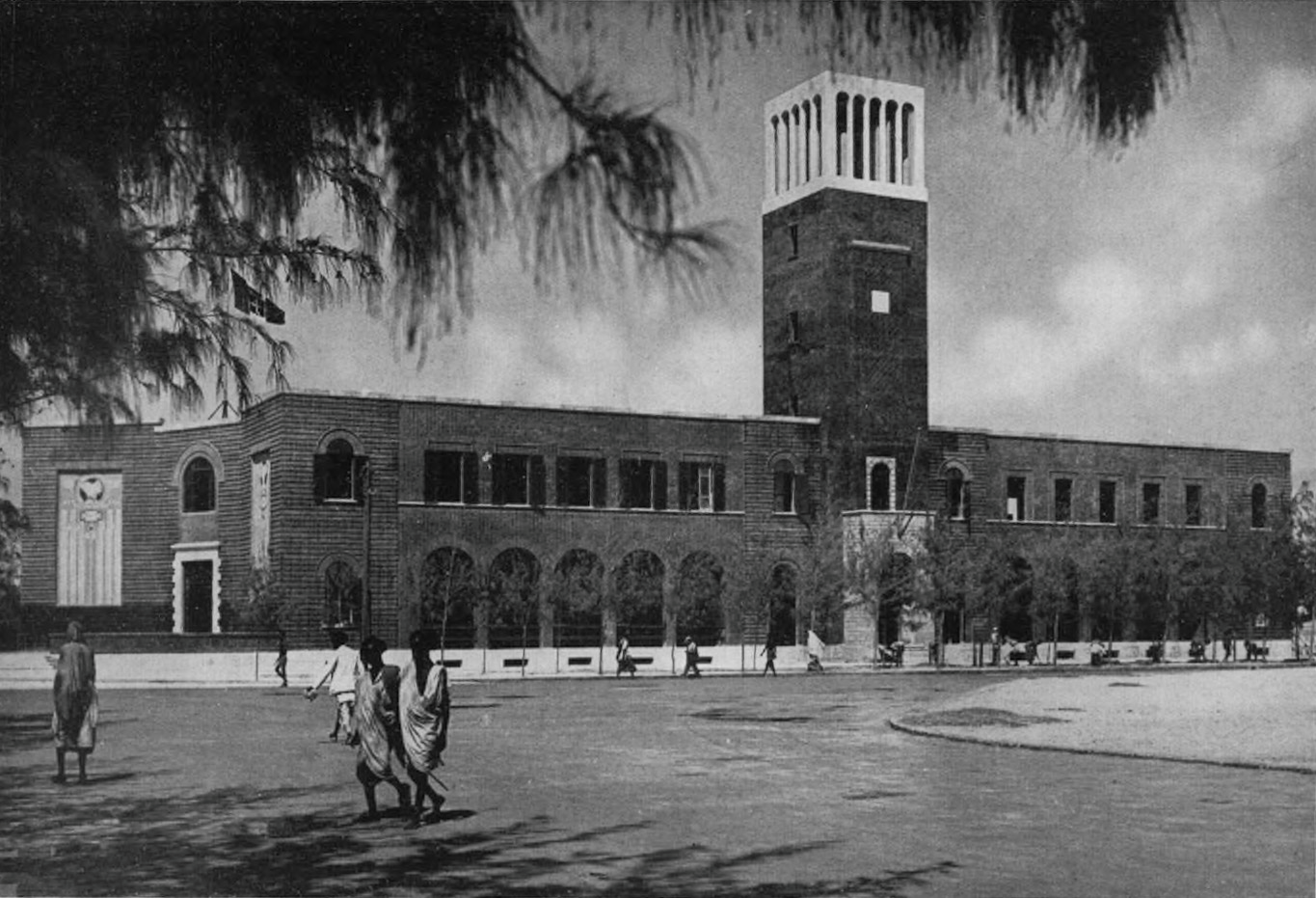
The original Casa del Fascio in 1939, which later served as Somalia's first parliament building.

=== Inauguration ===
The inaugural session of parliament was held on 20 August 2012, at the Mogadishu airport since the main parliament building was undergoing renovations. The outgoing President, Prime Minister and Speaker of Parliament all attended the ceremony in the capital, which witnessed the swearing in of most of the MPs and the selection of a new interim Speaker.

=== 10th Parliament (2016) ===
The tenth Parliament of Somalia was inaugurated on 27 December 2016.

In a statement to the United Nations Security Council, Michael Keating, Special Representative and Head of the United Nations Assistance Mission in Somalia (UNSOM), noted that the Upper House of Parliament had come into existence, comprising 54 members chosen on the basis of the federal member state rather than on a clan basis; the electorate had expanded from 135 male elders in 2012, to more than 13,000, 30% of whom were women; and voting had taken place in six locations around the country, reflecting emerging state structures.

The constitutional mandate of the parliamentarians ended on 27 December 2020, and Somalia had no parliament until the swearing-in of the 11th Parliament in 2022.

=== 11th Parliament (2022) ===
Members of the 11th Federal Parliament of Somalia were sworn-in in Mogadishu on 14 April 2022. 250 out of 275 members of the House of the People and 40 out of 54 members of the Senate took their oaths of office.

Abdi Hashi Abdullahi was reelected as Speaker of the Senate, and Ali Shacban Ibrahim and Abdullahi Ali Hirsi were elected as First and Second Deputy Speakers on 26 April 2022. Sheikh Aden Madobe was elected as Speaker of the House of the People on 27 April 2022, while Saadia Yasin Haji Samatar and Abdullahi Omar Abshirow were elected as First and Second Deputy Speakers the next day.

== Speaker of Parliament ==
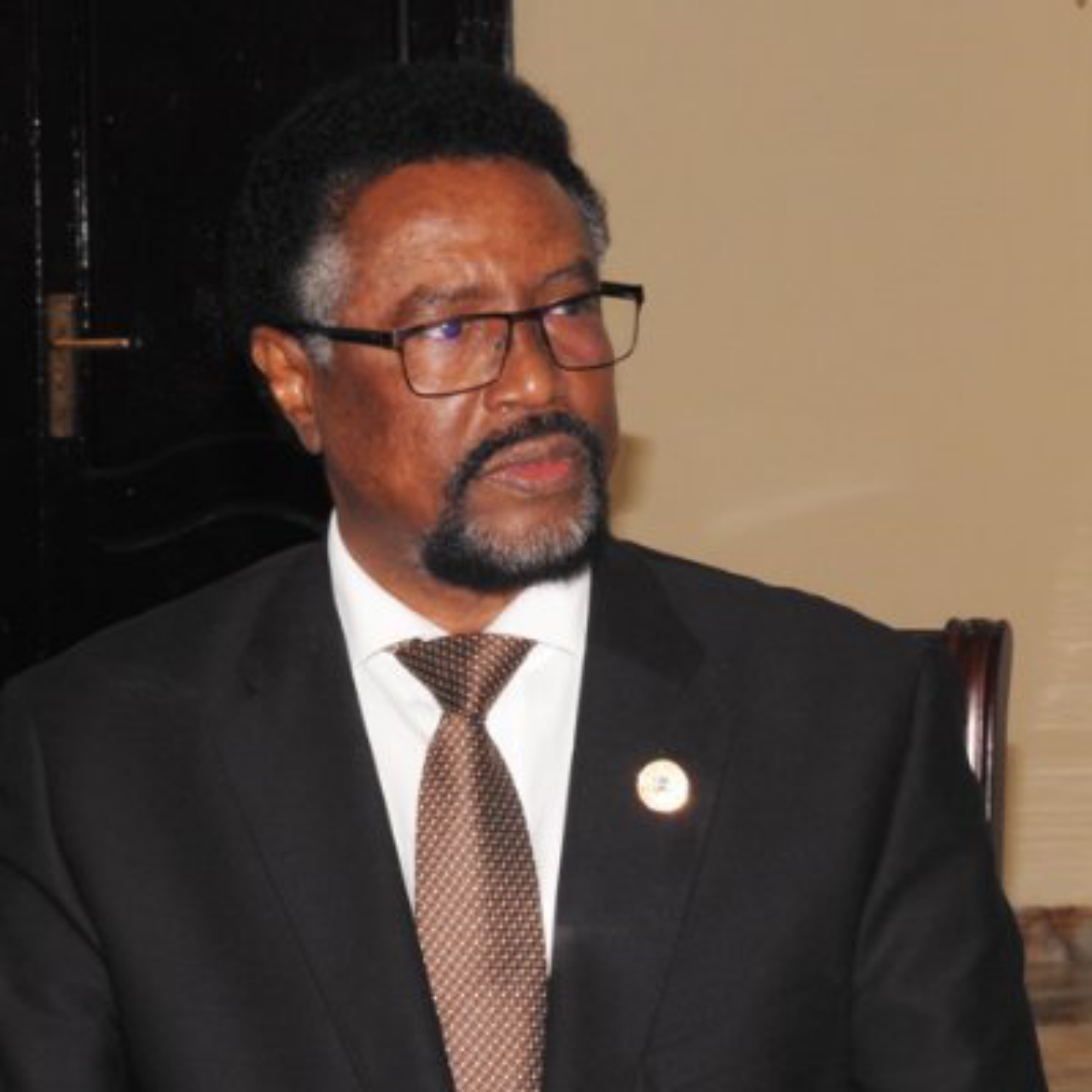
Mohamed Mursal Sheikh Abdurahman, the former Speaker of the Federal Parliament.

On 20 August 2012, former Somali National Army (SNA) General Muse Hassan Sheikh Sayid Abdulle was appointed Interim Speaker and Acting President. Voting for a new Speaker of Parliament was held on 28 August 2012, with former Minister of Transportation and Minister of Labor and Sports Mohamed Osman Jawari elected as Speaker. Jaylaani Nur Ikar and Mahad Abdalle Awad were serving as First Deputy Speaker and Second Deputy Speaker, respectively.

== Duties ==
The Federal Parliament of Somalia constitutes the legislative branch of government, with the Federal Government of Somalia representing the executive division.

The parliament elects the President, Speaker of Parliament and Deputy Speakers. It also has the authority to pass and veto laws.

In addition, the parliament is tasked with selecting the ultimate number and boundaries of the autonomous regional states (officially, Federal Member States) within the Federal Republic of Somalia.

On 2 April 2014, the parliamentary committee of interior and security announced that it would soon establish a committee to oversee the federalism process in Somalia's constituent provinces.

== Composition ==
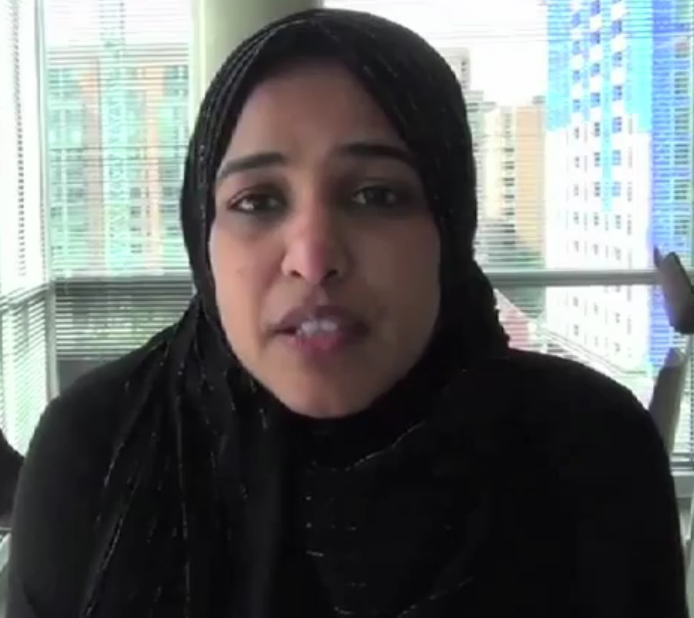
Parliamentary consultant Hodan Ahmed

The Federal Parliament of Somalia is bicameral, consisting of an upper house (Senate) and a lower house (House of the People). It includes many professionals and university graduates. At least 30% of seats are legally reserved for women, a quota secured by Somali parliamentary consultant Hodan Ahmed and women political leaders. Ahmed had also helped form the Somali Women Parliamentary Association in 2009 in the preceding Transitional Federal Parliament.

An official list of Members of the Federal Parliament was first published on 17 August 2012 by the Office of the Somali Parliament.

=== Senate ===
The Senate, or upper house, was elected during Somali parliamentary election held on 2016 and it contains 54 Senators.

=== House of the People ===
The House of the People, or lower house, is eventually expected to comprise 275 members of Parliament (MPs).

== Committees ==
The Federal Parliament has a number of committees, which are tasked with carrying out its duties. They include:

- Oversight, Review and Implementation Committee
- Rules of Procedure, Ethics, Discipline and Immunity Committee
- Judiciary, Religious Sites and Religious Affairs Committee
- Internal Affairs, Regional Administration and Security Committee
- Truth, Reconciliation and Restitution Committee
- Committee on Budget, Finance, Planning, International Cooperation and Financial Oversight of Public Institutions
- Foreign Affairs Committee
- Defence Committee
- Human Rights, Women and Humanitarian Affairs Committee
- Social Services Development Committee
- National Resource Committee
- Information & Media, Public Awareness, Culture Post and Telecommunication Committee
- Committee for Roads, Ports, Airports, Energy and Transport
- Committee for Economy, Trade and Industry

In March 2015, the Council of Ministers agreed to establish a new commission tasked with overseeing the nationalization and integration of security forces in the country.

== List of Parliaments ==
- 1st Somali Parliament (1956–1960) – majority party: Somali Youth League
- 2nd Somali Parliament (1960–1964) – majority party: Somali Youth League
- 3rd Somali Parliament (1964–1968) – majority party: Somali Youth League
- 4th Somali Parliament (1968–1970) – majority party: Supreme Revolutionary Council
- 5th Somali Parliament (1980–1986) – majority party: Supreme Revolutionary Council
- 6th Somali Parliament (1986–1990) – majority party: Supreme Revolutionary Council
- 7th Somali Parliament (2000–2004) – majority party: none
- 8th Somali Parliament (2004–2012) – majority party: none
- 9th Somali Parliament (2012–2016) – majority party: Peace and Development Party
- 10th Somali Parliament (2016–2020) – majority party: Tayo Political Party
- 11th Somali Parliament (2022–2026) – majority party: Union for Peace and Development Party

== Voting system ==
Article 47 of the Provisional Constitution stipulates that "the regulations concerning[...] elections at the Federal Government level[...] shall be defined in special laws enacted by the House of the People of the Federal Parliament of Somalia."

== Tenure ==
According to the Office of the Somali Parliament, sitting legislators are mandated to serve from 2016 to 2020. The Parliamentary term elapsed on 27 December 2020, without an announced election date.

== Memberships ==
The Federal Parliament of Somalia is a member of the Inter-Parliamentary Union (IPU), the international organization of parliaments.

== See also ==
- Cabinet of Somalia
- Judiciary of Somalia
- List of speakers of the Parliament of Somalia
