= Daljir Party =

Political party in Somalia

Daljir Party Xisbiga Daljir
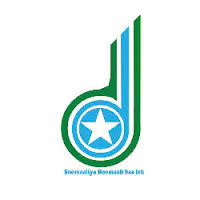
- Chairperson: Hassan Moalim
- Secretary-General: Ahmed Moalim Fiqi
- Founded: 1 December 2014
- Dissolved: 4 October 2018
- Split from: Alliance for the Re-liberation of Somalia
- Merged into: Union for Peace and Development Party
- Headquarters: 7 Airport Road, Wadajir District Mogadishu
- Ideology: Liberalism; Cultural conservatism Islamic democracy
- Political position: Economic: Centre to centre-left Social: Centre to centre-right
- Slogan: Guardians of the country, the people, the identity and the common good

Website
- xisbigadaljir.so

The Daljir Party (Somali: Xisbiga Daljir, abbr. XD or DP) was a liberal political party in Somalia. It developed from the tradition of socially conservative Islamism, but officially abandoned this ideology in favour of "conservative democracy".

Well known members of the party included the former Minister of Interior Abdilqadir Ali Omar, Abdikarim Hussein Jama former Minister of Information and current rector of City University Mogadishu and many Islamist and radical movements.

Hassan Moalim was the chairman of the party. The party's General Secretary Ahmed Moalim Fiqi was a former Somali ambassador to Sudan and served as the Director of Somalia's National Intelligence and Security Agency.

== Founding ==
Daljir Party was initially a loose association of like minded individuals that announced a common political platform In 2012 in a ceremony attended by politicians, academics, members of the then transitional federal parliament, Ministers and Islamic Scholars.

It was relaunched on December 1 2014 after a two-week conference attended by Somalis from all regions of the country.

In the words of the current Secretary General who was a founding member of the party some of the "objectives of its establishment was to lay the foundation for a system that is beyond the failed tribal-based politics that is prevalent currently.'

== National Leadership ==
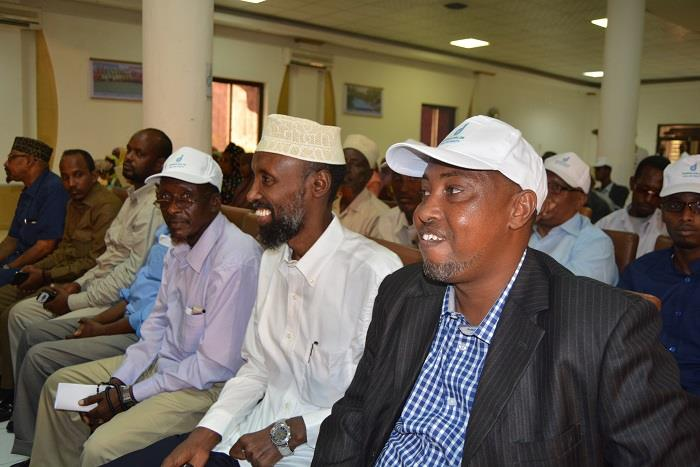
MP and former minister of interior affairs Abdilqadir Ali Omar (second from the right) attended the first anniversary of party

The National leadership was elected in the inaugural party conference with a minimum quota of 30% of positions being reserved for female members of the party.

- The chairman of the party is Mr. Hassan Moalim. He is currently a member of the Federal Parliament of Somalia serving his second term, he is a graduate of the University of London — School of Oriental and African Studies, with an M.Sc. in Political science, he also served as an influential State Minister of the Presidency during the administration of Sharif Sheikh Ahmed.
- The party has two Deputy Chairs; Mr. Hassan Ibrahim who resigned his position as head of the FAO humanitarian response coordinator in the Syrian Civil War to take up this position and Dr. Hanna Abbas a medical graduate of the African International University of Khartoum, Sudan.
- The Secretary General of the party is Amb. Ahmed Moalim Fiqi, a seasoned diplomat and security expert who served as Director General of the National Intelligence and Security Agency and Presidential Candidate for the Galmudug State of Somalia. Prior to this, he served as Ambassador to the Sudan from 2010 to 2011.

The youth wing of the party was formed on 1 September 2015 with entrepreneur Mr. Nuur Sharif Inji being elected as the chairman of the Daljir Youth Wing on 19 September 2015.

Ms. Hamdi Bilan Musse was appointed the interim chair-lady of the Women's league of Daljir Party.

== Ideology ==
The platform of Daljir party was broadly developed by individuals who were initially part of the loosely organised Tajamuc which was formed by the late Sheikh Mohamed Moalim Hassan (the father of Islamic revivalism in Somalia) and his supporters.

The party is described to be socially centrist and advocates a strong role for the state in regulating the free-market economy of Somalia so as to reduce the effects of adverse business practices and create a conducive environment for investment and the large scale reconstruction required to take place in Somalia after the two decades of civil war.

The party closely espouses a platform of conservative democracy that is tailored to the cultural and political realities of Somalia as well as a Western-oriented Foreign Policy. Daljir also rejects radical Islamism as a form of governance appropriate for Somalia and is a member of both the Somali Parties Forum uniting 14 Political Parties, and is a constituent member of the Forum for Unity and Democracy, which are broad based coalitions united to strengthen the democratic parliamentary system of the Federal Republic of Somalia and which are committed to peace and stability.

Daljir is more liberal than Islamist parties in some other countries. For example, they recognize democracy, pluralism, tolerance of other religions, and women's rights as key to Somalia's development process and they do not support extreme revolutionary movements or any kind of Muslim extremism and terror groups such as ISIS.

The party is believed to have very strong anti-Ethiopian policy, stating that Ethiopia's meddling in Somali affairs is a primary reason for Somalia's continued strife.

The Heritage Institute for Policy Studies is widely believed to be an arena for members of Daljir party to develop policy proposals and political platforms, serving as a political think-tank for the party.

Both the former director of Heritage Institute for Policy Studies Abdirahman Aynte and current director Abdirashid Hashi are affiliated to the party.

The City University of Mogadishu is also seen as an institution the reflects Daljir's commitment to reviving the education sector in Somalia. Its dean is Dr Abdikarim Jama, who was the Minister of Information, Posts & Telecommunication during the last Transitional Federal Government in 2010. Jama was also Chief of Staff to the President between 2009 and 2010.

Goobjoog Media is an independent Radio and website based in Mogadishu, is widely viewed as a sympathetic news organisation to the party.

== Elections ==
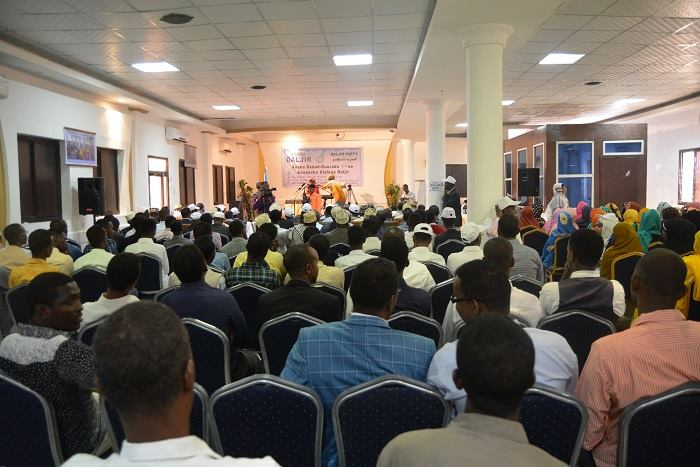
Daljir Party meeting in Mogadishu, Somalia

Upon formation of Galmudug as a federal member state of Somalia, Daljir party officially backed Mr. Ali Gacal Casir to run as it candidate for the speaker-ship of the Galmudug parliament, which he won in the second round of voting beating his nearest competitor Ali Gafoow Maalin by 11 votes in the 66 member parliament.

In the subsequent election on July 4, 2015 for regional president the Daljir party candidate Amb. Ahmed Fiqi Moalim lost the contest to current President of Galmudug state Abdikarim Hussein Guleed the former Minister for Internal Security in the Federal Government of Somalia.

The election was notable for the many allegations of fraud and corruption.

As of 3 December 2016, Mr. Abshir Mohamed has won election as Upper House member for Galmudug state, while both Daljir Party Chairman Mr. Hassan Moalim and party Secreatary General Amb.Ahmed Fiqi have won seats as members of the Federal Parliament.

== Notable members of Daljir Party ==
- Abdirahman Aynte — Minister of Planning and International Cooperation of the FGS.
- Abdishakur Mire Adan — Former Minister of Information of Puntland.
- Abdikarim Jama — Rector of City University Mogadishu.
- Sheikh Yusuf Hussein Aynte — Current Head of the Association of Somali Imams.
- Abshir Mohamed Ahmed — Somali Media Tycoon; Owner of Goobjoog FM and TV, Maandeeq FM & Gool FM
- Abdilqadir Ali Omar — Former Minister Of Interior and Former MP, he was also First Deputy of Islamic Courts Union
- Ali Mohamed Ahmed) — Hamar Custom Manager (Federal government).
- Abdirahman Janaqow — Former Minister of Justice (Transitional federal government).
- Dr. Hassan Barise — Founder of City University.
- Mohamed Omar Arte — Current Deputy Prime Minister of the Federal Government of Somalia is considered to be sympathetic to Daljir.
- Mursal Saney — Deputy Director of Heritage Institute for Policy Studies and former Senior advisor to President Sheikh Sharif Sheikh Ahmed

== See also ==
- Political parties in Somalia
