= Operation Indian Ocean =

2014–2015 Somali–AMISOM–US mission against al-Shabaab

- Part of the Somali Civil War (2009–present)
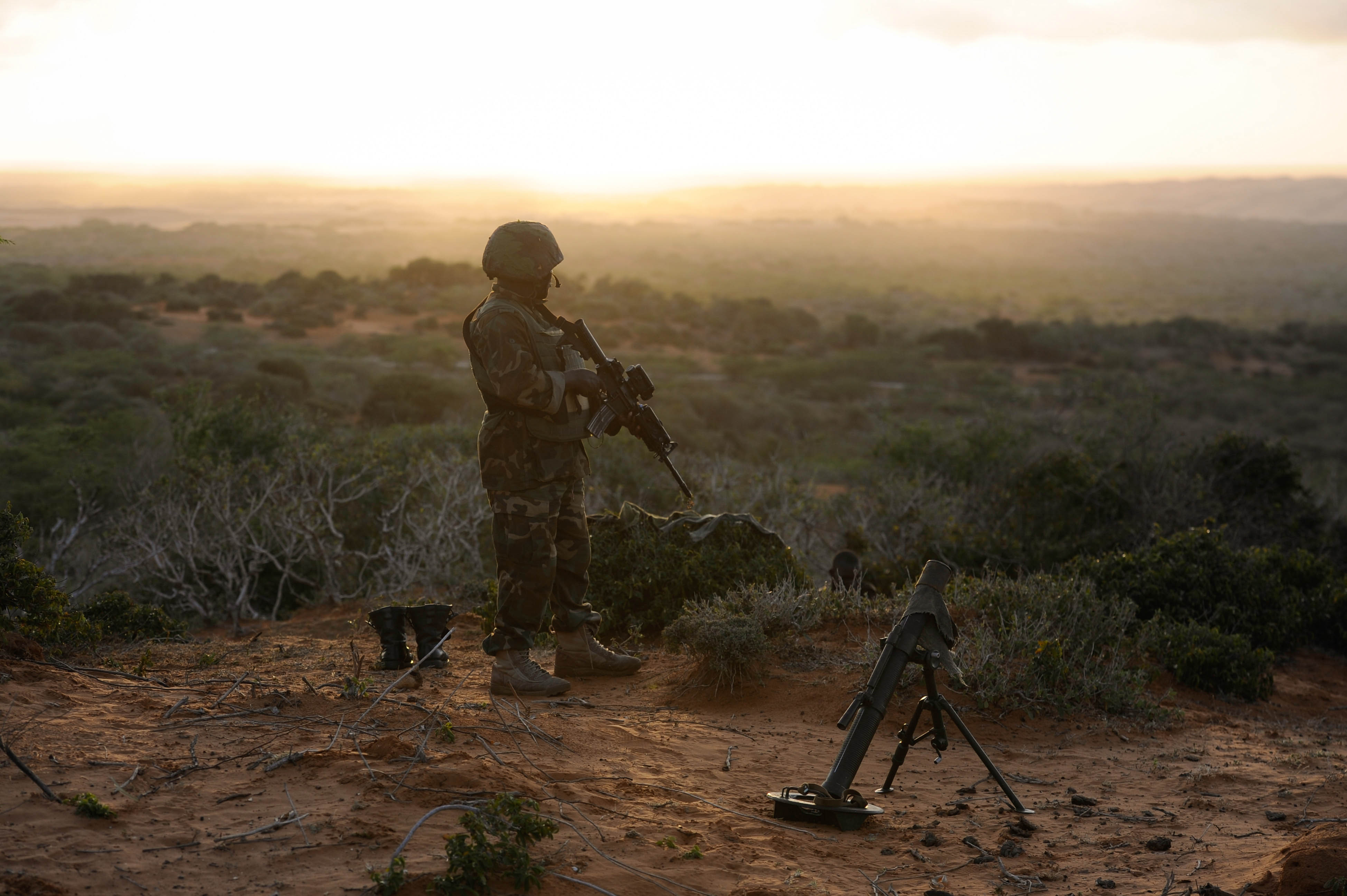
- AMISOM soldier on a hill at Barawe, one of the towns captured during the operation
Date	16 August 2014 – 23 May 2015 (9 months and 1 week)
Location	Somalia
Territorial changes	Joint forces capture Abesale, Baddi Keen, Buq Gosar, El Ade, Far Libah, Bakool province, Golweyn, Jerlio, Bulo Marer, Fidow, Kurtunwarey, Kililka Shinaha, Dhin Garas, Hiran province, El Garas, Aboto-barrey, El-Shel, Arrale, Kawada, Lagta Berta, Warsheikh, Rage Elle, Maryan-Gubay, Adale, Bulo Marer district, Barawe, Bulogudud, Yoontoy, Koban, Muganbow, Baar Sanguni, Bangenni, Biroole, Koday, Bula Haji, Abdalla Biroole, Yooman, El-deer Mirgab, Anfac, Hero Lugole, Rahale, Jar, Janbiley, Bulo-Jadid, Bulo-Yusuf, El Jarmed, Janay-Abdalla, Farwamo, Kudha Island Aboorey, Hudur district, Burweyn

Belligerents
Federal Government of Somalia: Jubaland; Ahlu Sunna Waljama'a; AMISOM; United States	Al-Shabaab

Commanders and leaders
(Somalia) Dahir Adan Elmi (Burundi) Cyprien Hakiza (Uganda) Dick Olum (United States) David M. Rodriguez	Ahmed Godane †; Ahmad Umar

Casualties and losses
	Over 700 militants surrender Commander defections: Zakariya Ismail Ahmed Hersi defects; Sheikh Osman Sheikh Mohamed defects; Abdullahi Mohamed "Madoobe" defects; Bashaan Ali Hassan defects; Commander deaths: Tahliil Abdishakur killed; Ibrahim Filey killed; Yusuf Dheeq killed; Aden Garaar killed; Mohamed Musa killed

Operation Indian Ocean was a military operation by the African Union Mission to Somalia with assistance from Somali militias against the Al-Shabaab militant group from August 2014.

== Overview ==
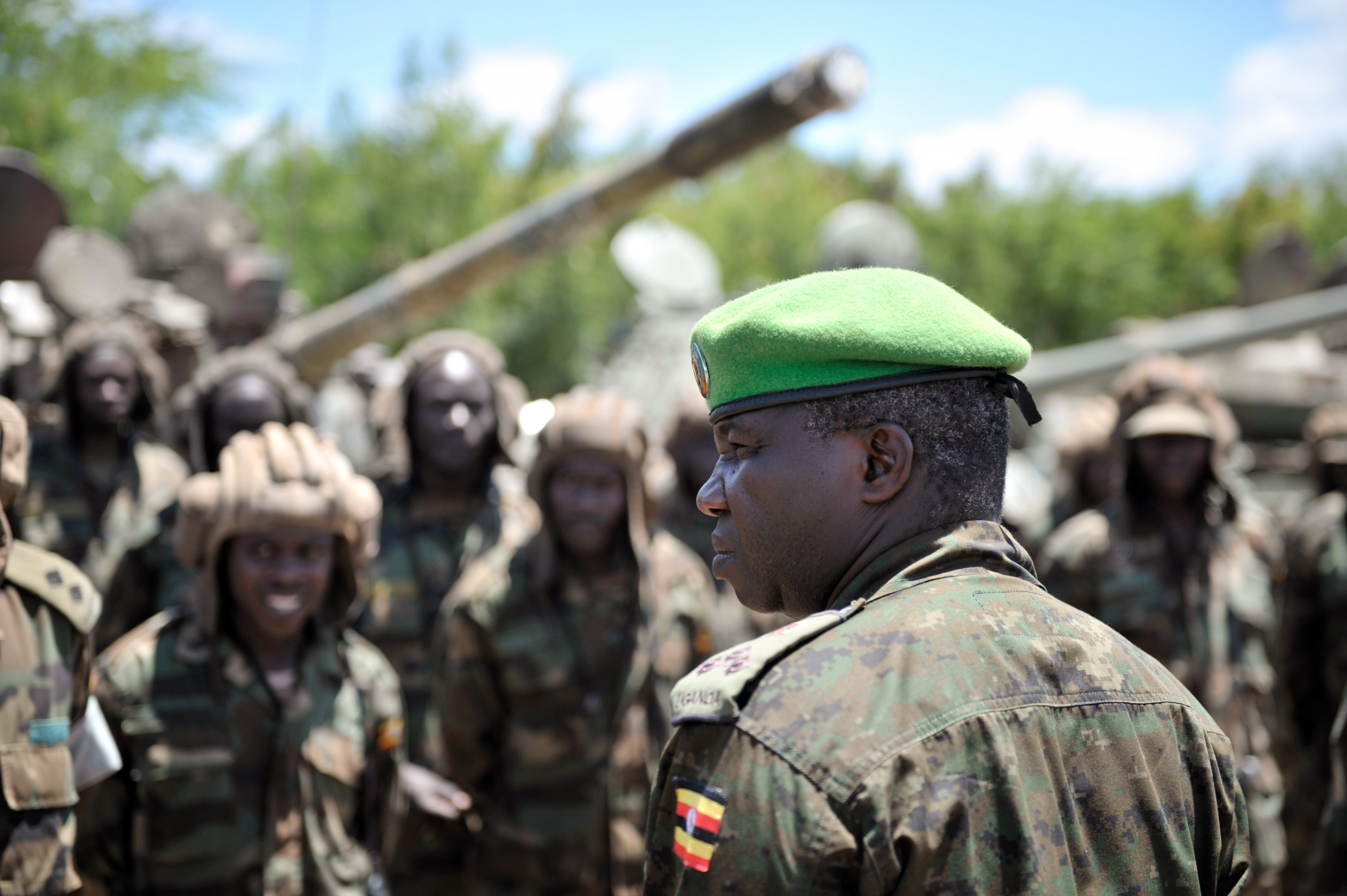
Brig. Gen. Dick Olum, the leading commander of the UPDF troops in Somalia, addresses soldiers during Operation Indian Ocean

The operation was launched on 16 August 2014. It was aimed at eliminating the remaining insurgent-held areas in the countryside. On 1 September 2014, a U.S. airstrike carried out near the town of Haawaay as part of the broader mission killed Al-Shabaab leader Moktar Ali Zubeyr. U.S. authorities hailed the raid as a major symbolic and operational loss for Al-Shabaab. Political analysts likewise suggested that the insurgent leader's death will likely lead to Al-Shabaab's fragmentation and eventual dissolution.

In addition, the Somali government presented a 45-day amnesty to all moderate members of the militant group. Prime Minister Abdiweli Sheikh Ahmed announced that the pardon offer had begun to be taken up by many defectors. By October 2014, 700 Al-Shabaab members had surrendered to the state authorities. Among the latter militants was senior commander Zakariya Ismail Ahmed Hersi, who turned himself in to local police in the southwestern Gedo province in late December 2014. Sheikh Osman Sheikh Mohamed, the commander of Al-Shabaab's militia in the Luq area, as well as landmine expert Abdullahi Mohamed "Madoobe", and senior officer Bashaan Ali Hassan ("Mohamed Ali") followed suit and defected in early 2015.

Additional senior Al-Shabaab commanders were also killed or died in combat. Among the slain militant leaders was intelligence chief Tahliil Abdishakur, who was killed in a U.S. drone airstrike in December 2014; commander Ibrahim Filey, who was killed during a skirmish with Somali army troops in January 2015; chief of external operations and planning for intelligence and security Yusuf Dheeq, who was killed in a U.S. drone airstrike in January 2015; head of external operations and mastermind of the Westgate shopping mall attack Aden Garaar, who was killed in a U.S. drone airstrike in March 2015; and Gedo province commander Mohamed Musa, who was killed during a skirmish with Somali army troops in March 2015.

== Timeline ==
=== August 2014 ===
==== 16 August ====
- Hiraan region Governor Abdifatah Hassan Afrah indicates that Somali government forces assisted by AMISOM troops liberated a number of towns in the region from the Al-Shabaab militants. Among the captured local areas are Abesale, Badi Keen, Buuq Goosaar, El Ade and Far Libah.

==== 17 August ====
- Somali national army forces assisted by AMISOM troops begin a major military operation against Al-Shabaab in central Somalia. The move comes 24 hours after the national chief of military announced the start of new offensives against the insurgent group. Hiran Governor Abdifatah Hassan indicated that the allied forces are slated to liberate the remaining parts of the province that are under militant control, and in the process remove roadblocks that the insurgents erected. An RBC Radio correspondent in Beledweyne also reports that the allied forces have left Buloburte in Hiran and are heading toward Burane in the Middle Shabelle province. Additionally, Hassan indicates that AMISOM's Ethiopian contingent left Elbur in the Galgadud province and are bound for Al-Shabaab controlled areas.

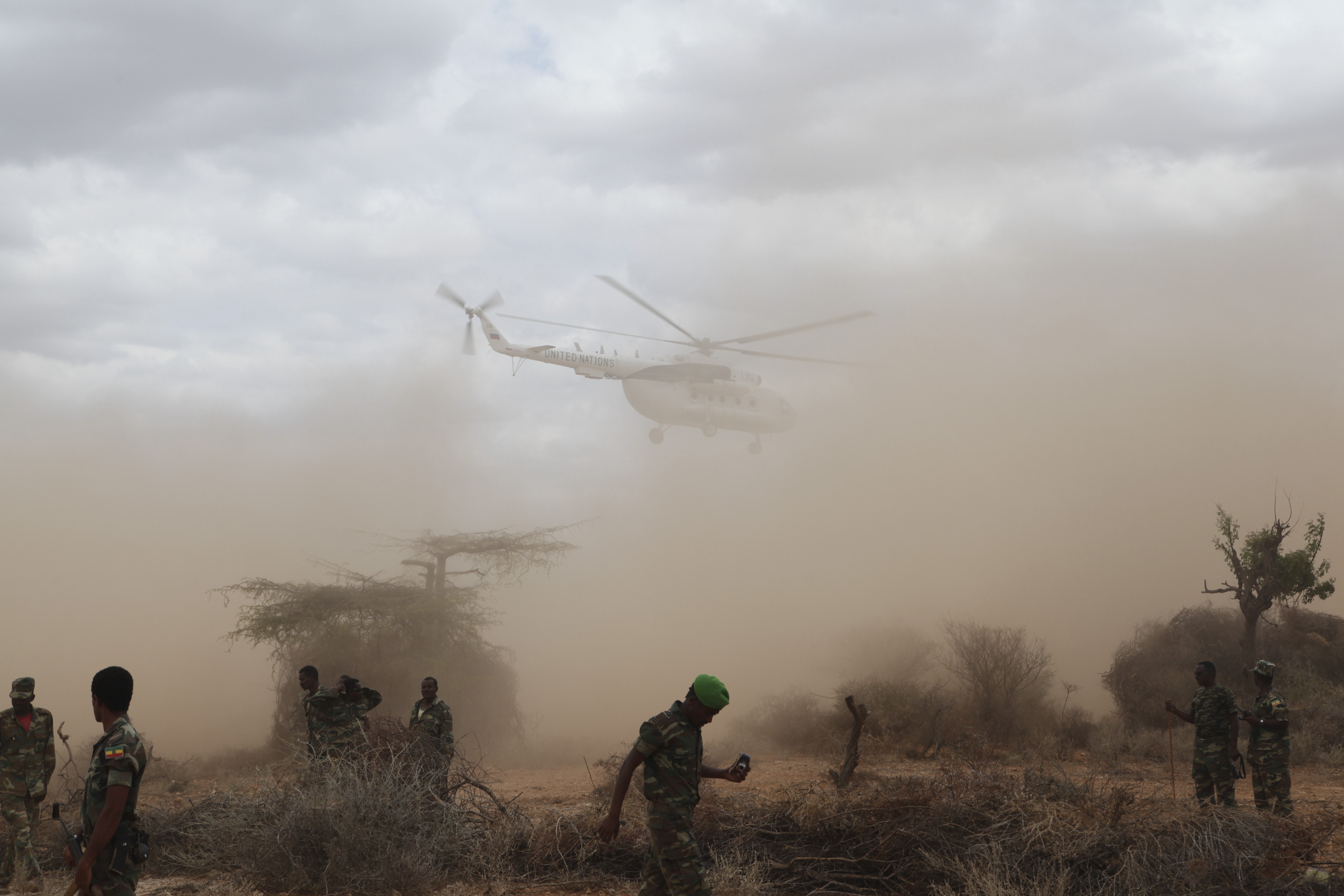
UN helicopter carrying President Abdiweli Gaas departing from Tiyeglow, September 2014.

==== 25 August ====
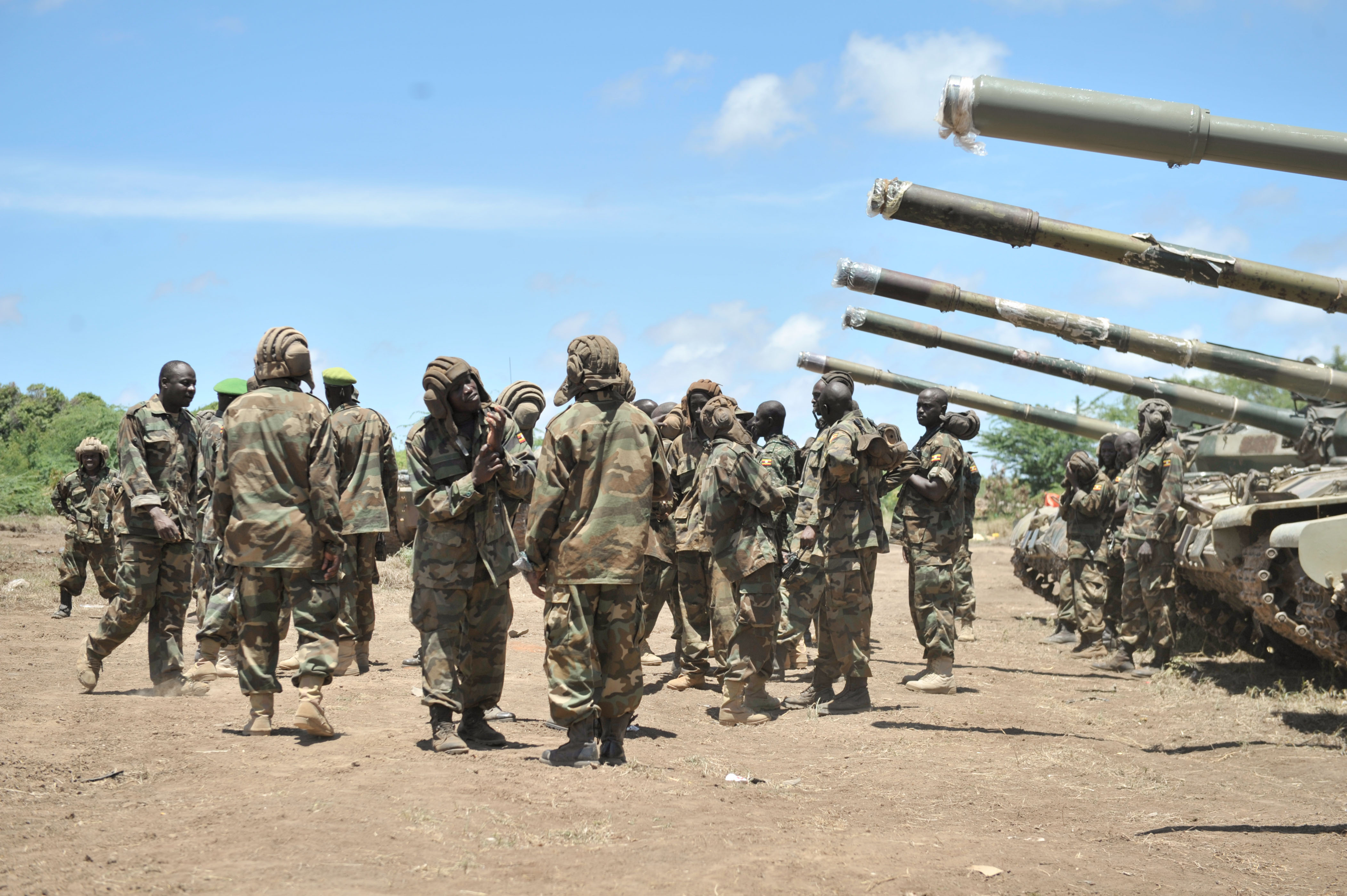
Ugandan tank crews on 29 August

- Ethiopian AMISOM troops accompanied by Somali fighters capture Tiyeglow in Bakool Region from Al-Shabaab. The town is situated around 530 km northeast of Mogadishu along the main road linking Beledweyne and Baidoa. Al-Shabaab fighters mounted no resistance, fleeing instead. According to AMISOM, the successful military operation deprives the insurgent group of high extortion fees that it would previously charge to vehicles traveling along the town's principal road. The siege also now gives the Somali government full control of Bakool. Al-Shabaab planted roadside explosive devices before fleeing, which AMISOM had begun defusing.

==== 30 August ====
- General Abdirizak Khalif Elmi, frontline armed forces commander-in-chief, announces that Somali government forces assisted by AMISOM troops have seized Bulo Marer in the Lower Shabelle province from Al-Shabaab. Located between 115 km to 120 km south of Mogadishu, the town previously served as a strategic base and a tax collection area for the insurgent group, from which it would launch attacks on other areas. According to witnesses, the militants mounted a heavy armed resistance, with the battle for control of the town lasting several hours. The joint allied forces captured Goolweyn and Jerlio before heading to Bulo Marer. Government and AMISOM forces are now marching toward the port city of Barawe, Al-Shabaab's last major stronghold in the province. The militants reportedly already transported radio broadcasting equipment for the purpose.
- Hiran Governor Abdifatah Hassan announces that the Somali National Army assisted by Djiboutian AMISOM forces are securing adjacent areas before entering Jalalaqsi in the Hiran province. Al-Shabaab militants had vacated the town the day before ahead of the allied forces' march.

==== 31 August ====
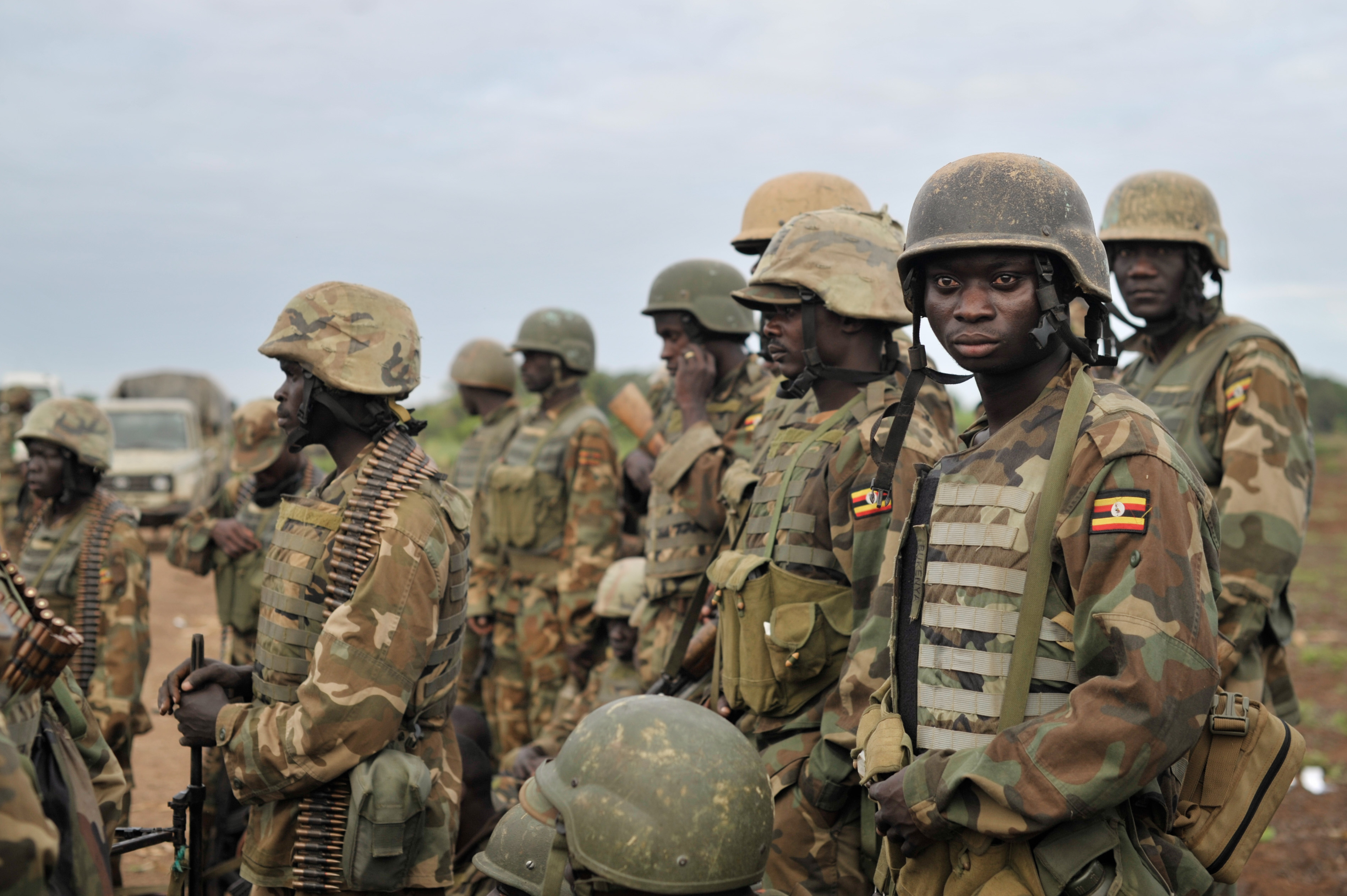
Uganda People's Defence Force soldiers during the operation

- Heavily armed Al-Shabaab militants attacked the Godka Jilacow prison in Mogadishu, a key interrogation center run by the National Intelligence and Security Agency. The raid was an apparent attempt to free other insurgents held at the facility. It begins when a vehicle carrying explosives detonated at the prison gates, with militants armed with guns and grenades then attempting to penetrate the compound. According to Somali police Capt. Mohamed Hussein, prison guards managed to repel the attack, killing all of the attackers. Witnesses also report that no prisoners were able to escape. The Ministry of National Security spokesman Mohamed Yusuf Osman confirmed that seven Al-Shabaab fighters, three security guards and one civilian were killed during the gunfight. Al-Shabaab later claims responsibility for the attack.
- Somali government forces assisted by AMISOM soldiers begin a military offensive against Al-Shabaab insurgents in the Middle Shabelle province. According to regional Governor Ali Mohamud Gudlawe, the march is part of a larger, nationwide security cleanup operation to remove the militants from their remaining bastions. The joint forces are reportedly heading from Mahaday to villages situated near the local river, with residents indicating that an allied convoy is making its way toward the principal corridor adjoining the Hiran province. Al-Shabaab spokesman Sheikh Abdiasis Abu Mus’ab states that his group will try to halt the government and AMISOM forces' advance by laying siege to towns that the allied forces have liberated. President Hassan Sheikh Mohamud a few hours later orders a full public inquiry into the attack.
- Somali government forces assisted by AMISOM troops capture Fidow in Middle Shabelle from Al-Shabaab. It is situated 60 km from the provincial capital Jowhar. The militants reportedly vacated the village ahead of the raid.
- Somali government forces and AMISOM troops seize Kurtunwaarey in Lower Shabelle from Al-Shabaab. It is situated 20 km west of the Bulo Marer district. The militants reportedly vacated the town before the arrival of the allied forces.

=== September 2014 ===
==== 1 September ====
- Arriving from the Middle Shabelle regional capital of Jowhar, Somali government forces assisted by AMISOM troops from the Burundian contingent captured Kililka Shiinaha and Dhiin Garas from Al-Shabaab. According to Somali National Army mobilizer Abdirizak Khalif Elmi, the allied forces are now heading toward Jalalaqsi. Lower Shabelle Governor Abdulkadir Mohamed Nur Siidi also indicates that the joint forces will lay siege to the Al-Shabaab bastions of Saakow and Bu'ale in the Middle Jubba province.
- U.S. military forces conduct an operation against Al-Shabaab in southern Somalia. Pentagon Press Secretary Rear Adm. John Kirby indicates that they are still assessing the raids' impact. Masked militants subsequently begin mass arrests of local residents under charges of espionage. Additionally, a senior Somali intelligence official states that the U.S. drone strike was targeting the Al-Shabaab leader Ahmed Abdi Godane (Moktar Ali Zubeyr) as he was leaving a gathering of the group's senior commanders. The meeting was reportedly over the ongoing joint offensive by Somali military and AMISOM forces against Al-Shabaab's remaining bastions. Speaking on condition of anonymity, the official adds that the attack occurred in a forest adjacent to Sablale district, and also suggests that Godane may have been killed during the drone strike. U.S. officials later clarify that the strike was carried out via both drone and manned aircraft, with U.S. special operations forces destroying a vehicle and training camp using laser-guided munitions and Hellfire missiles. According to a U.S. government source, a Twitter account that was linked by American authorities to Al-Shabaab also declared that Godane had died during the raid. While the Arabic tweet's authenticity is being analyzed, Godane does not appear in any social media or other public outlet to confirm that he is still alive. Experts suggest that his death would trigger a power struggle within the militant group to fill the leadership void, and may ultimately lead to its fragmentation.

==== 3 September ====
- Following a cabinet meeting, the federal government announces a 45-day ultimatum to Al-Shabaab members to surrender, disarm and renounce violence. According to the Minister of National Security Khalif Ahmed Ereg, any individual who ignores the directive will be held legally accountable. The cabinet also called on local Islamic scholars and society members to assist in convincing young militants to leave Al-Shabaab and join the peace process.
- The Hiran regional administration announced that Somali government forces assisted by AMISOM troops have driven Al-Shabaab completely out of the Hiran province. The allied forces are now slated to open the road between Beledweyne and Bulobarte. Additionally, they are marching towards the remaining areas under militant control, including Barawe where a number of Al-Shabaab commanders reportedly reside.

==== 5 September ====
- The Pentagon press secretariat Rear Adm. John Kirby confirms that Godane was killed in the U.S. airstrike. He describes the militant leader's death as a major symbolic and operational loss for Al-Shabaab, the result of years of intelligence, military and law enforcement work. President of Somalia Hassan Sheikh Mohamud states that all of Godane's companions were also killed during the operation, which he indicates was conducted with the full knowledge and consent of the Somali federal government. He also reiterates his administration's 45-day offer of amnesty to all moderate Al-Shabaab members who choose to renounce violence and disavow links with the insurgent group and its Al-Qaeda affiliate. Additionally, the Prime Minister of Somalia Abdiweli Sheikh Ahmed announces that the attack was targeting Godane's convoy near the town of Haawaay, and was an official joint operation between U.S. and Somali forces. He likewise asserts that the insurgent commander's death will help reconstruction and reconciliation efforts in Somalia to proceed unimpeded. Abdi Aynte, director of the Mogadishu-based Heritage Institute for Policy Studies, suggests that Godane's killing will likely mark the start of the end for Al-Shabaab. The Muslim scholars association in Somalia also issues a statement welcoming the progress made by the Somali National Army and AMISOM troops to eliminate the insurgent group.

==== 6 September ====
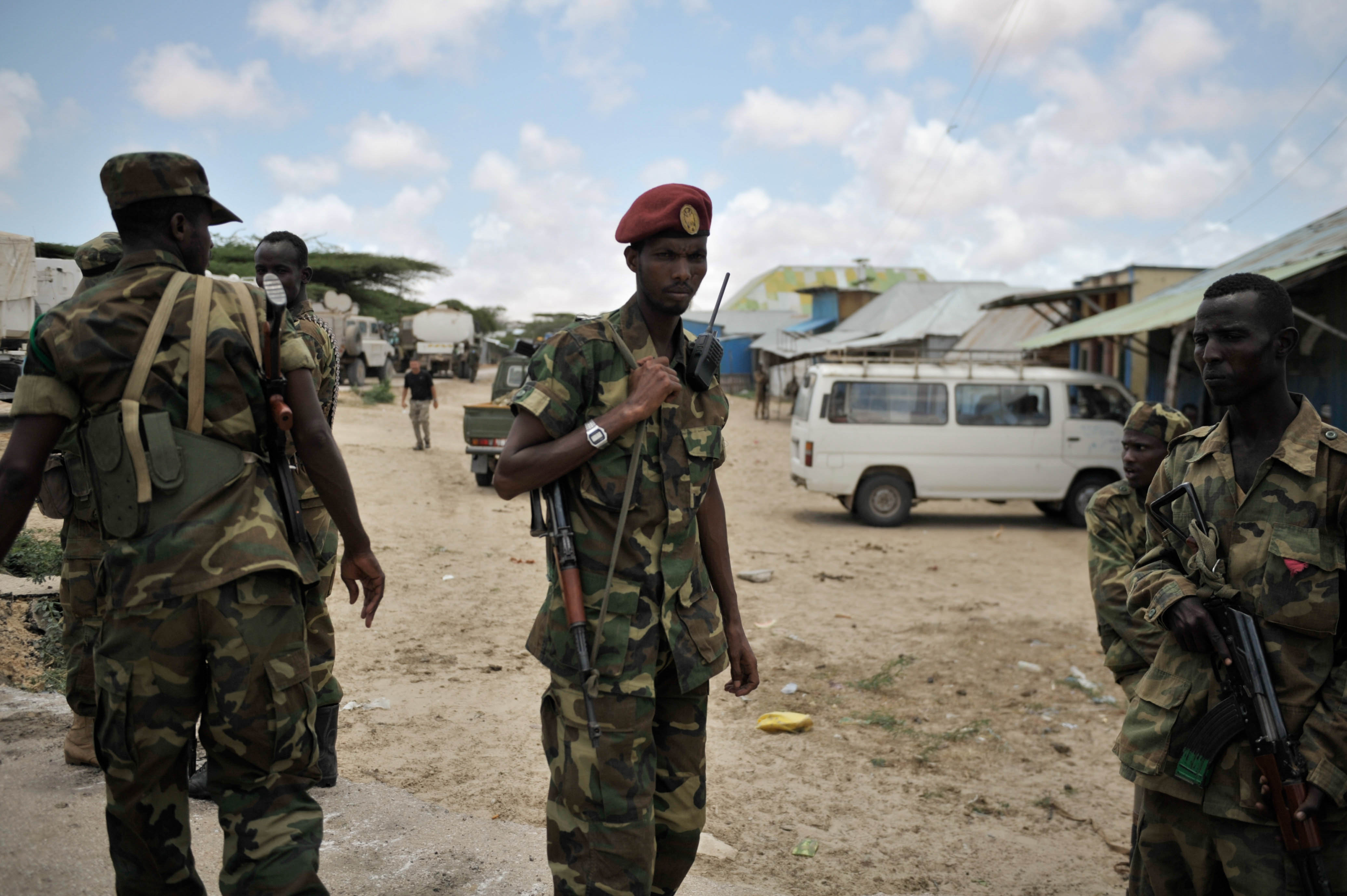
Somali Army soldiers during the operation

- The Ministry of National Security of Somalia issues a public warning of possible retaliatory attacks by Al-Shabaab insurgents for the killing of their leader Godane. The national security agencies are also reportedly placed on high alert to respond to any threats by the militant group.
- Somali government forces assisted by AMISOM troops capture some of the remaining villages in the Bakool region from Al-Shabaab. The seized areas include Biyeeleey, Sakaaroole and War-galoole in the Tiyeglow district. According to Col. Abdullahi Mohamed Ugaas, the battle lasted several hours, with at least ten insurgents killed. Al-Shabaab does not comment on the casualties. Ugaas also indicates that the allied forces impounded vehicles and weapons belonging to the militants.
- Al-Shabaab acknowledge that its leader Ahmed Abdi Godane has been killed in a joint U.S.-Somalia operation. The militants concurrently appoint Ahmad Umar (Abu Ubaidah) as his replacement.
- Somali government forces assisted by Ethiopian troops seize El Garas in the Galguduud province from Al-Shabaab. According to the Somali military spokesman Mohamed Kariye Roble, the village was a vital base for the insurgent group, serving as both a springboard from which it would launch attacks and a supply storage area.

==== 13 September ====
- Somali government forces and AMISOM troops capture Aboreey, Moqokori, Yasooman and Muuse-geel villages in the Bulobarte district from Al-Shabaab. The militants mount no resistance.
- Somali government forces and AMISOM troops seize Abooto-barrey, Ceel-Sheel, Carraale and Kaawada villages in the Galguduud province's El Bur district from Al-Shabaab.
- The French magazine Le Point reports that French intelligence services assisted the U.S. military in its airstrike that killed Al-Shabaab commander Godane. According to the weekly, the French authorities, including President François Hollande, provided support in the form of intelligence and coordination. Among other information, French intelligence officials reportedly forwarded to the Pentagon details as to which exact truck the militant leader was being transported in and on which road he was traveling. France reportedly holds Godane responsible for the abduction of two French intelligence agents in 2009, which ended in the execution of one of the officials, Denis Allex, after an unsuccessful rescue attempt by commandos in 2013.
- AMISOM forces conducted several targeted in-depth operations around the town of Badhadhe in Lower Juba region in a village called Lagta Berta targeting two camps where Al-Shabaab militiamen train. During the raid, Al-Shabaab suffered heavy losses, including many foreign fighters. Many Al-Shabaab militias were also wounded in the attack which completely destroyed the facility which was a hideout for the terrorists.

==== 27 September ====
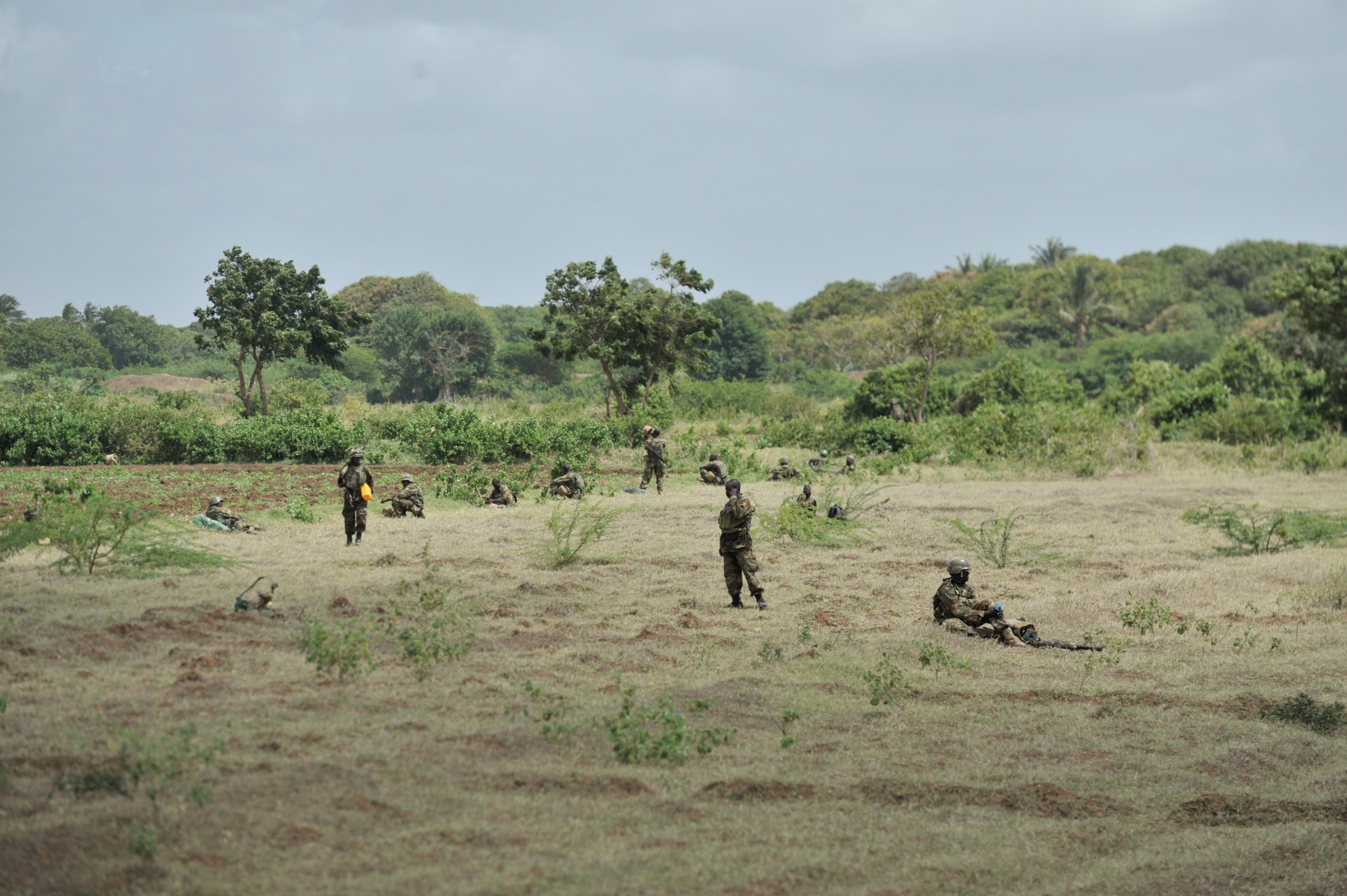
Ugandan troops set up a forward base after capturing an area from militants during the operation

- The National Intelligence and Security Agency (NISA) offers a $2 million reward to any individual who provides information leading to the arrest of the new Al-Shabaab leader, Ahmed Omar Abu Ubeyda. According to the NISA Commander Abdirahman Mohamed Turyare, a separate $1 million would be rewarded to any person who supplies information that could result in the killing of Ubeyda. Turyare also pledges that the informers' identities would be kept private. This is reportedly the first time that a Somali security official is offering such large dead-or-alive bounty on an Al-Shabaab leader.

==== 30 September ====
- Somali National Army forces and AMISOM troops capture Raage Ceele from Al-Shabaab. The strategic town is located around 100 km north of Mogadishu, in the Middle Shabelle region. The allied forces reportedly moved into the area after seizing Warshiikh, and encounter no resistance once they enter Raage Ceele.

=== October 2014 ===
==== 1 October ====
- Somali National Army forces assisted by AMISOM troops seize Maryan-Gubaay village, situated around 60 km from Barawe in Lower Shabelle. According to the province's Governor Abdukadir Nur Siidii, the raid is part of a major operation by the allied forces to secure the area. Federal security officials also estimate that around 500 Al-Shabaab fighters defected to the government since Operation Indian Ocean was launched in August of the year. The joint forces have captured all of the Bulo Marer district in Lower Shabelle, as well as new areas in the province's Barawe district. They are now reportedly heading toward Barawe, Al-Shabaab's largest remaining bastion.
- Somali government forces and AMISOM troops capture Adale from Al-Shabaab. The strategic town is located 222 km northeast of Mogadishu, and had served as one of two areas in the Middle Shabelle province from which the militants would launch attacks. The insurgents reportedly vacated Adale ahead of the raid, which is part of an intensified push by the joint forces against Al-Shabaab. According to residents, the troops entered the town from the direction of adjacent Haji Ali.

==== 2 October ====
- Kenyan AMISOM fighter jets launch airstrikes on Al-Shabaab bases near the Jilib district in the Middle Juba. Independent sources indicate that the attack has caused significant casualties among the militants. However, neither Al-Shabaab nor the Kenyan forces issue statements on the raid.

==== 3 October ====
- Al-Shabaab militants reportedly vacate Barawe ahead of a raid by Somali government forces and AMISOM troops. According to local residents, the insurgents began to depart from the town in the early morning and indicated that they would return and would decapitate anyone found assisting the joint forces. Barawe is situated 150 km from Mogadishu in the Lower Shabelle province, and was the insurgent group's largest remaining bastion.

==== 5 October ====
- Somali government officials announce that Somali military forces assisted by AMISOM troops have captured Barawe from Al-Shabaab. The port town is situated in the Lower Shabelle province, around 180 km (110 miles) south of Mogadishu. It was the militant group's largest remaining stronghold and served as a strategic hideout, revenue center, and training base for the outfit for the past several years. While many of the insurgents began vacating the area yesterday after getting word of the approaching joint forces, a number reportedly stayed behind to defend their positions. According to the Lower Shabelle Governor Abdulkadir Mohamed Nuur Sidii, Al-Shabaab sustained at least 13 fatalities in the ensuing battle, while two of the allied soldiers were wounded. The Somali military official Abdi Mire also confirms that the army is now in full control of Barawe. Most of the soldiers are garrisoned on the outskirts of the city, with a few stationed inside. Additionally, the Governor indicates that the situation is calm, and that the regional administration is slated to meet with local residents and traditional elders. Al-Shabaab military operations spokesman, Sheikh Abdiasis Abu Musab does not issue a statement with regard to the militants vacating Barawe. He instead asserts that the insurgents incinerated two government vehicles in an area close to the town, an ambush which the AU claims was unsuccessful.

==== 6 October ====
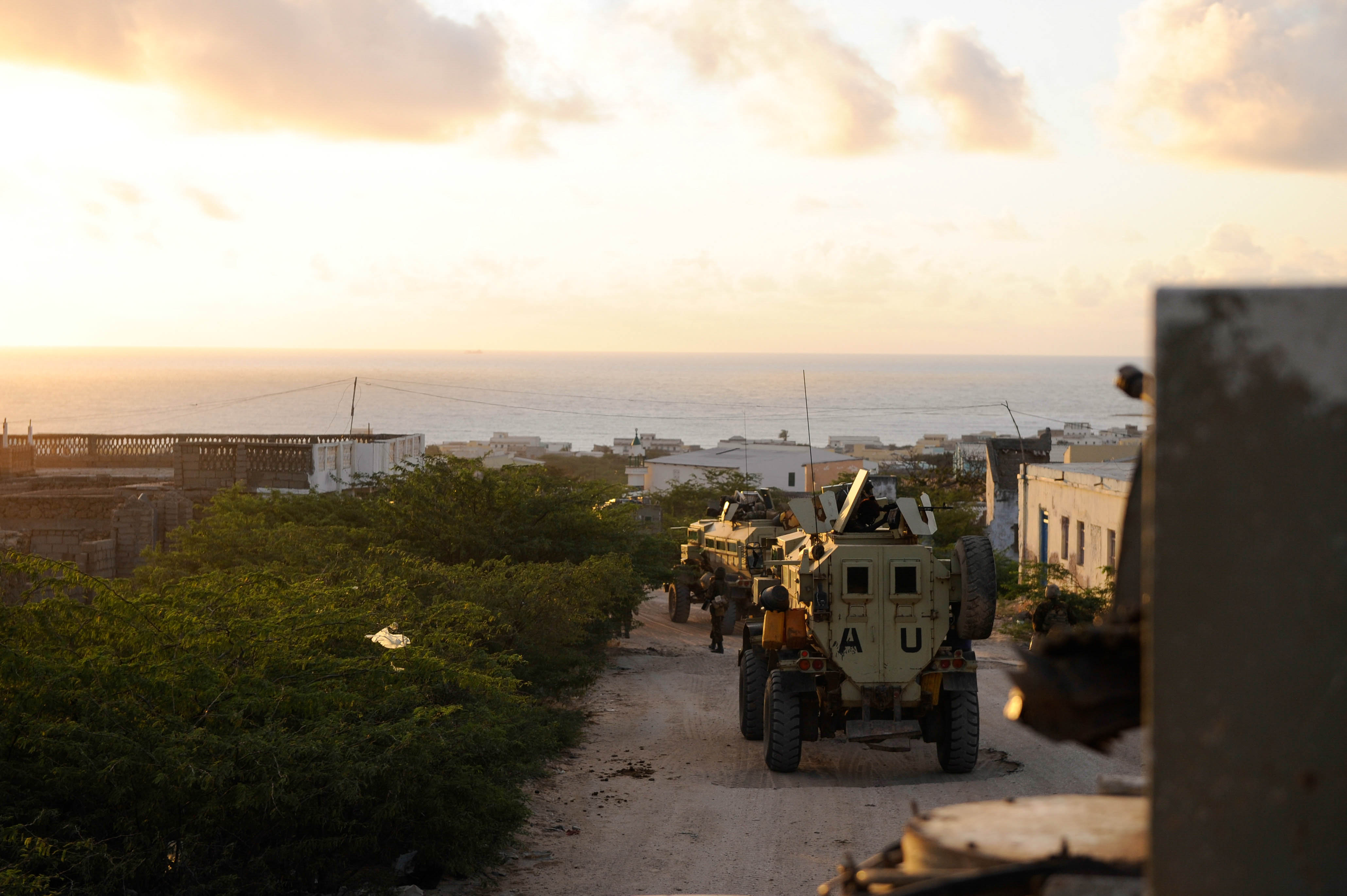
African Union enter Barawe amid minimal resistance by al-Shabaab fighters on 6 October

- Jubba Region's interim administration forces assisted by Kenyan AMISOM troops push Al-Shabaab out of Buulogudud and several other local areas. The village is situated 30 km west of Kismayo, the Lower Jubba province's capital. Al-Shabaab militants vacated the area without mounting any resistance. The attack and other raids against the insurgent group come after the conclusion of a reconciliation conference in Kismayo. Jubaland President Ahmed Madobe also issued a 48-hour ultimatum to the militants to surrender. Kenyan AMISOM spokesman David Obonyo indicates that 22 Al-Shabaab fighters were killed during the offensive, while three Somali National Army soldiers and one Kenyan soldier were wounded. He also says that the joint forces impounded weapons and ammunition and demolished three vehicles. Additionally, they have captured the Yoontoy and Koban localities. The allied forces are now heading toward the Jilib and Jamame districts and remaining areas nearby where Al-Shabaab maintains bases and training grounds. According to Jubaland spokesman Abdinasir Serar Mah, they are approaching Jilib, Bu'alle, Saakow and Salagle.

==== 8 October ====
- Jubaland forces and AMISOM troops seize Mugaanbow, Baar Sanguuni and Bangeenni in Lower Jubba from Al-Shabaab. Kenyan fighter jets also launch airstrikes during the raid, though the number of casualties are uncertain. According to Jubbaland commander Adan Gojar, the joint forces are now marching toward Kabsuma, situated 90 km north of Kismayo and Jilib. Although the militants have reportedly severed telecommunication lines in Jilib, allied forces are also nearing Jana Abdale.

==== 9 October ====
- Interim Jubba administration forces assisted by AMISOM launch cleanup operations in Hagar locality and other areas in the Lower Jubba province. According to officials, the aim is to secure local areas vacated by Al-Shabaab. Correspondents in the area report that allied forces clashed in some parts of the region with the militants. The joint forces are now marching toward Jilib district.

==== 23 October ====
- Al-Shabaab militants attack Somali government forces' positions in Sabiib near the Afgooye district. According to the village's governor Mayow Mayow, the government troops managed to successfully repelled the insurgents. Casualties are reported, but the exact number is unspecified. The area is calm the following day, with government forces in pursuit of Al-Shabaab remnants in the vicinity.

==== 24 October ====
- Interim Jubba Administration (IJA) forces capture Biroole in the Lower Jubba region from Al-Shabaab. The village is a key area, linking the Jubba Valley with the North Eastern Province. According to the IJA spokesman Abdinasir Serar, the Interim Jubba Administration forces slew four Al-Shabaab militants during the raid, but he did not report on the number of IJA casualties.

==== 25 October ====
- Interim Jubba Administration forces and AMISOM troops seize Kuda Island from Al-Shabaab. The island is located around 170 km from the Lower Jubba capital of Kismayo. According to IJA security officials, seven militants were killed in the skirmish, while two soldiers from the allied forces were slain and one was wounded. They have also indicated that they have impounded weapons and military vehicles. The joint forces are now reportedly carrying out local security operations. They are also set to march towards remaining Al-Shabaab bases in the Kulbiyow and Badhade localities.

==== 28 October ====
- The President of Somalia Hassan Sheikh Mohamud, the Special Representative of the Chairperson of the AU Commission for Somalia and Head of AMISOM Ambassador Maman S. Sidikou, State Minister for Defence Mohamed Ali Hagaa, Deputy Minister for Public Works and Reconstruction Mohamed Ismail Shurie, senior Somali National Army officers, and AMISOM military officials hold a press conference briefing the media on the progress of Operation Indian Ocean. Deputy Chief of the Defence Staff General Abdirisak provided a military campaign map and indicated that the mission focused on coastal areas where Al-Shabaab still had a foothold. The joint forces in the process captured eight strategic towns since the launch of the operation, with more about to fall. According to Sidikou, the southern port town of Koday was seized just 48 hours earlier by Somali forces who received surveillance and logistical support from their UN and AMISOM partners. The capture reportedly further prevents Al-Shabaab from entering, exiting and rearming themselves through seaport access. Additionally, Bula Haji and other small Lower Jubba villages have also been liberated. Sidikou also indicated that Al-Shabaab now only controls a few major towns in the south. Among these settlements are Jilib, Jamame, Buale and Sakow in the Middle Jubba province, Bardere in the Gedo province, and Diinsor in the Bay province, in addition to a few smaller towns such as El-Dere in the Middle Shabeelle province.
- Interim Jubba Administration forces and AMISOM troops reportedly capture Abdalla Biroole and other areas in the Lower Jubba province from Al-Shabaab. According to IJA spokesman Abdinasir Serar Maah, the joint forces in the process confiscated weapons and military vehicles from the insurgents. Kenyan AMISOM officials also indicated that they targeted Al-Shabaab hideouts and bases in the province, with airstrikes reportedly carried out. Casualty figures are uncertain. Additionally, Al-Shabaab did not issue a statement on the IJA raid.
- The President of Somalia Hassan Sheikh Mohamud offered an extra 60-day amnesty period to all Al-Shabaab fighters who renounce the militant group and its ideology. The offer comes immediately after the expiration of the government's initial 45-day amnesty window, during which over 700 insurgents have reportedly defected. The new amnesty period is valid from 1 November to 31 December.

==== 29 October ====
- Somali government forces assisted by Ethiopian AMISOM troops repel a night time raid by Al-Shabaab militants in the central town of El Garas. According to the national army spokesman Mohamed Kariye Roble, the allied forces killed three insurgents during the skirmish.
- Ahlu Sunna Waljama'a senior official Mohamed Yusuf Al-Qadhi announced that his group and Somali government forces aim to capture Bardhere district in the Gedo province from Al-Shabaab. The provincial capital of Bardhere is the militant group's last local bastion. Al-Qadhi adds that seizing the area will be facilitated by the small number of Al-Shabaab fighters left in the town. Additionally, he indicated that Somali government forces and Ahlu Sunna Waljama'a troops have already captured many other areas from the insurgents.

==== 30 October ====
- Somali government forces assisted by AMISOM troops seized new areas in the Galgaduud province from Al-Shabaab. According to the El-Garas administrator, the joint forces have now launched a security sweep in the captured territory. He also encouraged local residents in the area to assist as much as they can in the security efforts, and indicated that the allied forces will soon march towards the remaining areas in the region that are held by the insurgent group. Al-Shabaab does not issue a statement on the raid.

=== November 2014 ===
==== 5 November ====
- Interim Jubba Administration forces and AMISOM troops capture new areas in the Lower Juba province from Al-Shabaab. According to Col. Abdifatah Moalim Noor Salim, the joint forces seized weapons and apprehended several militants during the raid. He adds that they intend to drive the insurgents completely out of the province and bring the territory under the control of the IJA.

==== 8 November ====
- According to local residents, Al-Shabaab militants recaptured Kudhaa Island (Kuda Island) from Jubbaland forces and AMISOM troops. The insurgents who are heavily armed and attack Jubbaland military stations. The gunfight lasts three hours, with an estimated 23 fatalities. The advance of Jubbaland forces were reportedly hampered by potholes on the roads leading to the area which were caused by torrential rains.

==== 9 November ====
- Somali government forces kill several Al-Shabaab militants during a skirmish in Galgaduud. According to senior security official Mohamed Kaariye Arale, the joint forces are now heading toward the remaining areas in the province that are under insurgent control.

==== 10 November ====
- Kenyan warplanes launch airstrikes in some Lower Jubba localities, including Kuda Island. According to the Interim Jubba Administration security officials, the fighter jets were targeting specific local Al-Shabaab positions. They also assert that at least 60 militants were slain during the raid, among whom were senior commanders. Additionally, IJA representatives have vowed to recapture the area from the insurgent group.
- Al-Shabaab insurgents have vacated Kudhaa Island. The fighters are travelling in armoured vehicles, and have reportedly taken along with them an unspecified number of local residents. The departure immediately follows a pledge by Jubbaland spokesman Abdinasir Serar Mah, to recapture by force, the island from the militant group.

==== 12 November ====
- Somali government forces clash with Al-Shabaab militants at a security checkpoint in Maya Fulka. The gunfight lasts almost an hour. According to security officials, seven militants were killed during the skirmish.

==== 13 November ====
- Somali federal government forces and AMISOM troops attack Al-Shabaab hideouts near Goofgaduud Shabeelle in the Bay province. The vicinity is situated around 20 km from Baidoa. According to Somali National Army commander Mohamed Mohamud Nur, the joint forces killed two Al-Shabaab fighters during the raid, with one government soldier incurring wounds.

==== 19 November ====
- The Bulo-Burte administration announces that Somali government forces and AMISOM troops have captured the Yooman locality in the Hiran province from Al-Shabaab. According to the district commissioner Abdiaziz Duurow Abdi, the joint forces attacked the militant group's garrisons after receiving intelligence. He added that they are now in full control of the town and that the casualties include two soldiers and many insurgents. Al-Shabaab did not issue a statement on the raid.

=== December 2014 ===
==== 2 December ====
- Somali government forces and AMISOM troops seize El-Deer town in the Middle Shabeelle province from Al-Shabaab. Residents indicate that the locality was taken without any fighting. The insurgents also did not issue any statement on the raid. According to security officials, the capture of the town represents an important stage in the joint forces' effort to liberate southern and central areas from the militants.

==== 3 December ====
- Somali government forces and AMISOM troops launch a large security operation in Bulo-Burte district following mortar shelling on their bases in the area. According to the district commissioner Osman Gedi Elmi, the joint forces arrest an unspecified number of individuals during the early morning raid.
- Security officials and AMISOM representatives announce that police and intelligence service units successfully dismantled several Al-Shabaab terror cells that were operating in the capital. A few hours later, a suicide car bomber targeted an AMISOM convoy near the airport, ramming into one of the vehicles. Heavy gunfire ensues, and at least four people are killed. Al-Shabaab later claimed responsibility for the attack. Federal security agencies spokesman Qasim Ahmed Robleh concurrently held a press conference, where he indicated that the government forces managed to foil the attack before it reached its intended target. He also stated that the fatalities include a security official who died in the line of duty, and that the authorities are attempting to gauge the exact number of casualties. Additionally, Benadir administration spokesman Ali Seeko urged residents to cooperate with the policing agencies in order to help maintain security.

==== 15 December ====
- Somali government forces and Al-Shabaab clash in Tihsile on the outskirts of Afgooye district. According to a local resident, the gunfight began when the militants attacked the Lower Shabeelle locality. Casualties include four wounded and seven dead. Government forces are now in full control of the area with the situation on the ground stable.

==== 16 December ====
- Somali government forces and AMISOM troops conduct security operations in the Mogadishu and Lower Shabeelle vicinities, including the Kaxda district up to Elasha Biyaha area, Arbiska and Lafole. The sweep was prompted by gathered intelligence suggesting that Al-Shabaab was aiming to launch attacks in the capital from these locations. Seven militant suspects were in the process of being apprehended by the joint security forces. According to the Ministry of National Security spokesman Mohamed Yusuf Osman, more such cleanup operations are slated to be launched as part of the Stabilization plan.

==== 20 December ====
- The United Nations Security Council committee on Somalia removes former Al-Shabaab affiliate Mohamed Said Atom from its 1844 sanctions list. The decision came after Atom had, over the summer, defected from and renounced his allegiance to the militant group. According to Minister of Information Mustafa Duhulow, the announcement was prompted by lobbying done on the part of the Federal Government of Somalia, which had negotiated with UN officials and other member states to pardon individuals like Atom who have since disavowed extremist links.

==== 25 December ====
- An official, an Al-Shabaab spokesman, and a witness indicate that Al-Shabaab militants have attacked AMISOM's main Halane base in Mogadishu, prompting an exchange of gunfire with soldiers. The compound also serves as an office for local UN operations, with the airport, British and Italian embassies situated nearby. According to the insurgent group, its fighters were targeting a Christmas party inside the complex. AMISOM spokesman Col. Ali Aden Houmed indicated that at least eight militants entered the area. However, a Western diplomat within the compound stated that its walls were not penetrated. Mohamed Abdi, a policeman at the adjacent airport, also reported hearing explosions. Total casualties are uncertain. According to Houmed, five of the attackers were killed, with three gunned down and two blowing themselves up beside a fuel depot; the remaining three militants likely escaped. UN spokesman Aleem Siddique likewise stated that all UN personnel are safe. Additionally, roads leading to the airport have been sealed off. According to AMISOM, five of its troops, as well as one foreign contractor, were killed during the attack. Ambassador Maman Sidikou added that the attackers were wearing military fatigues and that access to the facility will hereafter be tightened. AMISOM spokesman Houmed later clarified that only two of the militants had absconded, but they were eventually besieged within the compound's underground holes that they had fled to. He likewise indicated that AMISOM troops are now in full control of the base, and that the authorities have launched a probe into the attack. Ministry of National Security spokesman Mohamed Yusuf announced a few hours later that government forces and AMISOM captured the four surviving Al-Shabaab militants who attacked the base.

==== 27 December ====
- A Somali intelligence officer indicates that senior Al-Shabaab commander, Zakariya Ismail Ahmed Hersi has surrendered to local police in the southwestern province of Gedo. According to the official, Hersi may have turned himself in after having fallen out, earlier in the year, with other Al-Shabaab members loyal to the group's late leader Godane.

==== 29 December ====
- Somali government forces assisted by AMISOM troops have captured a series of towns in the central Hiran province from Al-Shabaab. Among the liberated areas are Mirgab, Anfac, Burweyn, Hero Lugole, Rahale, Jar and Janbiley. According to Col. Mohamud Mohamed Qafow, the joint forces also aimed to deliver a supply convoy to Bulo Barde. Additionally, national army soldiers have been dispatched to Jalalaqsi in the Middle Shabeelle province to help the AU garrison.
- The U.S. Pentagon announces that its jets have conducted an airstrike targeting a senior Al-Shabaab commander in Somalia. Military spokesman Rear Admiral John Kirby did not specify the identity of the targeted insurgent leader, but indicated that the raid was carried out in the southern town of Sakow. He added that U.S. security personnel have not discerned any civilian casualties and that they are still gauging the strike's impact. Somalia's National Intelligence and Security Agency announced a few hours later that the raid killed Al-Shabaab intelligence chief Abdishakur (Tahlil). According to security officials, the slain militant leader was part of a unit that was tasked with carrying out suicide attacks. He had reportedly been assigned the position only a couple of days prior after his predecessor Zakariya Ahmed Ismail Hersi turned himself in to police in the southwestern Gedo region. The spy agency also indicates that two other Al-Shabaab insurgents were killed during the airstrike.

=== January 2015 ===
==== 1 January ====
- Somali government forces and Al-Shabaab militants have engaged in a gunfight near the southern town of Kurtun Waarey. Al-Shabaab commander Ibrahim Filey is killed during the skirmish in addition to three other insurgents.

==== 3 January ====
- Al-Shabaab insurgents attack a Somali military base on the outskirts of Baidoa. The militants briefly seized the station until they are eventually repelled. According to national military officer Ahmed Idow, three Al-Shabaab fighters were killed during the gunfight, while seven soldiers died. A spokesman for the insurgent group claimed instead that the militants killed 10 soldiers.

==== 5 January ====
- According to Interior Ministry spokesman Mohamed Yusuf, security forces are warned of a car laden with explosives in Mogadishu. The security officers trail the vehicle in question, which abruptly detonates near the Aden Adde International Airport. The car was reportedly targeting a convoy carrying soldiers of the Alpha Group intelligence unit. Officials indicate that four people were killed during the blast. Al-Shabaab spokesman Sheikh Abdul Aziz Abu Musab claimed responsibility for the explosion.

==== 7 January ====
- Al-Shabaab militants have executed four men in the Bardhere district by firing squad. The executions come after a Gedo regional court belonging to the insurgent group accused the individuals of spying for the Federal Government of Somalia, Ethiopia and the United States.

==== 8 January ====
- AU Special Representative to Somalia Ambassador Maman Sidikou announces that following joint military operations by Somali government forces and AMISOM troops, Al-Shabaab had lost control of over 80% of territory that it previously held. He indicated that the insurgents have now concentrated their capacity in the Lower Jubba province. Sidikou did not specify when exactly the cleanup operations against Al-Shabaab will conclude, however they are expected to be launched within a few weeks.

==== 13 January ====
- Somali government forces and AMISOM troops clash with Al-Shabaab militants for control of the Trako locality. The insurgent bastion is situated 50 kilometers west of the Bardhere district. According to local residents, the joint forces advanced into the area from Elwak district. The gunfight reportedly involved both light and heavy arms. Casualties are uncertain.

==== 17 January ====
- Security forces launch house to house searches and other safety measures in Mogadishu and it's environs. The stabilization operations are prompted by gathered intelligence indicating possible breaches of security. A number of Al-Shabaab suspects and illicit arms are in the process of being seized in the Kahda district. Following tips from residents, local police patrol specific areas in the Howlwadaag district, and detain suspects that were planning attacks, impounding their vehicles. Additionally, security forces discover a small bullet and explosive making factory in Heliwaa district. They subsequently apprehended five suspects and dismantled the weapons center.
- Luq District Police Commissioner Siyad Abdulkadir Mohamed announced that Sheikh Osman Sheikh Mohamed, the commander of Al-Shabaab's militia in the Luq area, has turned himself in to the federal authorities. The rebel leader likewise has reportedly handed over all of his weaponry. According to the police official, further Al-Shabaab members intend to defect. He also indicated that the federal government welcomes all former insurgents who disavow the use of violence and instead pledge to take part in the peace process.

==== 18 January ====
- Al-Shabaab militants and AMISOM forces engage in a gunfight in Arbaow. The skirmish begins after the insurgents attack AMISOM bases in the region at midnight, also firing rockets. According to a local resident, AMISOM troops in return inadvertently launch rockets into civilian areas. Casualties are uncertain.

==== 19 January ====
- Somali government forces and AMISOM troops launch a security operation in the Jalalaqsi district in the south-central Hiran province. According to the Jalalaqsi mayor Omar Osman Maow, they have in the process disarmed a number of residents that were causing disruption in the district. He also indicated that the joint forces arrested seven suspected Al-Shabaab militants during the raid.

==== 20 January ====
- The just appointed Mayor of Afgoye Ali Jalil dies in a landmine explosion targeting him near the Lower Shabeelle province's Hawa Abdi locality. Provincial Governor Abdikadir Mohamed Nuur indicates that Al-Shabaab militants were likely responsible for the killing as they previously targeted governmental and military officials stationed in the area, including himself. He also announced that the provincial administration has launched an investigation into the killing.

==== 24 January ====
- Somali government forces and AMISOM troops capture Bulo-Jadid, Bulo-Yusuf and El Jarmed villages in the Bakool province from Al-Shabaab. The insurgent group had for some time imposed a blockade on the three southwestern towns. According to Tiyeglow Mayor Mohamed Abdulle Hassan, the militants mounted little resistance to the advancing forces. Al-Shabaab did not issue a statement on the raid. The joint forces have vowed to continue their cleanup operations in the remaining central and southern areas that are under insurgent control.

==== 29 January ====
- Somali government forces engage Al-Shabaab militants near Garbaharay in the southwestern Gedo region. According to Somali National Army commander Abdullahi Mohamed Abshir, SNA soldiers therein apprehended two mid-level insurgent leaders. Gedo remains one of the last regions with a few districts still controlled by the militant group.
- The Interim Jubba Administration forces and AMISOM troops seize three small towns in the Lower Juba province from Al-Shabaab. According to IJA commander Mustaf Geedi, the joint forces killed many militants, whereas two allied soldiers sustained minor wounds. The raid is part of a larger cleanup operation by IJA forces in Jubbaland.
- Somali government forces, assisted by AMISOM troops, capture Janay Abdalla and Farwamo villages in the Middle Jubba province from Al-Shabaab. The joint forces have liberated Jubba river localities after brief skirmishes with the militants. No casualties have thus far been reported. Additionally, Al-Shabaab did not issue a statement on the raid.

==== 31 January ====
- Somali government forces engage Al-Shabaab militants on the outskirts of Beledweyne in the south-central Hiran region. According to the commander of the Somali National Army's 10th battalion Colonel Isak Idris, state troops killed a number of insurgents while sustaining some wounds. Total casualties are uncertain. Al-Shabaab did not issue a statement on the skirmish. Idris also indicated that they had flushed out the militants from the area.
- Governor of the Lower Shabeelle province Abdulkadir Mohamed Nur Sidi announces that an airstrike has struck an Al-Shabaab convoy and training base in the Dugaale village. According to Nur, a U.S. aircraft fired at least three missiles, targeting a fighting vehicle, a residence containing foreign fighters, and a militant installation where they were wrapping up a training course. He asserts that between 45 and 60 insurgents were in the process killed. Their training was also demolished. Additionally, a local resident reported that the area's inhabitants vacated the area upon hearing the loud explosion. Bay province official Ahmed Adan later specified that the airstrike was targeting a convoy of senior Al-Shabaab leaders near Dinsoor. According to Adan, two local residences as well as a militant training base were targeted. He also indicated that he has ground confirmation that a number of the group's fighters and one senior commander were killed during the aerial attack, which took place as the insurgents were travelling in their vehicles towards the training facility. The identity of the slain Al-Shabaab leader is not yet known. The Dinsoor locality is one of the last remaining urban areas under militant control. Pentagon Press Secretary Rear Admiral John Kirby later confirms that the U.S. Hellfire missile strike was targeting Al-Shabaab's chief of external operations and planning for intelligence and security, Yusuf Dheeq. He indicated that whether the militant leader was slain is being assessed and that there appears to be no civilian casualties. The Federal Government of Somalia subsequently issued a press statement officially confirming that Dheeq has been killed.

=== February 2015 ===
==== 1 February ====
- The Somali National Army commander in the Gedo province Jama Muse announces that government forces have captured a senior Al-Shabaab official. Muse does not specify the insurgent leader's identity. However, he indicates that the rebel commander was in charge of bomb making. The seizure comes seven days after President Hassan Sheikh Mohamud called for more militant defections.

==== 3 February ====
- Somali National Army troops apprehend Al-Shabaab commander Olow Barrow in the Middle Shabeelle province. Senior military official Mohamed Osman indicates that the insurgent leader had been injured during a skirmish near the Fidow locality. Barrow is to be transferred to Mogadishu for interrogation.

==== 8 February ====
- Al-Shabaab militants attack Puntland police at a security checkpoint in Boosaaso. According to Abshir Mohamed, head of security at the adjacent residence of deputy police commander Muhidin Ahmed in Bosaso, the insurgents drove up in a van and began shooting and hurling grenades at officers when their vehicle was stopped for inspection. He indicates that casualties include five injured and two dead policemen, as well as one slain militant. Al-Shabaab spokesman for military operations, Sheikh Abdiasis Abu Musab later confirmed responsibility for the raid.

==== 9 February ====
- Federal MP Abdullahi Qayat Barre is gunned down in Mogadishu's Hamar Jajab district as he is leaving his house. The shooting took place a few hours before the legislature is slated to vote for a new council of ministers. The Head of Parliament Secretariat Abdikarim Haji Buuh later confirmed that the lawmaker died from the wounds he had sustained. The gunmen are unknown.

==== 10 February ====
- Tiyeglow Mayor Mohamed Abdalla Hasan announces that Somali National Army forces and AMISOM troops have made significant territorial gains against Al-Shabaab and are advancing towards the insurgent group's last bastions in the Hudur region. The march aims to liberate the remaining parts of the Bakool area that the militants had cut off.

==== 12 February ====
- Somali government forces and AMISOM troops launch security operations in Jalalaqsi and it's environs. According to the local deputy district commissioner, Ibrahim Madoobe Noor, the joint forces are in pursuit of individuals believed to be causing unrest, and are slated to remove Al-Shabaab militants from the main trade routes that they blocked.

==== 16 February ====
- Somali National Army and Al-Shabaab militants engage in a gunfight in Jalalaqsi. According to the local district commissioner Omar Osman Ma'ow, the skirmish began after the insurgents attempted to seize control of the town from government forces. He indicates that the army troops managed to repel the militants. The official also asserted that casualties include three slain insurgents and one wounded soldier. Al-Shabaab did not issue a statement on the raid.

==== 17 February ====
- Gunmen kill prominent local businessman Haji Omar Mohamed Nur (Xaaji Qurow) in Beledweyne. According to the mayor, Nur was at the time renovating the district's office building. Beledweyne district governor, Mohamed Osman Abdi indicates that the entrepreneur's bodyguards are also slain. Witnesses have reported that the gunmen wore military fatigues. The perpetrators fled the scene before government forces arrived. Security personnel subsequently launched a probe into the shooting. Somali government forces assisted by AMISOM troops subsequently launched a large security sweep in Beledweyne. They are in the process of apprehending 50 individuals that are suspected of having been involved in Nur's murder. According to the local mayor Mohamed Osman, the suspects are now being held at the police station, where they are being interrogated. Residents also indicated that the raid is the largest door to door operation of its kind in months.

==== 18 February ====
- Government forces launch a security operation in the Bakool region, seizing two senior Al-Shabaab commanders. According to the Somali National Army head of operations in the region, Abdiladhif Mohamed Botan, the apprehended insurgent leaders are Sheikh Hassan Dhubow and Sheikh Abdi Barrow. Botan indicates that the pair are among the main operatives within Al-Shabaab and that state troops encountered heavy gunfire while attempting to capture them. Al-Shabaab did not issue a statement on the raid. Analysts have suggested that the security operation may represent a breakthrough, which significantly hinders the functioning of local militant cells.
- Somali National Intelligence and Security Agency (NISA) special forces launch a security operation in Mogadishu. According to Ministry of National Security spokesman Mohamed Yussuf, the soldiers were deployed at night at various road junctions in the capital, and subsequently began searching and tracking vehicles which were transporting security guards with illegal arms at dawn. The official also indicated that the operation will be conducted throughout the city to ensure peace.
- Somali National Army forces assisted by AMISOM troops launch a large security sweep in villages in the Buula burde district. According to local SNA commander Abdullahi Elmi Barre, the operations aim to buffer up on security and apprehend militants and bandits hiding in the area. The joint forces in the process captured dozens of Al-Shabaab suspects, whom the army official indicated will be tried following a probe. The sweep comes in the wake of a pledge by the district administration to eliminate insurgents who were impeding transportation on the road.

==== 19 February ====
A Kenyan airstrike in Somalia killed at least 52 suspected militants from the Al-Shabaab, including its intelligence chief, according to the Kenyan military. But Al-Shabaab denied that there was any strike, and a Somali government official cast doubt on the intelligence chief's death.

==== 20 February ====
- Al-Shabaab militants launch a surprise attack on the Central Hotel in Mogadishu, when a vehicle laden with explosives smashes into the compound's gate. Gunmen then penetrated the premises and open fire in the hotel mosque. Police Major Nur Mohamed indicates that a suicide bomber also blew himself up within the complex. 20 people have been reportedly killed in the attack, including the local deputy mayor and a legislator, according to the government. The Minister of Information Mohamed Hayir Maareeye states that Deputy Prime Minister Mohamed Omar Arte and other federal ministers were at the time holed up in the compound but survived the raid. An Al-Shabaab spokesman later claimed responsibility for the attack, indicating that the militants had targeted the officials during prayer time as retribution for "apostasy". Security subsequently cordoned off the area around the hotel.

==== 24 February ====
- Somali government forces assisted by AMISOM troops carry out a security operation in the vicinity of Mahas town. According to the local district commissioner, Mohamed Muumin Sanay, the sweep was successful, with the joint forces killing an Al-Shabaab tax collection leader, after an exchange of gunfire. He added that the troops are also pursuing other militants in the area. Al-Shabaab does not issue a statement on the raid. The security sweep was part of a larger cleanup operation in the Hiraan region.

==== 26 February ====
- Police announce that unknown attackers have launched several mortars that have landed near the presidential palace in Mogadishu. Al-Shabaab militants have claimed responsibility for the shelling, and assert that the mortar rounds landed inside the compound. Casualties if any, are uncertain. According to officer Ali Hussein, police have launched a probe to find out who the perpetrators were.

=== March 2015 ===
==== 1 March ====
- Somali National Army forces and Al-Shabaab militants engage in a skirmish in El Bur district. According to SNA Colonel Mohamed Arale, government troops have managed to secure the area. He also indicated that the army forces and AMISOM troops, with intelligence assistance provided by the general public, are in the final stages of flushing out the insurgents.

==== 4 March ====
- Somali National Army forces, assisted by AMISOM troops, launch a sweep in El Bur district against Al-Shabaab. According to local SNA commander Mohamud Mohamed, the security crackdown is prompted by complaints from residents. He also indicated that the joint forces have apprehended several suspected insurgents and are in pursuit of the remaining ones in the area. Additionally, the Buur-Hakaba district administration announced that state forces have launched a manhunt for other militants who put up illicit roadblocks in the Bay region.

==== 7 March ====
- The Dhusamareeb administration announces that Al-Shabaab landmine expert, Abdullahi Mohamed "Madoobe" has surrendered to government forces stationed in the town. According to the local district commissioner, Abdirahman Ali Mohamed "Geeda-Qorow" and police commander Abdullahi Garar, the bomb specialist is now under their protective custody. Garar indicates that Mohamed also previously trained as a bodyguard. At a press conference, Mohamed concurrently renounced ties with Al-Shabaab, denounced its ideology, and urged young fighters within the militant group to follow suit and defect.
- The Federal Government of Somalia announces that it will deploy drones in its military operations against Al-Shabaab. According to the Ministry of Security spokesperson Mohamed Yusuf Osman, the Somali National Army is prepared to use the unmanned aerial vehicles separately from AMISOM. However, he did not specify the quantity or provenance of the equipment. The drones will be used to target the insurgent group's remaining bases and installations that remain in the countryside.

==== 8 March ====
- The US government officially removes Al-Shabaab defector Zakaria Ismail Hersi ("Zaki") from its Rewards for Justice list. The decision was reached after negotiations between the Somali federal government and US authorities, which concluded that Zaki had met the conditions unambiguously, establishing that he is no longer associated with the militant group. This in turn comes after the former insurgent commander had publicly disavowed ties to Al-Shabaab, renounced violence, and fully took part in the post conflict reconstruction and reconciliation process. The federal government also used the opportunity to reiterate its offer of amnesty to all Al-Shabaab leaders and fighters who follow suit and join the peace process.

==== 10 March ====
- Somali government forces attack an Al-Shabaab custom duty in Masjid Ali Gudud. The village is situated in the Middle Shabeelle province, a few kilometers away from Adale. According to a Somali National Army commander, the raid was scheduled, but he did not specify whether state troops seized control of the militant base. Three insurgents were killed.
- Somali government forces apprehend four foreign Al-Shabaab recruits attempting to sneak into the militant group's bases in Dhobley in the Lower Jubba region. According to the local Somali National Army commander Haybe Ahmed Abdullahi, the captured fighters included two Kenyans and two Tanzanians, who were holding documents indicating that they were headed towards Al-Shabaab held areas. Two Somali insurgents were also apprehended.

==== 11 March ====
- Somali Armed Forces launch door to door search operations in residential areas in Beledweyne. The security sweep comes a week after the murder of a local elder, Ahmed Adan Siyar, one of several assassinated traditional elders and politicians. The military, police and other forces are also patrolling the town's main streets.

==== 12 March ====
- Al-Shabaab militants attack the official residence and headquarters of South West State President Sharif Hassan Sheikh Adan in Baidoa. According to witnesses, the skirmish began when insurgents blew up a vehicle outside the house, which then ignited a gunfight with security forces. Regional police commissioner Colonel Mahad Abdirahman reports that eight of the insurgents were killed, as well as three Somali government soldiers and one soldier serving in the Ethiopian AMISOM contingent. Three individuals were also injured, but Aden was unharmed. Pro Al-Shabaab websites subsequently claimed responsibility for the raid. The Minister for Security of the South West State Abdifatah Geesey later announced that his administration had received a tip that a vehicle containing a bomb was attempting to make its way to the regional presidential palace. The explosives went off just as the security forces reached the car. A public tip off subsequently led the police to one of the attackers who was hiding out in the local ADC grocery store. The man was then apprehended and taken to the central police station for questioning.
- Somali government forces and AMISOM troops engage in a skirmish with Al-Shabaab militants in a village between El Bur and Dhusamareb in the south-central Galgudud region. The gunfight began when insurgents attempted to waylay an allied convoy carrying inmates from El Bur. According to a senior Somali National army officer stationed in Dhusamareb, the joint forces subsequently repelled the insurgents. Casualties are uncertain. The state forces and AMISOM troops also indicate that they incinerated an Al-Shabaab battle wagon.
- Somali National Army officials based in the southwestern Gedo region announce that SNA and AMISOM troops are advancing towards Al-Shabaab's base in Bardhere. According to SNA Col. Khalif Nur Hirey, seizing Bardhere will greatly facilitate the capture of the last remaining insurgent held areas.
- A US drone strike near Abu Halul reportedly kills two senior Al-Shabaab commanders. The militants were traveling in a vehicle on the outskirts of the village, which is situated between Bardhere and Dinsoor. The identity of the two insurgent leaders is uncertain as they were both incinerated in the blast. However, one of the men is believed to have been Aden Garaar, the head of external operations of Al-Shabaab. No party has claimed responsibility for the airstrike. Additionally, neither the Somali federal government nor Al-Shabaab has issued a statement on the raid. Unnamed U.S. officials later confirmed that Garaar was targeted and killed in the airstrike, which was carried out by a unmanned Predator aerial vehicle using Hellfire missiles. The slain militant commander had reportedly orchestrated the 2013 Westgate shopping mall attack in Nairobi. The Pentagon subsequently also confirms that Garaar had been killed in the airstrike.

==== 13 March ====
- Somali National Army forces and Al-Shabaab militants engage in a skirmish on the perimeter of Bur Dubo. The rebels reportedly attacked a Somali military convoy as it was moving towards the Gedo region. According to army officials, the state forces managed to repel the insurgents during the armed attack, which lasted several hours. Military officer Osman Nuh Haji indicated that army soldiers in the process killed three Al-Shabaab members, including local commander Mohamed Musa. The militant group did not issue a statement on the raid.

==== 14 March ====
- Somali government forces engage in a skirmish with Al-Shabaab fighters on the outskirts of Jalalaqsi. According to Somali National Army Col. Omar Hassan Omar, the state troops managed to defeat the rebels, killing seven militants and wounding 15 others. He added that the gunfight began when insurgents attacked the area. Al-Shabaab did not issue a statement on the raid.
- National Intelligence and Security Agency spokesperson Qasim Ahmed Roble, announced that Somali government forces have captured four suspected Al-Shabaab insurgents. The men reportedly shot at state forces during a security sweep in Mogadishu the day before. According to Roble, one of the suspects was in his early 60s, whereas the average Al-Shabaab members tend to be young males.

==== 15 March ====
- Interim Jubba Administration forces launch a large security operation in Kismayo and environs. According to the local commander, the sweep is meant to strengthen safety in the IJA's administrative capital. An unspecified number of Al-Shabaab militants were concurrently arrested. Additionally, security forces are in control of the flow of passenger and vehicle traffic as they patrol the city's roads.

==== 20 March ====
- Somali National Army forces and AMISOM troops are attacked by Al-Shabaab fighters as they were marching toward the militant group's base in Bardhere. The joint forces managed to repel the insurgents. According to SNA commander in Bur Dubo town Osman Noah Haji, the SNA and AMISOM troops are likely to easily capture Bardhere since the militant group's strength had been sapped following successive battle losses and assassinations of several of its key leaders by US unmanned aerial vehicles. He added that the forces aimed to seize the remaining areas under insurgent control as soon as possible.

==== 21 March ====
- Somali National Army forces and AMISOM troops launch a security sweep in the Bulo Burde district to clear an Al-Shabaab blockade in the area. The cleanup operation commenced in Beledweyne, with the joint forces removing militants from settlements on both sides of the main road leading towards the district center. Casualties include around five SNA troops and one AMISOM soldier. Local officials did not issue a statement pending arrival at Bulo Burde.

==== 22 March ====
- Interim Jubba Administration forces assisted by AMISOM troops recapture Kudha Island from Al-Shabaab. The strategic Lower Shabeelle province island had been under insurgent control for a few months. The joint forces were approaching the area over the past 24 hours. According to a Jubbaland forces commander, the militants vacated the island before their arrival. No fighting or casualties were reported. The raid is part of a broader security sweep by IJA and AMISOM forces in the Jubba region, with the aim of seizing the remaining areas held by the insurgents.

==== 24 March ====
- According to local residents, AMISOM troops vacate Awdhegle and Bariire villages at night. The forces reportedly leave in convoys, taking their fixed heavy equipment with them. No reason for the withdrawal was provided. The two Lower Shabeelle localities had been liberated by Somali National Army and AMISOM forces, with SNA troops still stationed in the towns.
- Somali National Army forces and AMISOM troops launch a large security sweep in Jowhar. The government forces consist of SNA, security and police officials, who conduct door to door inspections over several hours in Hanti Wadaad and other suburbs in the town. The troops also control vehicular and pedestrian traffic. According to the commander of government forces in the Middle Shabeelle province Abdiweli Ibrahim, the operation aims to strengthen local security. It was the first such sweep in the area by state forces since Al-Shabaab militants were evicted from the area.

==== 26 March ====
- Interim Jubba Administration forces and AMISOM troops deploy soldiers against Al-Shabaab in Kulbiyow and other new fronts in the Lower Shabeelle province. Since losing Kudha Island, the militants have been hiding out in the Badamadow forest area. According to local commissioner Mohamed Ismail, the joint forces are aiming to dislodge the insurgents from Kulbiyow and other parts of the countryside.

==== 29 March ====
- A remote controlled bomb targets an AMISOM convoy in the Merca suburbs. AMISOM troops subsequently open fire, killing two pedestrians. No one is apprehended for the attack, as AMISOM forces are reportedly in pursuit of the attackers. AMISOM also does not specify the number of casualties, nor does it issue a statement on the bomb attempt.

==== 30 March ====
- Senior Al-Shabaab officer Bashaan Ali Hassan ("Mohamed Ali") turns himself in to Somali National Army officials in Hudur. According to local residents, the militant leader had served in the insurgent group's Bakool and Lower Shabeelle province contingents. SNA commander in Bakool Abdirahman Mohamed Osman "Tima-Adde" indicates that the government forces are conducting a probe to ascertain the circumstances surrounding Hassan's surrender. He also hails the defection as a major setback for Al-Shabaab and its leadership.

=== April 2015 ===
==== 6 April ====
- Kenyan jets launch airstrikes against two Al-Shabaab bases in the southwestern Gedo province of Somalia. According to the Kenya Defence Forces spokesman David Obonyo, the warplanes have demolished the camps. Al-Shabaab military operations spokesman Sheikh Abdiasis Abu Musab denies that the bases are struck, and asserts that the missiles instead hit farmland.
- A Somali military court sentences to death two suspected Al-Shabaab operatives, Shucayb Ibrahim Mahdi (aged 27) and Farah Ali Abdi (aged 30). The men are accused of having assassinated several federal legislators, including Saado Ali Warsame, Adan Mohamed Ali (Sheikh Adan Madeer), and Mohamed Mahamud Hayd, as well as security officer Ahmed Odawaa. According to the court's chairman Hassan Ali Shuute, the alleged militants are to be executed by firing squad.

==== 7 April ====
- Government forces launch a major security operation in Jalalaqsi in the Hiran province. The sweep is prompted by intelligence received by the Somali National Army and AMISOM. According to SNA commander Omar Mohamed Kunteenar, the government forces have in the process apprehended five key Al-Shabaab suspects, two of whom are carrying weapons. He adds that the security forces are honing in on several other suspects, and are scheduled to dismantle sleeping militant cells operating in the district.

==== 10 April ====
- The Federal Government of Somalia offers a $250,000 reward for the capture of Al-Shabaab commander Ahmed Diriye. It also places bounties of between $100,000 and $150,000 for information on the whereabouts or leading to the arrest of several other of the militant group's leaders, including Mahad Warsame Galay (Mahad Karate), Ali Mohamed Raage (Ali Dhere), Abdullahi Abdi (Daud Suheyb), Mohamed Mohamud Noor "Sultan", Ali Mohamed Hussein (Ali Jeesto), Mohamed Mohamud (Gama-Dhere), Hassan Mohamed Afgoye, Mohamed Abdi Muse Mohamed, Yasin Osman Kilwa and Abdullahi Osman. Additionally, the federal government indicates that any leads forwarded to it vis-a-vis the wanted insurgent commanders will be kept strictly confidential.

==== 11 April ====
- Police apprehend nine suspected Al-Shabaab insurgents in Bakara market in Mogadishu and in Kismayo. The security forces had been trailing the suspects for almost a month. While the police do not specify the identities of the alleged militants, they assert that the individuals were senior Al-Shabaab insurgents. According to Security Ministry spokesman Mohamed Yusuf, the suspects were found hiding in two hotels in the Mogadishu market and in a hotel in Kismayo. The police subsequently close down the hotels for assisting criminal elements. Yusuf also indicates that hotel owners in the capital were warned that their establishments would be shut down and they would be charged under the law if they employ or give succor to purported Al-Shabaab members.
- Suspected Al-Shabaab militants attack the residence of Lower Shabelle province Governor Abdikadir Mohamed Noor "Sidii". According to the official, the skirmish began after his bodyguards finished patrolling at midnight. He indicates that the gunmen were led by a commander from Morocco, and that they arrived from Fon-Buraale village, situated between Kuntuwaaray and Qoryooley. The governor also asserts that casualties include five Al-Shabaab insurgents, one of his security detail, five wounded bodyguards, and seven injured militants. Additionally, he outlines his administration's counterinsurgency operations, and indicates that the majority of Al-Shabaab leaders stationed in the province have been killed.

==== 15 April ====
- The Somali military court in Mogadishu sentences 7 suspected Al-Shabaab members to 10 years imprisonment. The men are alleged to have ties with the group, including providing its militants with protection and hiding places as well as offering intelligence. A military court spokesman also indicates that the suspects may appeal the verdict once it is announced.

==== 18 April ====
- Somali government forces and AMISOM troops launch a security sweep in Bullo-Burde and environs. According to local commanders, the cleanup operation is aimed at firming up on security in the area. It comes after Al-Shabaab militants blockaded the primary commercial routes between Bullo-Burde, Jalalaqsi and other towns in the Hiran province. Arrests if any are unspecified. The sweep is among several broader security maneuvers by the joint forces.

==== 19 April ====
- Al-Shabaab insurgents attack Kenyan AMISOM troops in the southern Delbio area of Somalia. The insurgents reportedly shoot at the Kenyan soldiers' vehicle, with an exchange in gunfire ensuing. AMISOM fatalities include three dead troops. Officials indicate that eight wounded AMISOM soldiers are also being transported to Nairobi for treatment. The militants reportedly retreat into the forest.

==== 22 April ====
- Somali government forces AMISOM troops launch a large security sweep in the Bullo-Burde area. According to local army commander Mohamed Ibrahim Baakay, the operation is aimed at tightening safety in the broader district, which has already considerably improved. He also indicates that 20 Al-Shabaab suspects have been arrested, and that the authorities are slated to probe the security situation shortly.

==== 30 April ====
- Somali government forces and Al-Shabaab militants engage in a skirmish in Hudur district. According to the deputy district commissioner for security affairs Adan Abdi Abaaray, the state troops manage to flush out the insurgents from Mooragabay locality and environs. He also indicates that the government forces are now marching toward the remaining insurgent held areas situated at a 10 km radius from Hudur town.

=== May 2015 ===
==== 2 May ====
- A military court tries several Al-Shabaab suspects, sentencing alleged member Ahmed Aweys to death. Another suspected militant Abdi Ibrahim Mohamed is sentenced to 10 years imprisonment, and a third individual constable Mahat Ahmed is acquitted in absentia. Among the charges were membership in Al-Shabaab, and harboring, protecting and offering information to the insurgents. According to the spokesman for the military court, more hearings of Al-Shabaab suspects are scheduled in the offing.

==== 3 May ====
- Somali National Army, security and police forces as well as AMISOM troops launch a large security sweep in Mogadishu. The house-to-house search operation is conducted in Howlwadag and Warta-Nabadda, among other districts. According to Ministry of Security spokesman Mohamed Yussuf Osman, the sweep is intended to quell anti-peace elements in the area. He indicates that the security forces subsequently arrest dozens of Al-Shabaab suspects, whose culpability will be adjudicated. The official also urges residents to cooperate with the security forces.

==== 7 May ====
- Somali government forces assisted by AMISOM troops launch a security sweep in the Wadajir district in Mogadishu. The operation is district-wide, with soldiers carrying out house-to-house searches in pursuit of anti-peace elements. Several dozen youths are apprehended in connection with the killing of the district's deputy commissioner the day prior. According to the Wadajir district commissioner, the security situation is stable. He also urges residents to cooperate with the forces, and indicates that the security personnel are on guard to quell any threats to safety in the area.
- Somali government forces and Al-Shabaab militants engage in a skirmish in the Bulla-Burde district in Hiran province. According to local commander Colonel Abdirahman Abdi Mumin, the state troops launched an attack on Aboorey in order to expel insurgents from the area. The locality is situated around 47 km to the east of the town of Bulla-Burde. Mumin also indicates that fatalities include two Al-Shabaab fighters in addition to several wounded militants, with government troops sustaining few casualties. Al-Shabaab does not issue a statement on the raid. Additionally, the army commander vows to root out the remaining insurgents. SNA commander Colonel Abdullahi Barre Elmi later confirms that the government forces have seized the locality from Al-Shabaab.

==== 8 May ====
- Somali government forces and Al-Shabaab militants engage in a skirmish in the Hudur district. According to the local deputy district commissioner for security affairs Adan Abdi Abaaray, the state troops have captured the area from the insurgents. He indicates that they killed several of the anti-peace elements. The official also announces that the government forces are now heading toward other areas in the district to flush out the remaining militants.

==== 11 May ====
- Somali government forces and Al-Shabaab militants engage in a skirmish in Qasah-dhere. According to the Qasah-dhere district commissioner Adan Abdi, the fighting begins after the insurgents attack soldiers garrisoned in the town. The shootout lasts several hours, causing some infrastructural damage. Casualties include at least five individuals. The district official indicates that the Somali National Army troops manage to repel the insurgents. Al-Shabaab does not issue a statement on the raid.
- Unknown gunmen shoot immigration department officer Abdullahi Mohamed Osoble from a vehicle stationed in Mogadishu's Hodan district. According to eyewitnesses, the shooters had snuck into the Siigaale neighborhood, where they launched their attack prior to the arrival of police. An individual close to the official indicates that he was rushed to the Madina Hospital, where he was treated for minor injuries. National Intelligence and Security Agency forces subsequently launch a door-to-door search operation in the Taleh, African-Village and Al-Baraka areas where the culprits are believed to be hiding, and arrest several suspects. Al-Shabaab later claims responsibility for the attack.
- Somali National Army forces and Djibouti AMISOM troops seize Burweyn from Al-Shabaab. The locality is situated around 28 km to the south of the town of Bulla-Burde. According to Section 10 SNA commander in the Hiraan province Osman Abdi Mumin, army forces capture the area following a brief skirmish with the militants. He also indicates that the soldiers have apprehended three suspected Al-Shabaab insurgents. The militant group does not issue a statement on the raid.

==== 12 May ====
- Somali government forces and AMISOM troops launch a large security sweep in Baladwein. According to the Hiran province police commissioner Isack Ali Abdullahi, the operations are aimed at strengthening safety in the broader district during a local reconciliation conference. Soldiers are stationed on the main roads and are inspecting vehicles and pedestrians. The commissioner indicates that the security forces have arrested a number of Al-Shabaab suspects, who are slated to be interrogated. He also urges residents to cooperate with the state troops.

==== 15 May ====
- Al-Shabaab militants launch attacks against government garrisons in Aw-Dhegle and Makaraan, situated 75 km west of Mogadishu. The heavily armed insurgents recapture both towns from the state troops during the skirmish, which lasts several hours. Casualties occur on both sides, with dozens of fighters, soldiers and civilians wounded. Al-Shabaab radio claims that its militants killed at least ten government troops and impounded battle wagons and ammunition. According to Lower Shabelle Governor Abdulkadir Mohamed Noor, government forces have been deployed to re-seize the area. Two hours later, Somali military forces recapture the towns from the insurgents.

==== 23 May ====
- Al-Shabaab fighters attack Somali government forces garrisoned in Aw-Dhegle and Mubarak towns. According to Aw-Dheegle district commissioner Mohamed Aweys Abukar, the army troops manage to repel the insurgents after several hours of gunfire exchange. He also indicates that casualties total 26 militants and 19 soldiers, with some fighters also wounded. Al-Shabaab claims responsibility for the raid and asserts that its militants killed 25 soldiers.
- Somali government forces and AMISOM troops launch a large security sweep in Mahas. According to local commander Mohamed Mumin Saney, the forces apprehended several Al-Shabaab suspects, who he indicates would be interrogated. He also urges residents to cooperate with the security forces. The operation is part of a broader security sweep in the district.

== See also ==
- 2014 timeline of the War in Somalia
- 2015 timeline of the War in Somalia
