= Ahmed Moalim Fiqi =

Somali politician

Ahmed Moallim Fiqi
- Axmed Macallin Fiqi أحمد معلم الفقهي
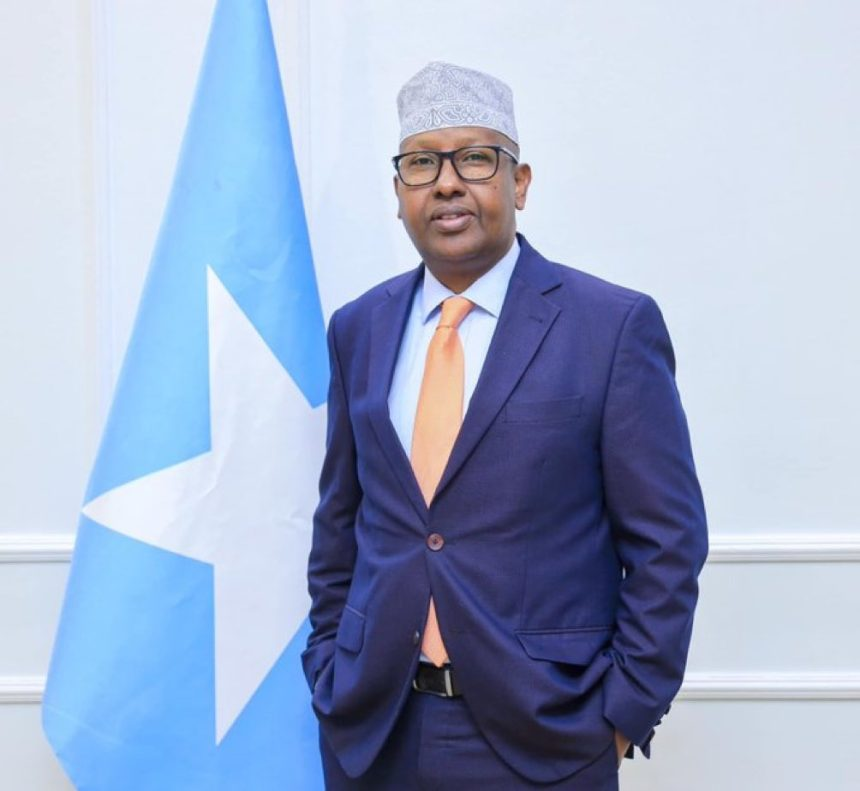
- Official portrait

Minister of Defence of Somalia
- Incumbent
- Assumed office 27 April 2025
- Prime Minister: Hamza Abdi Barre
- Preceded by: Abdulkadir Mohamed Nur

Minister of Foreign Affairs of Somalia
- In office 7 April 2024 – 27 April 2025
- Prime Minister: Hamza Abdi Barre
- Preceded by: Abshir Omar Huruse
- Succeeded by: Abdisalam Abdi Ali

Minister of Internal Security of Galmudug
- In office 24 April 2020 – 7 October 2021
- President: Ahmed Abdi Kariye
- Preceded by: Saadaq Sheekh Yuusuf

Secretary‑General of Forum for National Parties
- In office October 2019 – 23 May 2020
- Succeeded by: Abdirahman Mohamed Husen

Secretary‑General of Union for Peace and Development Party
- In office 4 October 2018 – 23 May 2020
- Succeeded by: Abdirahman Mohamed Husen

Member of Somali Federal Parliament
- Incumbent
- Assumed office 27 December 2016

Secretary‑General of Daljir Party
- In office September 2015 – 4 October 2018
- Preceded by: Hasan Haji

Director of Somali National Intelligence and Security Agency
- In office 24 May 2011 – 25 March 2013
- President: Sharif Sheikh Ahmed; Hassan Sheikh Mohamud
- Preceded by: Mohamed Warsame Darwish
- Succeeded by: Abdikarin Dahir

Ambassador of Somalia to Sudan
- In office 2010 – 24 May 2011
- President: Sharif Sheikh Ahmed

Personal details
- Born: 1971 (age 54–55) Galkacyo, Somalia
- Party: Union for Peace and Development Party

Ahmed Moallim Fiqi (Somali: Axmed Macallin Fiqi, Arabic: أحمد معلم الفقهي) is a politician from Somalia who currently serves as defense minister and has served as foreign minister from 2024 to 2025. Formerly a member of the Islamic Courts Union, Fiqi is currently a member of the Somali Federal Parliament. From May 2011 to March 2013, he served as Director of the National Intelligence and Security Agency (NISA). After resigning from the position, he was provisionally replaced by Abdikarin Dahir.

In 2015, Ahmed Moallim Fiqi ran for the office of President of Galmudug State. Ahmed lost to his contender Abdikarim Hussein Guled. Guled won by 49 to 40 votes over former Intel. Chief Ahmed Moallim Fiqi.

== Early life and education ==
Fiqi was born in 1971 in Galkayo, Somalia, His family hailed from the Sa'ad Habargidir clan. Fiqi took his primary and secondary school in Mogadishu. In 1988, after his two-year Military service he was admitted to the College of Law at the Somali National University. Fiqi didn't complete his studies due to the Somali Civil War. He then went to Sudan and studied agriculture at the University of Khartoum.

== Political career ==
Ahmed Fiqi started his political career during the Islamic Courts Union. He was very close friend of former ICU leader Sharif Sheikh Ahmed. Later when Sharif Sheikh Ahmed become president, Fiqi served as the Somali ambassador to Sudan from 2010 to 2011. He served as Director General of the National Intelligence and Security Agency and Presidential Candidate for the Galmudug State of Somalia.

In early 2015, Ahmed Fiqi co-founded Daljir Party with Sharif Sheikh Ahmed and Hassan Moalim. Later Ahmed Fiqi ran for the office of President of Galmudug State. He lost to his contender Abdikarim Hussein Guled. Guled won by 49 to 40 votes over former Intelligence Chief Ambassador Ahmed Moallim Fiqi.

On 28 November 2016, Ahmed Moalim Fiqi was elected as member of the Federal Parliament of Somalia from Galmudug in Adado, Somalia.

Fiqi's Daljir Party formed a coalition with former Somali President Hassan Mohamud's Peace and Development Party. They launched Union for Peace and Development Party in October 2018.

Fiqi has been a prominent and sometimes polarizing figure in Somali politics. During his tenure as Minister of Interior (2022–2024), he played a central role in federal-state relations and reconciliation processes, including engagements with federal member states such as Puntland. His approach drew both support and criticism from political stakeholders.

In 2024, he was appointed Minister of Foreign Affairs and International Cooperation, where he oversaw Somalia’s diplomatic engagement at the United Nations, including its successful bid for a non-permanent seat on the UN Security Council. He also took a firm position on regional issues, including Somalia’s response to Ethiopia’s memorandum of understanding with Somaliland.

Fiqi’s frequent reassignment across key ministries has been widely noted in Somali political discourse. Analysts have described his appointments as reflecting his perceived reliability within the executive, particularly by President Hassan Sheikh Mohamud. At the same time, critics argue that repeated redeployments may point to shifting political alignments and raise questions about continuity within government institutions.

=== Foreign minister (2024–2025) ===
On 7 April 2024, Fiqi was appointed Minister of Foreign Affairs of Somalia.

Political offices
Preceded by Abshir Omar Huruse	Minister of Foreign Affairs of Somalia; 2024–2025	Succeeded by Abdisalam Abdi Ali
