= Abdirahman Yusuf Hussein Aynte =

Somali politician

Abdirahman Yusuf Ali Aynte
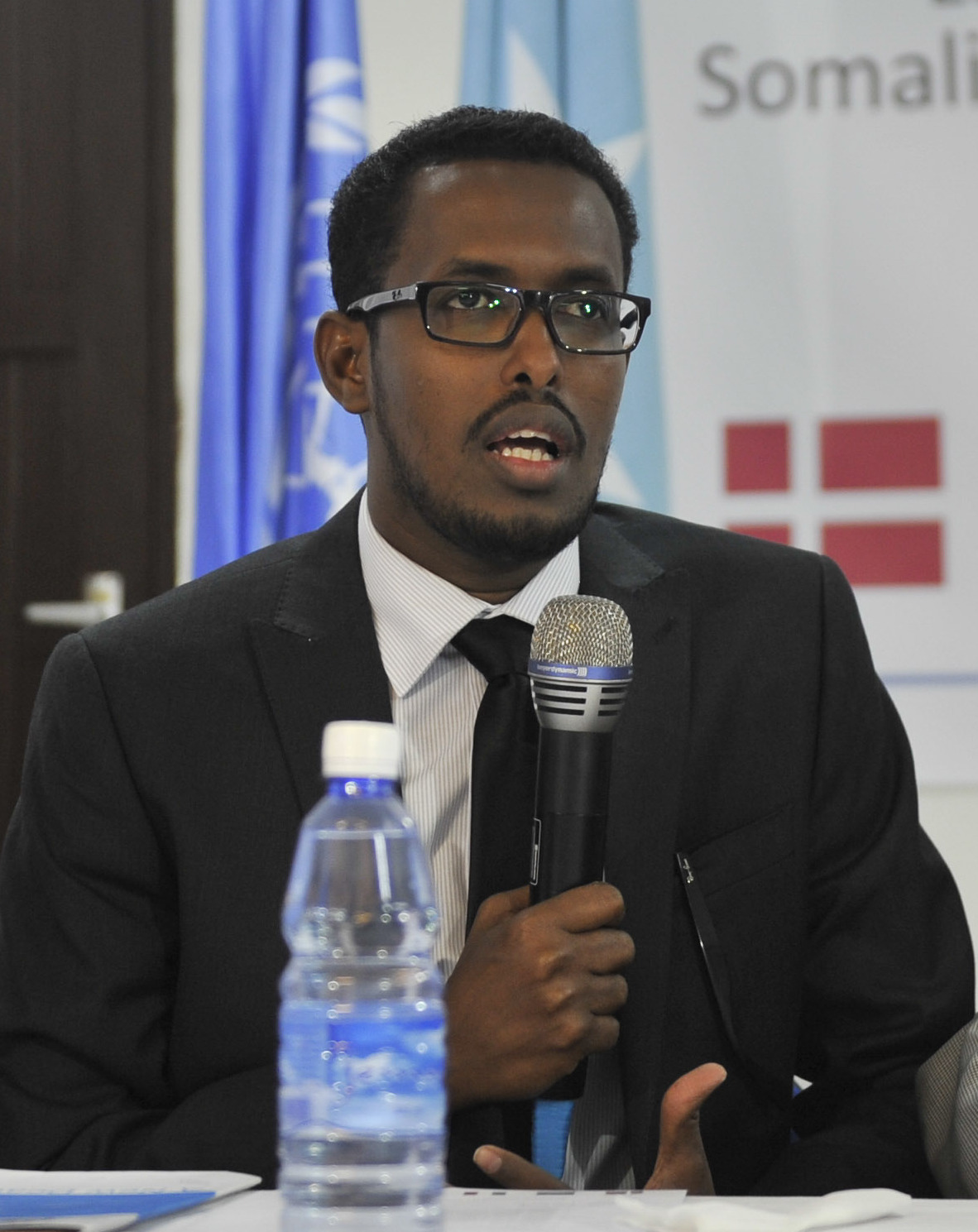

Minister of Planning and Economic promotion

Minister
- In office 27 January 2015 – 4 April 2017
- President: Hassan Sheikh Mohamud
- Prime Minister: Omar Abdirashid Ali Sharmarke
- Preceded by: Said Abdullahi Dani
- Succeeded by: Gamal Mohamed Hassan

Personal details
- Born: April 23, 1985 age 39 Mogadishu, Somalia
- Party: Independent
- Children: 5
- Education: Johns Hopkins University
- Occupation: Politician/Journalist/Academic

Abdirahman Yusuf Ali Aynte is a Somali politician and journalist. He previously worked for the BBC, VOA and Al Jazeera English. He was the former Minister of Planning and International Cooperation of Somalia, having been appointed to the position on 27 January 2015 by the then Prime Minister Omar Abdirashid Ali Sharmarke. He held that position until April 2017.

Between April–October 2017, Aynte was a Senior Advisor to the President of Somalia, H.E. Mohamed Abdullahi Farmaajo Among other tasks, he was responsible for planning and delivering the International London Conference on Somalia in May 2017. Aynte also helped President Farmaajo on policies and procedures governing Official Development Assistance (ODA).

In November 2017, Aynte joined the United Nations as Director of Policy Planning and Strategy based in the Middle East.

During his tenure as Minister, Aynte was credited with overseeing the drafting of Somalia's first National Development Plan (NDP), a three-year comprehensive economic recovery blueprint. The NDP came after exhaustive consultations with Federal Member States, civil society and the private sector. It was approved by the Federal Member States, and was subsequently endorsed at the historic London Conference on Somalia in May 2017. Aynte was widely praised for successfully ending the New Deal Compact for Somalia, and replacing it with the NDP—a Somali-led, Somali-drafted document.

Aynte has also been credited with the release of the first Population Estimate Survey (PES) in Somalia in 30 years. Although the PES sparked national controversy because it released figures for Somalia's 18 administrative regions, it was widely welcomed as the first reliable data on population. Aynte was considered one of the most accomplished ministers during the Sharmarke Premiership.

In his capacity as the Minister of International Cooperation, MAynte forged a very close relationship with traditional (western) and non-traditional donors, bringing them together on a common platform. He also nudged them to align their support behind Somalia's new National Development Plan and gradually phase out the New Deal Compact for Somalia.

Since February 2017 Mr Aynte has been a Senior Advisor to the new President of Somalia, Mohamed Abdullahi Farmaajo. Aynte was handling international and development portfolios. He was the chief organizer of the Presidential Inauguration Ceremony on 22 February. Later he was the head of delivery team of the London Conference on Somalia in May 2017. The London Conference on Somalia brought together over 43 countries and international organizations, and was considered a major success.

Before joining the Somali government, Aynte was the founder and Executive Director of the Heritage Institute for Policy Studies (HIPS), the first think tank in Somalia. During that period, Aynte regularly appeared on local and international media. He also frequently spoke at international platforms and even testified before the U.S. Senate on Somalia.

Before founding HIPS, Aynte was a journalist and editor for over 10 years. For nearly four years, he was a Senior News Editor at Al Jazeera English, and also reported for the BBC and the VOA.

Aynte holds M.A. in Government and International Studies from the Johns Hopkins University in Washington DC, and a B.A. in Journalism and Political Science from the Metropolitan State University in St. Paul, Minnesota.

Aynte is the son of Yusuf Ali Aynte, a scholar of Islamic Studies and author. The Senior Aynte was also a former Member of Somalia's Parliament and continues to be a prominent civil society leader in Mogadishu.
