= Bashir Goobe =

Somali politician and military officer

Lieutenant General Bashir Goobe
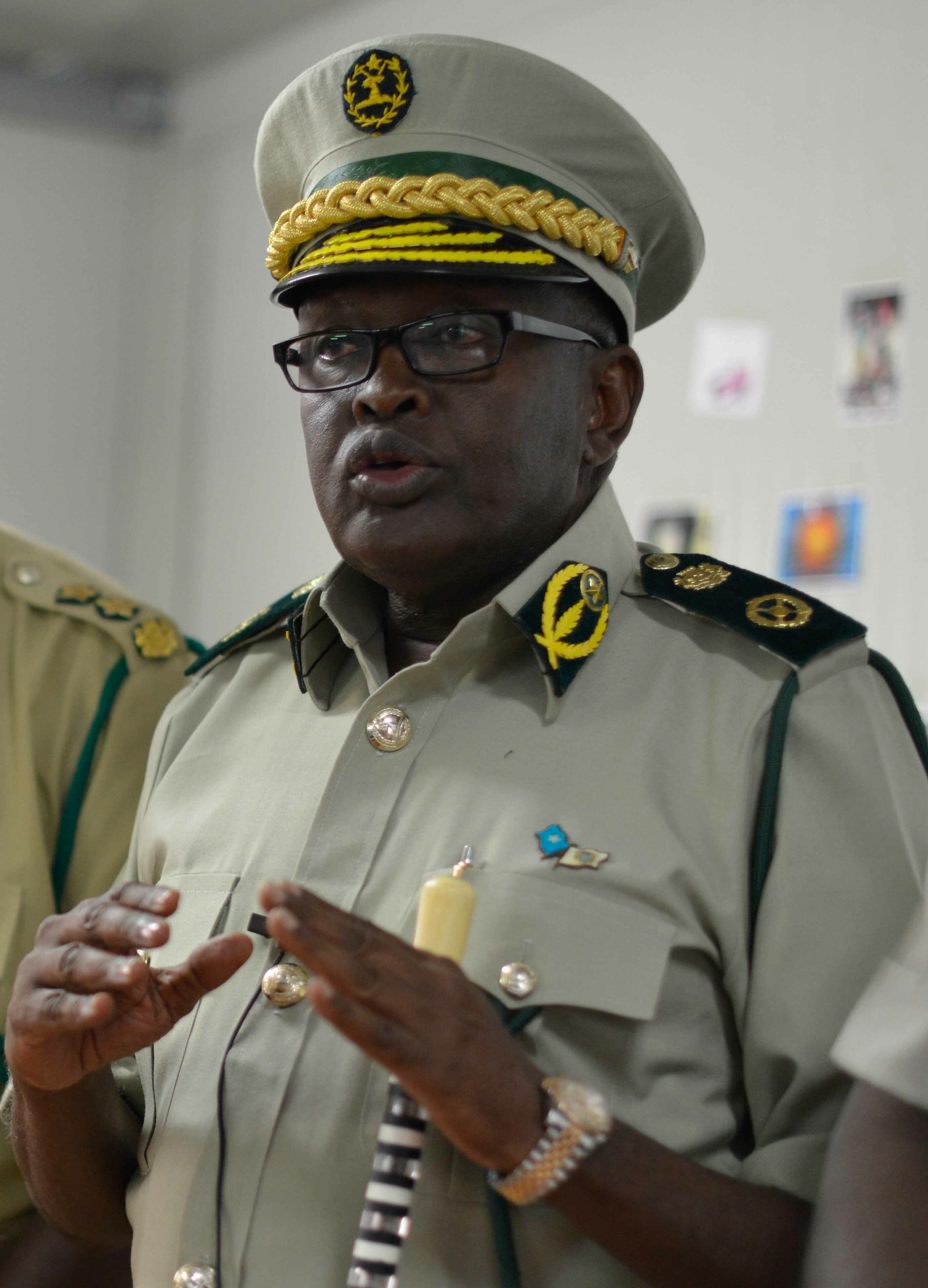
- Jama in 2015

Director-General of the Somali Agency for Construction and Development
- Incumbent
- Assumed office 26 August 2019
- Prime Minister: Hassan Ali Kheyre

Chief of the Somali Custodial Corps
- In office 19 February 2018 – 22 August 2019
- Prime Minister: Hassan Ali Kheyre
- Preceded by: Hussein Hassan Osman
- Succeeded by: Mahad Abdirahman Aden

Director of the National Intelligence and Security Agency
- In office 8 May 2013 – 9 July 2014
- Prime Minister: Abdi Farah Shirdon; Abdiweli Sheikh Ahmed
- Preceded by: Abdikarin Dahir
- Succeeded by: Abdullahi Mohamed Ali

Personal details
- Born: Bashir Mohamed Jama Goobe بشير محمد جامع

Military service
- Allegiance: Somalia
- Branch/service: Somali Police Force *(Custodial Corps)
- Years of service: 1975–91; 2000–13
- Rank: Lieutenant General

Bashir Mohamed Jama Goobe (Somali: Bashiir Maxamed Jama Keynan Goobe, Arabic: بشير محمد جامع) is a politician and former Somali Armed Forces officer. He is currently the Director-General of the Somali Agency for Construction and Development. He served twice as the Chief of the Somali Custodial Corps and also served as the Director of the National Intelligence and Security Agency from 2013 to 2014. He received the highest rank of Lieutenant General and served as the only Lieutenant General since the former Prime Minister Mohamed Ali Samatar retired in 1991.

== Career ==
Bashir Jama Goobe hails from the horogle sub-clan of Madhibaan

He served in Somali Police since 1975 until 1991, and from 2000 until 2013. Before that, he was the Director of the Somali Ministry of Interior before serving as Deputy Minister of Somali Social Development.

Beginning in August 2012, he began serving as an MP in the House of the People or Lower House of the Federal Parliament of Somalia.

In May 2013, Goobe was appointed the new Director of the National Intelligence and Security Agency (NISA) in place of Abdikarin Dahir.

On 9 July 2014, following a security reform, Goobe was replaced as intelligence chief with Abdullahi Mohamed Ali.

In September 2021, Prime Minister Mohamed Hussein Roble re-appointed Goobe as Director General of NISA.
