= Liban Ali Yarrow =

Liban Ali Yarrow لبنان علي يارو

Chief of the Supreme Military Court of Somalia
- Incumbent
- Assumed office 24 September 2014
- Prime Minister: Abdiweli Sheikh Ahmed
- Preceded by: Abdurahman Mohamud Turyare
- In office 18 February 2014 – 18 May 2014
- Prime Minister: Abdiweli Sheikh Ahmed
- Preceded by: Hassan Mohamed Hussein Mungab
- Succeeded by: Abdurahman Mohamud Turyare

Liban Ali Yarrow (Somali: Liibaan Cali Yarrow, Arabic: لبنان علي يارو) is a jurist and military leader from Somalia. He is the Chief of the Supreme Military Court.

== Career ==
On 18 February 2014, Yarrow was appointed interim Chief of the Supreme Military Court of Somalia by presidential decree. He succeeded Hassan Mohamed Hussein Mungab at the position, who had earlier been appointed Governor of the Banaadir region and Mayor of Mogadishu. Yarrow's transitional term ended on 18 May 2014, when Abdurahman Mohamud Turyare was named the new Military Court Chief.

On 24 September 2014, Yarrow was reappointed Chief of the Supreme Military Court, after Turyare was named the new head of the National Intelligence and Security Agency (NISA).
