= Abdullahi Sanbaloolshe =

Somali politician (born 1968)

- عبد الله محمد علي
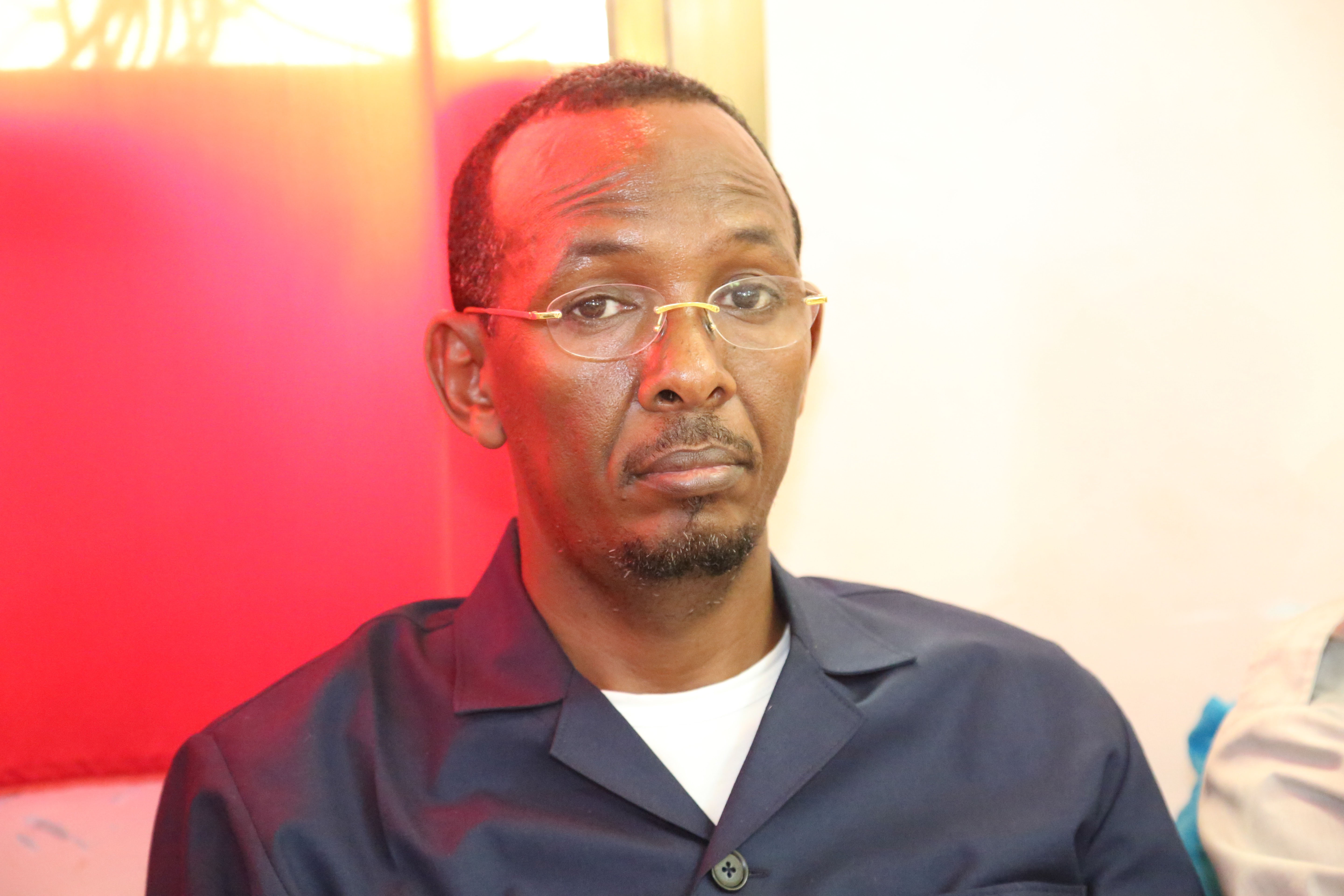
- 1968 (age 57–58)

Former Director of the National Intelligence and Security Agency
- In office 4 April 2024 – 31 May 2025
- Appointed by: Hassan Sheikh Mohamud
- Preceded by: Abdullahi Gafow Mohamud (acting)
- In office 6 April 2017 – 27 October 2017
- Appointed by: Mohamed Abdullahi Farmaajo
- In office 10 July 2014 – 7 September 2016
- Appointed by: Hassan Sheikh Mohamud
- Preceded by: Bashir Mohamed Jama
- Succeeded by: Abdurahman Mohamud Turyare

Personal details
- Born: Abdullahi Mohamed Ali Sanbalolshe Buloburde
- Nickname: Sanbaloolshe

Abdullahi Mohamed Ali Sanbalolshe (Somali: Cabdulaahi Maxamed Cali Sanbaloolshe, Arabic: عبد الله محمد علي) is a Somali politician and incumbent Director of the National Intelligence and Security Agency. He previously served as the director of the National Intelligence and Security Agency in 2014. Again in April 2017, Ali Sanbalolshe was reappointed as the director of NISA.

He is currently a member of the federal parliament of Somalia.

Ali Sanbaloolshe is from the Ali-Madaxweyne (Hassan Muse) Hawadle subclan of the Hawiye.

== Career ==
He was previously the Minister for National Security in the Transitional Federal Government. Ali Sanbaloolshe later served as Somalia's Ambassador to the United Kingdom.

On 9 July 2014, following a security reform, Ali Sanbaloolshe was appointed the new Director of the National Intelligence and Security Agency (NISA). He replaced Bashir Mohamed Jama at the position.

On 7 September 2014, the Federal Cabinet sacked Ali as NISA Director. He was replaced at the position by Abdurahman Mohamud Turyare, the former Chief of the Supreme Military Court.

He won his second term as a member of the Federal Parliament of Somalia in March 2022 after receiving 54 votes in Beledweyne.

On 4 April 2024, he was appointed by the Council of Ministers of the Federal Republic of Somalia as Director of the National Security and Intelligence Agency (NISA) for the third time. He served in the position until 31 May 2025, when he was replaced.
