= Abdikarin Dahir =

Abdikarin Dahir عبد الكريم ضاهر

Director of the National Intelligence and Security Agency
- In office March 2013 – May 2013
- Prime Minister: Abdi Farah Shirdon
- Preceded by: Ahmed Moalim Fiqi
- Succeeded by: Bashir Mohamed Jama

Abdikarin Dahir (Somali: Cabdikariin Daahir, Arabic: عبد الكريم طاهر) is a politician from Somalia. From March 2013 to May 2013, he served as the interim Director of the National Intelligence and Security Agency (NISA).
