= Hassan Moalim =

Somali politician

Hassan Moalim was formally a member of the federal parliament of the Somali Federal Republic serving two terms and is currently a Minister of Constitution and Justice under President Hassan Sheikh Mohamud.

== Early life ==
Hassan Moalim was born in Mogadish in the 1970s. He is also the current chairman and prospective presidential candidate of Daljir Party.
