= Buq Gosar =

Buq Gosar Buq Goosaar
- Town
- Location in Somalia
- Coordinates: 04°30′39″N 44°48′59″E
- Country: Somalia
- State: Hirshabelle
- Region: Hiran
- District: Buq goosar District

Population (2017)
  - Total: 12,000
- Time zone: UTC+3 (EAT)

Buq Gosar (Somali: Buq Koosaar) is a town in Hiran Region .

== Overview ==
Buq Gosar located at 48 km (30 mi) West of Baladweyn City
