= Abdurahman Mohamud Turyare =

Somali jurist and military leader (born 1970)

General Abdirahman Mohamud Turyare عبد الرحمن محمود طوريارآ

Director of the National Intelligence and Security Agency of Somalia
- In office 22 September 2014 – 14 June 2016
- Prime Minister: Abdiweli Sheikh Ahmed
- Preceded by: Abdullahi Mohamed Ali
- Succeeded by: Abdullahi Gafow Mohamud (acting)

Chief of the Supreme Military Court of Somalia
- In office 18 May 2014 – 22 September 2014
- Prime Minister: Abdiweli Sheikh Ahmed
- Preceded by: Liban Ali Yarrow
- Succeeded by: Liban Ali Yarrow

Personal details
- Born: December 29, 1970 (age 55)

Abdirahman Mohamud Turyare (Somali: Cabdiraxmaan Maxamuud Tuuryare, Arabic: عبد الرحمن محمود طوريارآ) is a Somali jurist and military leader. He previously served as the Director of the National Intelligence and Security Agency of Somalia, and as the Chief of the Supreme Military Court.

== Personal life ==
Turyare earned a master's degree in international law. He is also presently a candidate for a PhD in law.

== Career ==
Turyare previously served as head/incharge of investigations at the National Security Agency headquarters in Mogadishu.

=== Chief of the Supreme Military Court ===
On 18 May 2014, Turyare was appointed the new Chief of the Supreme Military Court of Somalia by presidential decree. He succeeded the interim Chief Liban Ali Yarrow.

=== Commander of the National Intelligence and Security Agency ===
Turyare's term as Military Court Chief ended on 22 September 2014, when the Federal Cabinet appointed him as the new head of the National Intelligence and Security Agency (NISA). He replaced Abdullahi Mohamed Ali, who had been sacked earlier in the month. According to the Council of Ministers, the NISA position was also concurrently renamed from "Director" to "Commander".

In September 2014, the Turyare offered a $2 million reward to any individual who provides information leading to the arrest of the new Al-Shabaab leader, Ahmed Omar Abu Ubeyda. According to the NISA Commander, a separate $1 million would be rewarded to any person who supplies information that could result in the killing of Ubeyda. Turyare also pledged that the informers' identities would be kept private. This is reportedly the first time that a Somalia security official is offering such large dead-or-alive bounties on an Al-Shabaab leader.
