= City University of Mogadishu =

University in Mogadishu, Somalia

- Type: Private
- Established: 2012
- Location: Mogadishu, Somalia; 2°01′55.3″N 45°18′44″E
- Website: cu.edu.so

City University of Mogadishu (CU) is a private, not-for-profit university located in Mogadishu, Somalia.

== History ==
City University of Mogadishu was established in 2012.

== Academic programs ==
The university offers undergraduate and graduate programs across its colleges:

College of Humanities and Social Sciences

- A Political Science – International Relations
- BA Political Science – Public Administration
- MA Political Science – International Relations
- BA Law
- BA English Language

College of Agriculture and Natural Resources

- BS Agriculture – Agronomy (Soil & Environmental Sciences)
- BS Marine Sciences – Fisheries & Aquatic Sciences
- BS Animal Science and Industry

College of Engineering and Computing

- BS Civil and Infrastructure Engineering
- BS Computer Sciences
- BS Information Technology – Cybersecurity

College of Business and Administrative Sciences

- BBA Business Administration – Accounting
- BS Economics
- MBA – Business Administration and Entrepreneurship

College of Health and Human Services

- BS Public Health
- Bachelor of Social Work (Mental Health Concentration)

== Campus and facilities ==
The campus includes lecture halls, a library, and laboratories.
