= Heritage Institute for Policy Studies =

Think tank based in Mogadishu, Somalia

- Formation: 2013
- Founded: 2013
- Type: Political institute
- Location: Mogadishu, Somalia
- Key people: Director Mursal Saney
- Website: heritageinstitute.org

The Heritage Institute for Policy Studies (HIPS) is a think tank based in Mogadishu, Somalia.

== Overview ==
The Heritage Institute for Policy Studies is an independent, nonprofit, nonpartisan research center which aims to inform and influence public policy and practice through field-based research, informed analysis and innovative solutions in the form of reports, policy briefs and public debates.

Established in Mogadishu, Somalia in January 2013, the HIPS has begun writing reports and policy papers to advise the nascent Somali government, international organizations, and other local actors. In its first six months, HIPS has provided commentary and guidance on topics as diverse as educational opportunities in Somalia, displaced nationals, and domestic diplomatic initiatives in Kismayo and the self-declared state of Somaliland. Notable speakers include Asha Haji Elmi, Mohamed Nur "Tarzan" and Mohamed Ali Ameriko.

As part of its mission, the HIPS will also promote a culture of learning and research in Somalia. It aims to do so by launching a series of public libraries across the country, organizing summer book fairs and offering research courses and fellowships to postgraduate students and aspiring researchers.

HIPS is headed by Mursal Saney.
