= Ahmed Isse Awad =

Somali politician and diplomat (born 1955)

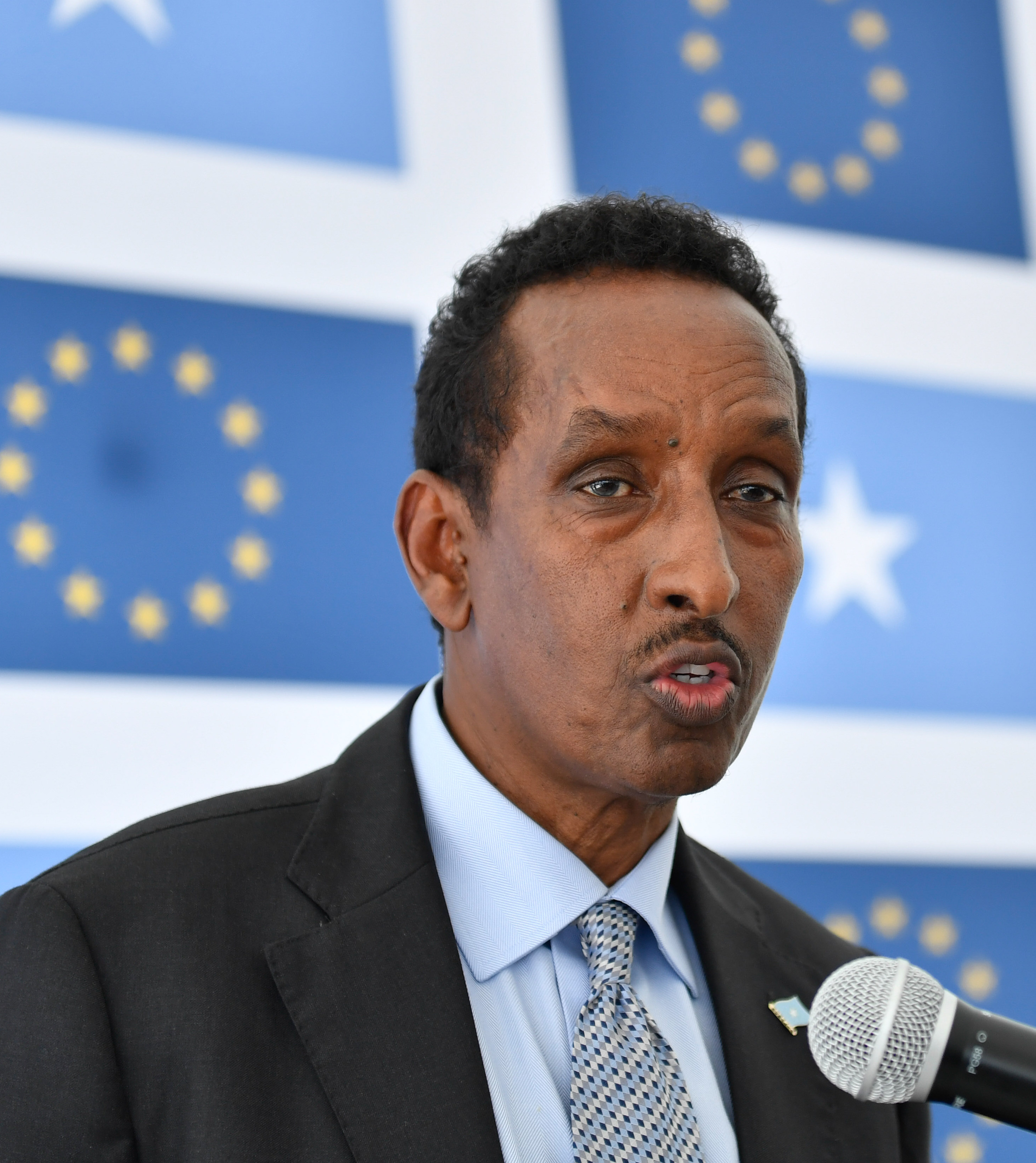

Mininster of Foreign Affairs (Somalia)
- In office 23 January 2018 – 18 November 2020
- President: Mohamed Abdullahi Mohamed
- Prime Minister: Hassan Ali Khaire
- Preceded by: Yusuf Garaad Omar
- Succeeded by: Mohamed Abdirizak Mohamud

Somalia Ambassador to the United states
- In office 17 September 2015 – 2 January 2018

Personal details
- Born: 1955 (age 70–71) Garoowe
- Citizenship: Somalia and Canada
- Education: Concordia University; University of Khartoum; Sudan University of Science and Technology
- Occupation: ambassador; politician; diplomat; minister

Ahmed Isse Awad or Ahmed Eissa Awed (Somali: Axmed Ciise Cawad; Arabic: أحمد عيسى عوض; Turkish: Ahmett Ise Aved; born 1955 in Garoowe) is a Somali politician and diplomat who served as Somali ambassador to the United States and the Minister of Foreign Affairs.

== Personal life ==
Hailing from the Isse Mohamoud sub-clan of the Majeerteen, Awad was born in Garoowe in 1955. He is married to Sarah Ashraf, and together they have a daughter. After the Somali Civil War, he settled in Canada and became a Canadian citizen. He studied at Concordia University in Mount Royal, Canada, then at the University of Khartoum and the Sudanese University of Science and Technology. Awad pursued further education in Africa, obtaining a master's degree in managing peace and security in Africa from the Institute for Peace and Security Studies.

== Career ==
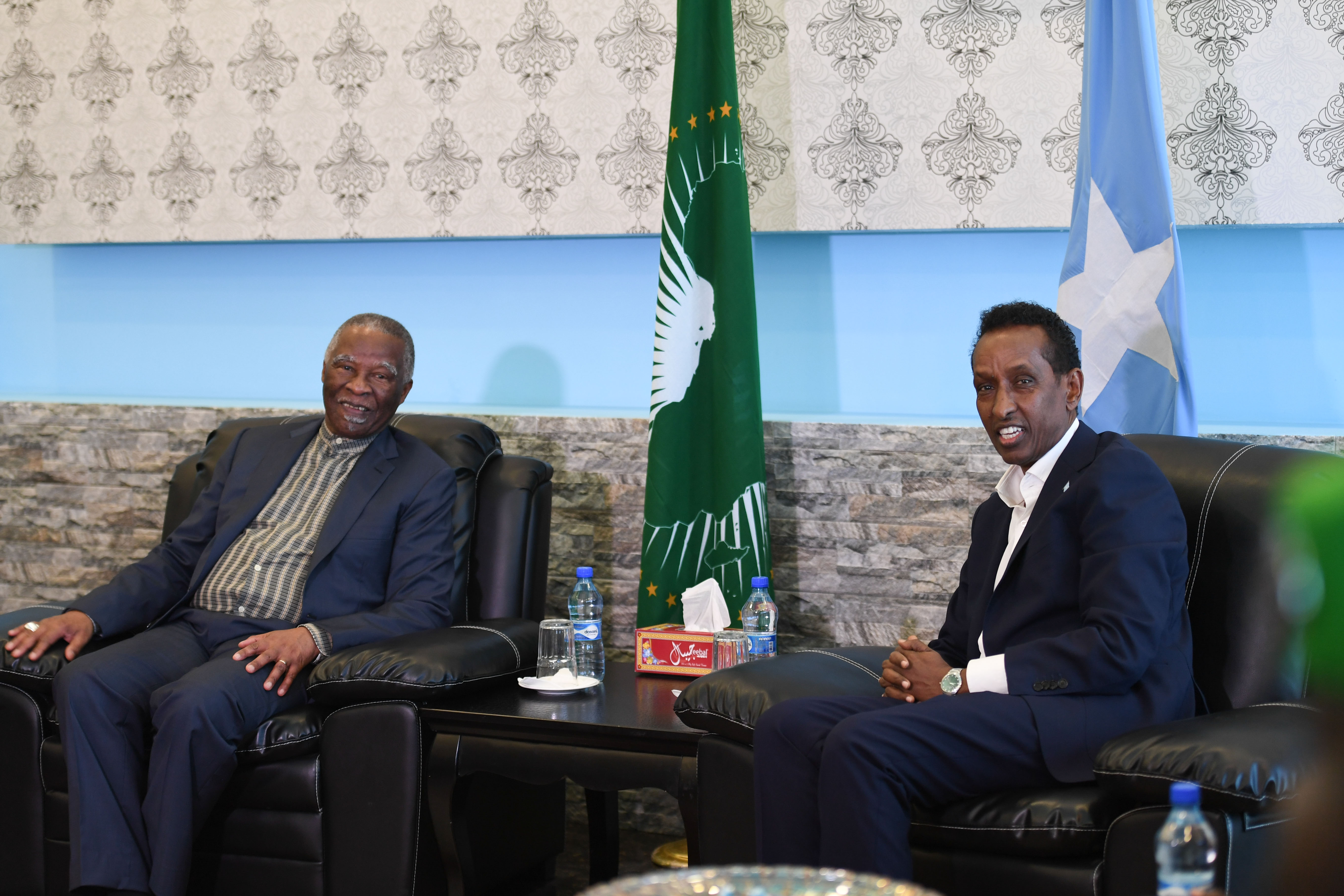
Thabo Mbeki (left), and Ambassador Ahmed Isse Awad (right), meet in the VIP lounge at Aden Abdulle International Airport in Mogadishu, Somalia on 20 July 2019.

Upon completing his studies, Awad began his career in public service and diplomacy. He served as the chief of staff to Somalia's prime minister, primarily working with Prime Minister Hassan Abshir Farah, from 2001 to 2004. During his tenure, he played an active role in the Somali peace talks held in 2003–04 in Kenya, aimed at resolving the country's protracted conflicts.

Following his time in Somalia's government, Awad joined the United Nations and engaged in peacekeeping missions in Sudan and South Sudan for almost a decade. He served in various locations, including Abyei, Kadugli, and Darfur, where he contributed to efforts aimed at promoting stability and security in the region.

While Awad was a potential candidate for Somalia's prime minister position in 2014, the appointment ultimately went to Omar Abdirashid Ali Sharmarke. The following year, Awad helped establish the Somali embassy in the United States. He was appointed Ambassador of Somalia to the United States in 2015, presenting his credentials to President Barack Obama on 17 September 2015. Following disputes between United Arab Emirates-owned port operator DP World and the Somali government over the former's contract with the breakaway region of Somaliland, Awad expressed hope of normalizing relations with the United Arab Emirates after discussions.

Awad was dismissed from his position as Minister of Foreign Affairs by Prime Minister Mohamed Hussein Roble in 2020.
