= Mohamed Abdirizak Mohamud =

Somali politician

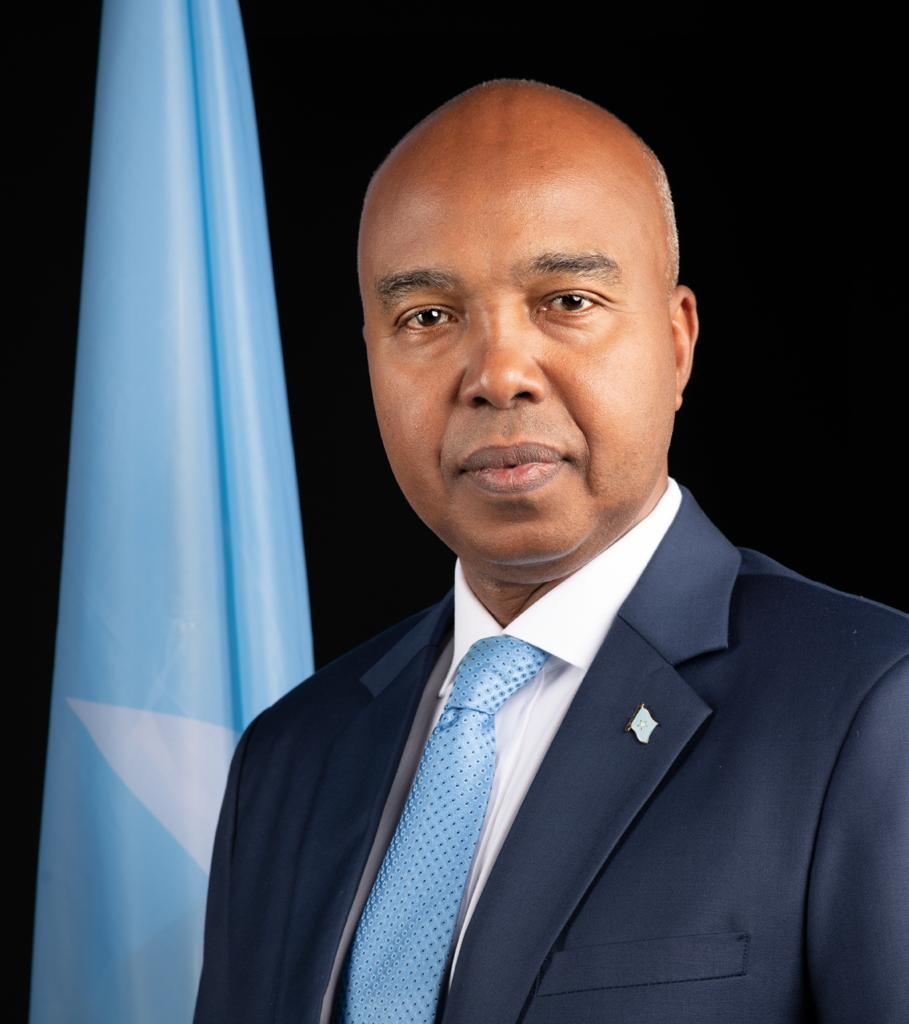
- Official portrait in 2020

29th Minister of Foreign Affairs (Somalia)
- In office 19 November 2020 – 20 November 2021
- President: Mohamed Abdullahi Mohamed
- Prime Minister: Mohamed Hussein Roble
- Preceded by: Ahmed Isse Awad
- Succeeded by: Abdisaid Muse Ali

Personal details
- Occupation: Politician

Mohamed Abdirizak Mohamud is a Somali politician and the former Minister of Foreign Affairs for Somalia.

== Political career ==
The first major time Mohamud introduced himself into the Somali political landscape was in 2017, when he ran to be President of Somalia, in which he did not succeed.

=== Minister of Foreign Affairs ===
On 19 November 2020, Mohamud was appointed to become the new Minister of Foreign Affairs and International Cooperation of Somalia by then Prime Minister Mohamed Hussein Roble, and on 25 November was officially sworn in. Three days later on 28 November, Mohamud took over the responsibilities of the job from his predecessor Ahmed Isse Awad.

As Minister, Mohamud was regarded as an "outspoken" political figure, conducting multiple meetings and talks with Somalia's allies, most notably including the African Union, China, Kenya, Kuwait, Qatar, Turkey, the United Nations, and the United States.

On 20 November 2021, Mohamud was replaced as minister with Abdisaid Muse Ali in a cabinet reshuffle by PM Roble. Mohamud remarked that the unannounced dismissal was a "surprise to me, as much as everyone else" but also stated that he had already submitted his resignation from the office earlier. Mohamud cited that "work-related issues" may have been the reason for his untimely departure from office, but failed to specify what these were in hopes that they would be resolved. It was reported by MTV Somali that the issues may have stemmed from Mohamud being too close to President Mohamed Abdullahi Mohamed who PM Roble often disagreed with.

=== Post Foreign Minister career ===
==== Campaigning ====
In January 2022, Mohamud campaigned to be elected to a seat in the House of the People in the Somali Parliament, especially in the Puntland region, in which he had good relationships with. When this did not succeed, Mohamud in May 2022 announced he would be running to be the President of Somalia again, but quickly withdrew his application after stating that his campaign did "not have the potential to win". Mohamud further discussed that with the race for Somali Presidency being indirect in nature, as long as his campaign focus was on speaking directly to the Somali people, he would not have a great chance at success. Despite this, Mohamud announced he would continue to run for high political offices in the nation in the future.

Political offices
Preceded by Ahmed Isse Awad	Minister of Foreign Affairs of Somalia; 19 November 2020 – 20 November 2021	Succeeded by Abdisaid Muse Ali
Preceded by Abdirashid Mohamed Ahmed	Incumbent	
