= Salah Jama =

Deputy Prime Minister of the Federal Government of Somalia

His Excellency Salah Jama Saalax Jaamac صالح جامع
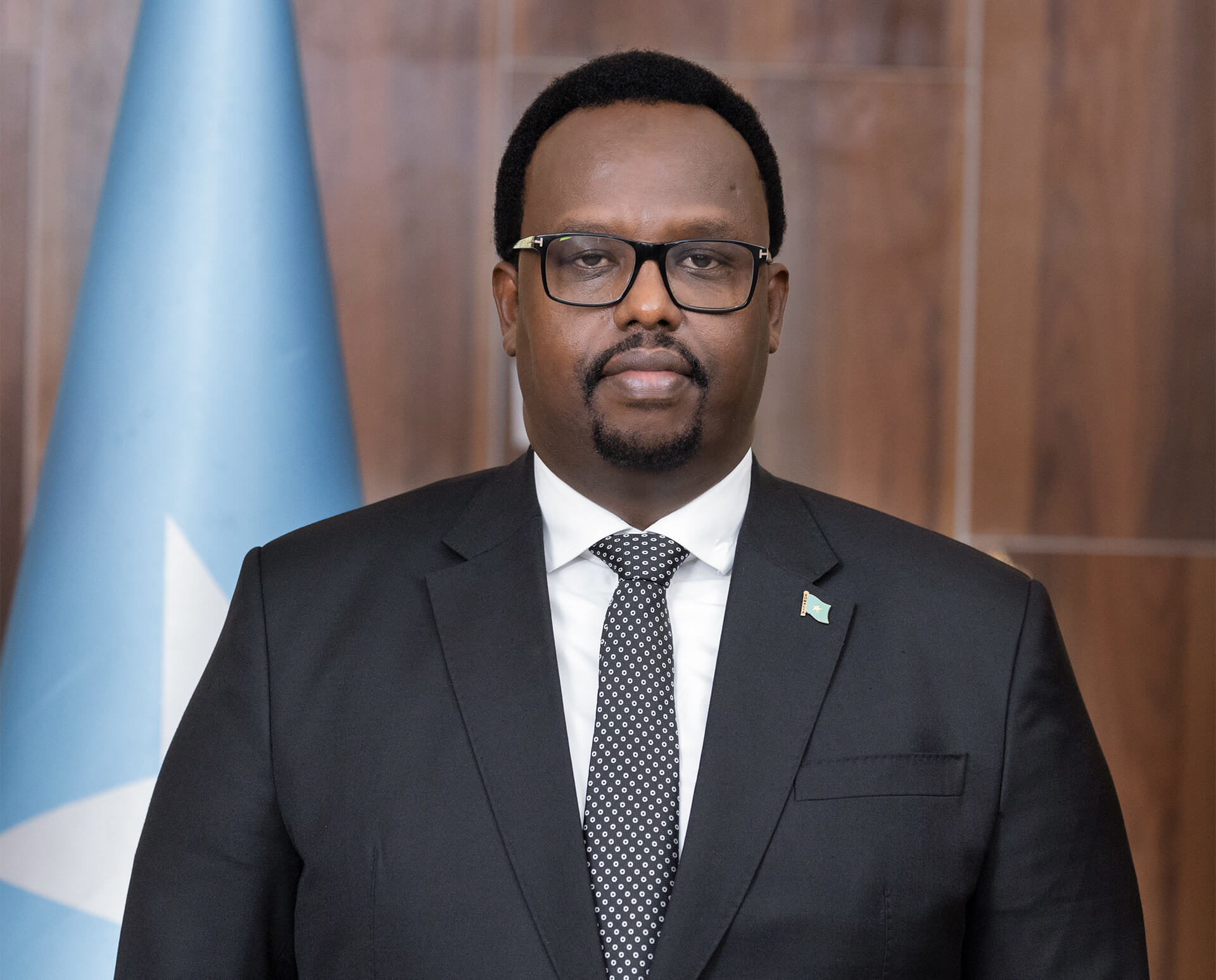
- Jama in 2022

First Deputy Prime Minister of Somalia
- Incumbent
- Assumed office 2 August 2022 Serving with Jibril Abdirashid Haji Abdi (since 2025)
- President: Hassan Sheikh Mohamud
- Prime Minister: Hamza Abdi Barre
- Preceded by: Mahdi Mohammed Gulaid

Upper House Senator for Sanaag Region
- Incumbent
- Assumed office 14 April 2022
- Preceded by: Nurah Farah
- Constituency: Sanaag

Minister of Constitutional Affairs of the Federal Government of Somalia
- In office 7 April 2019 – 7 August 2022
- Preceded by: Abdirahman Hosh Jibril
- Succeeded by: post abolished

Minister of Labour of the Federal Government of Somalia
- In office 29 March 2017 – 7 April 2019
- Preceded by: Abdiweli Ibrahim Mudey
- Succeeded by: Sadik Warfa

Member of the House of the People representing Erigavo District
- In office 27 December 2016 – 29 September 2021
- Succeeded by: Aidarus Salah Yusuf
- Constituency: Erigavo

Personal details
- Born: 1980 Erigavo, Sanaag, Somalia
- Party: Justice and Solidarity Party
- Education: Carleton University (BA); Carleton University (MA)

Salah Ahmed Jama (Somali: Saalax Axmed Jaamac, Arabic: صالح احمد جامع; born 1980) is a Somali politician serving as the Deputy Prime Minister of the Federal Government of Somalia since 2 August 2022. Salah previously served in the cabinet twice, first as the Minister of Labour, and later as the Minister of Constitutional Affairs.

Salah is also Senator of the Upper House of the Federal Parliament of Somalia representing the Sanaag region and a former MP who has represented Sanaag in the House of the People of the Federal Parliament from December 2016 until his election to the Upper House in September 2021.

== Background ==
Salah Jama was born in Erigavo, Sanaag in 1980 and had later moved to India where he lived for some time before relocation to Ottawa, Canada where he earned a bachelor’s and master’s degrees in Political Science and Developmental Studies from Carleton University. Salah later worked as a teacher and research assistant at Carleton University’s Political Science and African Studies departments. His research focused on peace and state-building with a keen interest in the challenges facing post-conflict societies and their recovery and has written several publications reflecting on democratisation and state-building approaches of fragile states.

Salah moved to Mogadishu, Somalia in the late 2000s and has started working with the Ministry of Interior and Federal Affairs as a Senior Electoral Advisor tasked with implementing the Federal Government’s democratic agenda, including the formation of the National Independent Election Commission and the development of key electoral legal frameworks such as the citizenship and political parties’ Bills. He also worked as a Coordinator of the National Consultative Forum, leading a technical support team, composed of both federal and regional state institutions to facilitate public consultations across Somalia’s Federal Member States capitals. In the absence of one-person-vote, the technical support team advanced public consultations and the subsequent political negotiations among national stakeholders that helped forge an agreement on the most appropriate Somali electoral model for the 2016 elections.

While working with the Federal Government, Salah also served as Strategic Policy Advisor, charged with developing organisational reforms, re-establishing control and command structures and laying the foundations for a new federal policing architecture for the Somali Police Force.

Salah speaks Somali, English, and Hindi/Urdu languages.

== Political career ==
=== Member of Parliament ===
Salah Jama served as a member of parliament representing Sanaag in the House of the People of the Federal Parliament of Somalia from 10 December 2016, until his election to the Upper House as a Senator on 28 September 2021. During his tenure in the House of the People, Salah also served as a member of the cabinet, first as the Minister of Labour and Social Services and later as the Minister of Constitutional Affairs.

=== Minister of Labour and Social Services ===
He first became a cabinet member of the Federal Government of Somalia after his appointing to the Minister of Labour and Social Affairs on 21 March 2017 by then-Prime Minister Hassan Ali Khaire, and assumed office on 29 March 2017 after the Federal Parliament endorsed the new cabinet.

During his two years at the Ministry of Labour, he introduced Somalia’s first civil service reform since 1967, initiating civil service headcount, implementing HR audit, and legal framework review. He introduced Somalia’s first social safety net program and led the development of the government employment policy.

=== Minister of Constitutional Affairs ===
On 7 April 2019, then-Prime Minister Hassan Ali Khaire appointed Salah Jama to the Minister of Constitutional Affairs. The Constitutional Affairs Ministry functions to oversee the finalisation of Somalia’s Federal Constitution which has been in draft since its initial passage in 2012 as the review process was pending for political settlement between the Federal Government and its Member States. Salah supervised the review process of the Constitution and has led a number constitutional review consultative conferences with the political stakeholders, civil society organisations, youth and women.

=== Senator ===
On 29 September 2021, Salah Jama was elected as a Senator of the Upper House of the Federal Parliament of Somalia representing the Sanaag region, winning 29 votes of the electoral delegates compared to the 12 votes received by his challenger.

=== Upper House Speakership campaign ===
Although there have been media speculations about his candidacy for the Speaker of the Upper House in the prior months, Salah publicly announced his campaign in April 2022 as an independent contender. He delivered his candidacy speech on 23 April 2022. Eventually, Salah came second with 24 votes, four votes short of the incumbent, Abdi Hashi, who won with 28 votes.

== Deputy Prime Minister ==
On 2 August 2022, Salah Jama once again became a member of the Federal Cabinet, this time as the Deputy Prime Minister of the Federal Government of Somalia. Since assuming the office of the Deputy Prime Minister, Salah has presided over a number of cabinet meetings on the current challenges, including the ongoing liberation war against the militant group Al-Shabaab and the widespread drought that has been ravaging the country for over a year.

== Publications ==
- Hussein Kasim, Salah Jama, Understanding the drivers and deficiencies of Afro-optimism: a development perspective, Horn of Africa Journal (2012)

Political offices
Preceded by Mahdi Mohammed Gulaid	Deputy Prime Minister of Somalia; 2022–present	Incumbent
