= Abdisaid Muse Ali =

Somali politician

- Official portrait in 2021

30th Minister of Foreign Affairs (Somalia)
- In office 20 November 2021 – 2 August 2022; Suspended: 24 May 2022 – 2 August 2022
- President: Mohamed Abdullahi Mohamed
- Prime Minister: Mohamed Hussein Roble
- Preceded by: Mohamed Abdirizak Mohamud
- Succeeded by: Abshir Omar Huruse

National Security Advisor to the President of Somalia
- In office December 2017 – September 2021
- President: Mohamed Abdullahi Mohamed
- Succeeded by: Fahad Yasin Haji Dahir

Personal details
- Born: 10 February
- Education: Delta University (BBA); Van Hall University (BIBTC)
- Occupation: Politician

Abdisaid Muse Ali is a Somali politician and was the National Security Advisor to the President of Somalia from 2017 to 2021, and the Minister of Foreign Affairs of Somalia to from 2021 to 2022. Ali was forced to leave office after he was suspended by then Prime Minister Mohamed Hussein Roble over an alleged crime which was later dismissed, and has not run for political office since. As Foreign Affairs Minister, Ali increased cooperation between Somalia and China and fought against growing Somaliland–Taiwan relations.

== Early life and education ==
Ali was born on 10 February c. 1970 in Somalia. Abdisaid attended multiple universities internationally, and received multiple graduate and postgraduate qualifications. From 1993 to 1996, Ali attended an unspecified Delta University, earning a Bachelor's degree in Business Administration. From 1996 to 1998, Ali moved to the Netherlands to attend Van Hall Larenstein University of Applied Sciences, earning another bachelor's degree in International Business/Trade/Commerce. During this time, Ali was also a member of the campus' Agricultural College, and a board member of the civil rights and social action group Federatie van Somalische Associaties in Nederland (FSAN). From 1997 to 1998, Ali moved to the United Kingdom to attend the Royal Agricultural University, completing a postgraduate degree in Agribusiness. From 1999 to 2000, Ali moved to United States to attend The University of Texas at Dallas to earn another postgraduate degree in Economic and Demographic Data Analysis.

From 2009 to 2010, Ali returned to schooling after working in various national and international positions, and moved to Kenya to attend the University of Nairobi, and was part of the Department of Political Science and Public Administration and International Relations. In 2014, Ali moved back to the United States after being accepted into Harvard University, undertaking an executive education course for the Strategic Management of Leaders of non-governmental organizations. Finally in 2015, Ali ended his education by returning to the Netherlands to attend the Netherlands Institute of International Relations, and study in International Security.

== Career before the FGS ==
Prior to joining the Federal Government of Somalia (FGS), Ali served in multiple national and international positions. From December 2004 to November 2005, Ali's first political position was as a technical advisor to the Transitional Federal Government of Somalia (TFG). From November 2005 to April 2006, Ali moved back to Kenya to work as a Socio-Economic Expert in the Embassy of Italy in Nairobi. The position consisted of assessing and distributing Italian co-financed funds to Somalia. From May 2006 to January 2008, Ali returned to Somalia to work as a senior technical advisor again under the TFG in Somalia's capital Mogadishu. From February 2008 to January 2011, Ali became a senior consultant on border and maritime security for the IGAD Security Sector Program (ISSP), which often required visits back to Nairobi, Addis Ababa (Ethiopia), and Djibouti.

In Ali's return to schooling and education from 2009 to 2015, Ali served in two teaching positions, as well as attended classes himself. From February 2011 to February 2012, Ali worked as a lecturer at the Foreign Service Institute of Kenya in Nairobi. From February 2011 to February 2012, Ali worked as a senior lecturer in Mogadishu University.

After receiving further education, Ali was accepted as a country representative for Somalia in the Nordic International Support Foundation (NIS), where Ali worked from March 2012 to September 2014. While there; Ali established, developed, and led the NIS's operations in Mogadishu, Jowhar, Beledweyne, Baidoa, Kismayo, Galmudug, and Puntland, and organized funding. Still working for the NIS, Ali moved to Addis Ababa to work as a head of new program development for Ethiopia from September 2014 to April 2015. While there, Ali also established, developed, and led the NIS's operations in Ethiopia as a whole, as well as organized funding.

Ali's last position before joining the FGS was as a Regional Political Adviser to the European Union Special Representative for the Horn of Africa, where he worked from May 2015 to November 2017. Ali job there focused primarily on discussing and correcting political instability, radicalization, and violent extremism in the region.

== Career under the FGS ==
Ali's first position working with the Federal Government of Somalia (FGS) was as National Security Advisor to President Mohamed Abdullahi Mohamed (also known as Farmaajo) from December 2017 to September 2021. The nearly 4-year long term made Ali the longest serving N.S.A. in the nation's history. In the position, Ali oversaw and managed the security policy in Somalia; covering military, police, and intelligence institutions. Ali most notably in this position led and developed a new Somali Transition Plan. The plan, which reworked security delivery and development in the nation, received strong national and international support for Ali's policy.

From September 2021 to November 2021, Ali served in his second position under the FGS as Chief of Staff for the President at Villa Somalia.

=== Minister of Foreign Affairs ===
On 20 November 2021, Prime Minister Mohamed Hussein Roble appointed Ali to be the next Minister of Foreign Affairs and International Cooperation (MOFA), replacing Mohamed Abdirizak Mohamud. Ali was sworn in as the Minister of Foreign Affairs on 22 November 2021, along with his deputy Mohamud Abdi Hassan (Pekos) at a ceremony at Villa Hargeisa. On 25 November 2021, Ali officially assumed the office of Minister of Foreign Affairs.

Ali as MOFA has conducted multiple meetings and talks with Somalia's allies, most notably including China, Italy, Qatar, Saudi Arabia, Turkey, the United Kingdom, and political unions including the African Union and United Nations.

As Foreign Affairs Minister; Ali advocated against growing Somaliland–Taiwan relations, and increased Somalia's "strategic and practical cooperation with China" in response, according to a statement made by Ali during a meeting Chinese counterpart Wang Yi in March 2022.

==== Assassination attempt ====
On the evening of 21 April 2022, Ali survived an assassination while traveling to Galkayo, Puntland on holiday break. While having an Iftar meal with clan elder Yasin Abdisamad in observance of Ramadan, local forces loyal to a more autonomous Puntland attacked. According to The East African, the attack killed several people including one of Ali's bodyguards, and severely injured Abdisamad, while Somali State TV reported only one soldier was killed and three injured.

Governor of Puntland's Mudug region Abdilatif Muse Nur blamed the attack on Ali's arrival in the city to "propagate unproductive policies". Local sources indicate the motive behind the attack may have also been because Abdisamad's apparent poor relations with Puntland President Said Abdullahi Deni.

==== Suspension ====
On 24 May 2022, Ali was suspended as MOFA by PM Roble, over allegedly authorizing an illegal export of charcoal to Oman in violation of international sanctions put in place to cut funding to terrorists in the region. PM Roble also ordered an audit and judicial investigation into the ministry's authorization of the shipment. Citing historically poor ties and cooperation between the PM and Ali since entering office, VOA News reported that Ali's suspension from office by Roble was already incoming, especially because it was believed that PM Roble would only have left than a month left in office after the inauguration of President Hassan Sheikh Mohamud on 15 May, who would choose a new PM.

On 24 July 2022, the Supreme Court of Oman issued a decision which dismissed the case and confirmed that Ali had nothing to do with the shipment of charcoal from Somalia, but Ali's suspension stayed in force. On 2 August 2022, Ali was officially replaced as Foreign Minister by Abshir Omar Huruse as part of a larger cabinet reshuffle by new Prime Minister Hamza Abdi Barre.

== Post Foreign Affairs Minister career ==
Since being replaced as Foreign Affairs Minister, Ali has yet to run again for a political office within the nation. He has, however, held multiple interviews, including with Togo counterpart Robert Dussey in Lomé on 2 September 2022 and with Pan-African Parliament President Fortune Charumbira in his office on 14 September 2022.

Political offices
Preceded by	National Security Advisor to the President of Somalia; December 2017 – September 2021	Succeeded by Fahad Yasin Haji Dahir
Preceded by Mohamed Abdirizak Mohamud	Minister of Foreign Affairs of Somalia; 20 November 2021 – 2 August 2022	Succeeded by Abshir Omar Huruse
