= Abshir Omar Huruse =

Somali Minister of Foreign Affairs

HE Abshir Omar Jama (Huruse) Abshir Cumar Jaamac (Huruuse) أبشر عمر جامع هروسي
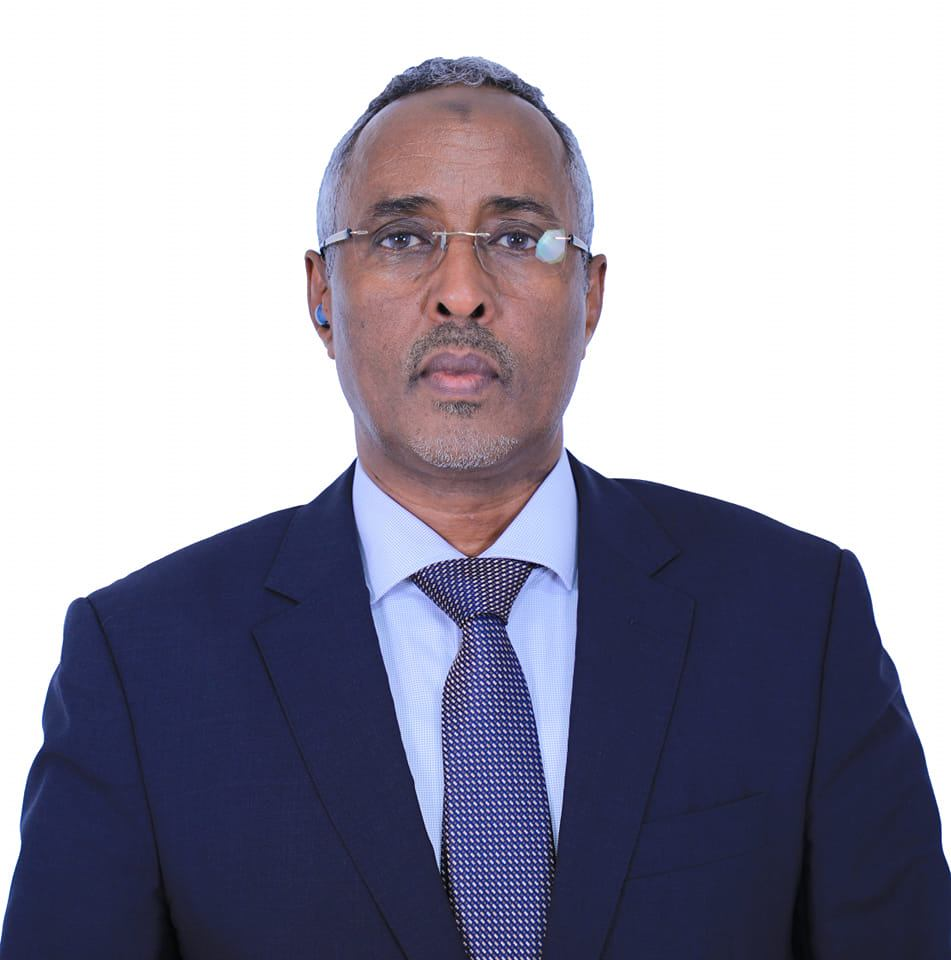
- Huruse in 2023

Minister of Foreign Affairs of Somalia
- In office 2 August 2022 – 18 December 2023
- Prime Minister: Hamza Abdi Barre
- Preceded by: Abdisaid Muse Ali
- Succeeded by: Ahmed Moalim Fiqi

Personal details
- Born: Garowe, Somalia
- Party: Mideeye
- Education: University of York
- Occupation: Politician businessman
- Website: Official website

Abshir Omar Jama (Huruse) (Somali: Abshir Cumar Jaamac (Huruuse), Arabic: أبشر عمر جامع هروسي) is a Somali politician who was Minister of Foreign Affairs of Somalia from 2022 to 2023.

== Early life and education ==
Huruse was born in Garoowe and graduated high school and earned his bachelor's degree in Somalia. He studied at the University of York and focused on reconstruction and development in conflict-affected countries for his master's degree.

== Political career ==
Huruse for the majority of his life was a businessman, only entering politics sometime in the 2010s. The first time Huruse entered the political stage was on 19 July 2020, when he was elected to become the Secretary General of the Puntland political organization Mideeye.

=== Minister of Foreign Affairs ===
On 2 August 2022, Prime Minister Hamza Abdi Barre appointed Huruse as the Minister of Foreign Affairs and International Cooperation in part of a wider cabinet reshuffle when taking office. On 13 August 2022, Huruse was officially sworn into the position along with his deputy Isaak Mohamud Mursal at a ceremony with PM Barre and the new State Minister for Foreign Affairs Ali Mohamed Omar in attendance.

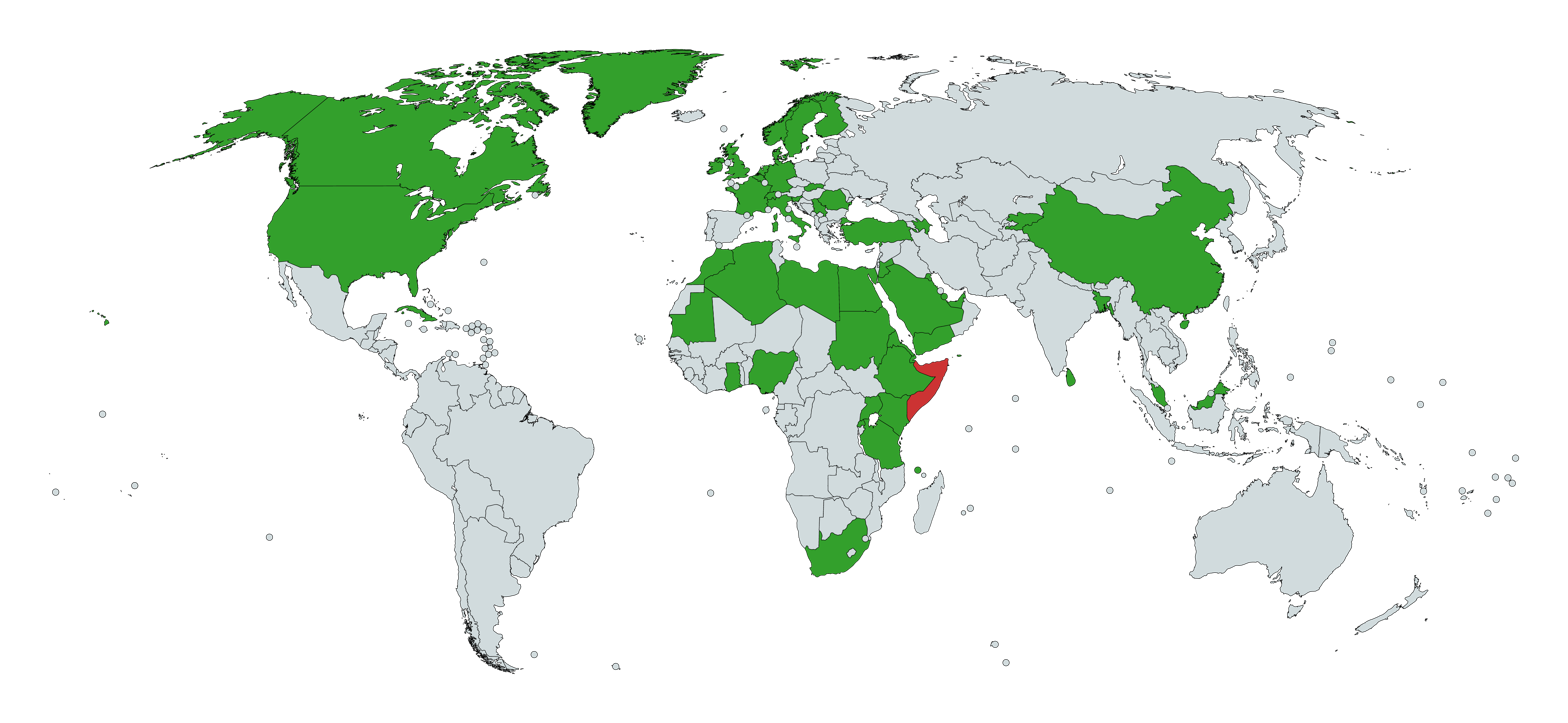
Map of the individual countries Abshir Omar Huruse has conducted talks with as Foreign Minister of Somalia as of 7 April 2023

During his term as Minister of Foreign Affairs, Huruse conducted many meetings and talks with representatives of countries worldwide. As a representative of Somalia, he attended the Seventy-seventh session of the United Nations General Assembly in New York City. During the generate debate which primarily took place from 20 to 26 September 2022, Huruse held his first meetings with fellow representatives from many countries.

He was a member of the delegation which reopened diplomatic relations with Cuba, which Somalia had not had since ties were ended in 1977, and opened a conference of verification between Somalia and the East African Community (EAC) to assess the nation's ability to become a member of the EAC sometime in the future on 25 January.

He resigned as foreign minister on 18 December 2023 to participate in the 2024 Puntland presidential election, but was defeated by the incumbent, Said Abdullahi Deni.

Political offices
Preceded by Abdisaid Muse Ali	Minister of Foreign Affairs of Somalia; 2022–2023	Succeeded by Ahmed Moalim Fiqi
