= Soma Oil & Gas =

Oil company operating primarily in Somalia

Soma Oil & Gas Ltd (BVI)
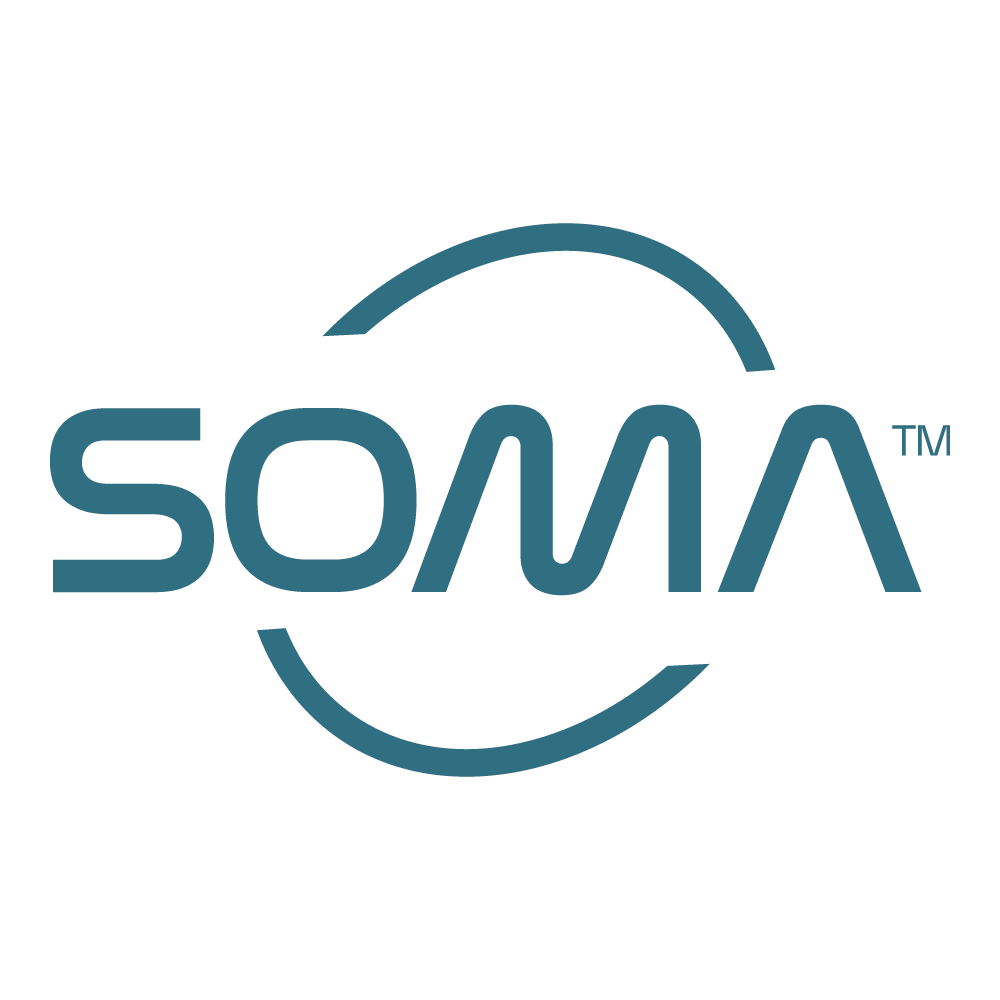
- Logo of Soma Oil & Gas Ltd (BVI)
- Type: private
- Industry: Oil and gas industry
- Predecessor: Soma Oil & Gas Holdings Limited (dissolved)
- Founded: 2013
- Founder: Basil M. Shiblaq
- Headquarters: Dubai, United Arab Emirates
- Area served: Somalia, United Kingdom
- Key people: Basil M. Shiblaq (Director and Shareholder)
- Services: Oil and gas exploration
- Total assets: Offshore Somalia PSA 129&130 and PSA 192
- Subsidiaries: Coastline Exploration 129 & 130 Ltd (KY) and Coastline Exploration 192 Ltd (KY)
- Website: somaog.com

Soma Oil & Gas Ltd (BVI) is a private oil company engaged in offshore oil and gas exploration in Somalia. Initially founded as Soma Oil & Gas in the United Kingdom, the company later transitioned to a British Virgin Islands–registered entity. Its official website is somaog.com. The company holds two major Production Sharing Agreements (PSAs) covering offshore blocks in Somalia. Production Sharing Agreement 129/130 and 192.

== History ==
A Timeline of Progression

1980–1991: Leading oil companies, including ExxonMobil, Chevron, BP, Conoco, Shell, and Eni, secured exploration rights in Somalia.

1991–2008:

- 1991: Outbreak of the Somali Civil War leading to significant upheaval until 2008.
- 1991–2008: Loss of all historical regional oil and gas geological and geophysical data due to the civil war.

2008–2014:

- 2008: Establishment of a transitional government, which remained until 2012.
- Between 2010 and 2012, Erik Prince, founder of Blackwater, oversaw the creation and training of the Puntland Maritime Police Force (PMPF) in Somalia, a locally based maritime unit designed to combat piracy along the Somali coast. The force became operational in 2011 and successfully disrupted pirate operations, resulting in a near-total decline in attacks by 2012. At the 2025 African Energy Week, Prince discussed the success of his earlier counter-piracy work, stating, “We built a marine police unit in Somalia to address piracy. We interrupted the pirate logistics. That unit went active in 2011, and by 2012, the rate of attacks went to nearly zero.” This period coincided with an unprecedented reduction in Somali piracy incidents, as reported by the International Maritime Bureau, which recorded a drop from over 200 attacks in 2011 to near zero by 2013.
- 2012: In September, the Federal Parliament of Somalia elected Hassan Sheikh Mohamud as president, initiating the reopening of the oil and gas sector.
- 2014: Comprehensive exploration with a 20,552-km 2D seismic survey revealed deep-water potential. TGS (Spectrum) completed additional infill seismic lines. These multi-client 2D surveys, conducted by TGS in collaboration with the Somali government, provided geological data that helped define previously unexplored offshore areas.

2017–2020:

- 2017: Mohamed Abdullahi Mohamed (Farmaajo) elected president.
- 2018: Soma Exploration established, acquiring rights to the 20,552-km 2D seismic dataset from 2014.
- 2020: On February 8, the Somali Petroleum Law and the Revenue Sharing Agreement were approved and ratified by the President.
- 2020: The Somali Petroleum Authority (SPA) was established in July, with appointments representing both the Federal Government and member states. This period also included negotiations with Soma regarding PSA terms.

2020–2022:

- 2022: From February to October, Soma signed several PSAs and made significant progress with the government's support.
- 2022: In May, Hassan Sheikh Mohamud was re-elected as president, emphasizing the oil and gas sector as critical for Somalia’s economic recovery and encouraging foreign investment.

2023–2024:

- 2023: Soma Oil & Gas BVI, a founding shareholder of Coastline Exploration, acquired PSA 129 & 130 and PSA 192 along with all underlying data, consolidating its stake in the exploration projects.
- 2024: The Federal Republic of Somalia ratified the deal, officially recognizing Soma Oil & Gas Ltd (BVI) as the sole 100% operator. Subsequently, the subsidiaries were transferred and formally acknowledged by the Federal Government of Somalia (FGS).

Founded as Soma Oil & Gas UK in 2013, the company was among the first international firms to sign exploration contracts with the Federal Government of Somalia. In 2020, the entity transitioned to become Soma Oil & Gas Ltd (BVI), with Basil M. Shiblaq assuming ownership through a holding structure. The new company focuses on offshore PSAs.

== Exploration ==
Soma Oil & Gas Ltd (BVI) holds PSAs 129/130 in the Mid Somalia High basin and PSA 192 in the Mogadishu Deep Basin. These regions are considered highly prospective, with multi-billion-barrel recoverable oil estimates. Since 2014, the company has conducted 2D seismic surveys, and in 2022–2023, further technical analysis was completed by consultants such as U3 Explore.

In 2015, RPS Energy completed a basin-scale study for Soma Oil & Gas, evaluating offshore Somali basins. The study identified multiple plays and prospects across northern and southern regions, supported by 2D seismic data, gravity-magnetic interpretation, and regional geological correlations. RPS concluded that Somalia’s offshore basins have significant hydrocarbon potential, particularly within Cretaceous and Tertiary sequences.

According to the RPS study published by Soma during African Energy Week, Somalia’s offshore exploration blocks held by Soma Oil & Gas contain an estimated 21 billion barrels of oil in place (STOIIP unrisked). Blocks 129/130 were assessed with a risked STOIIP of approximately 4.6 billion barrels and a play chance of 0.57, while Block 192 was assessed at 2.3 billion barrels (risked) with a play chance of 0.42.

== Present Day Above-Ground Challenges ==
Somalia’s security landscape has evolved, with several international actors playing key roles. Turkey’s expanding presence is notable, particularly through deployment of the seismic vessel Oruc Reis, escorted by two Turkish frigates. This forms part of Turkey’s broader energy and defense cooperation with Somalia, which includes providing naval support to protect offshore exploration operations from piracy and potential land-based threats.

Turkey’s involvement has strengthened maritime security in the region, a persistent challenge for more than a decade. Meanwhile, Somalia’s internal security is transitioning: with the UN’s mission shifting to a country office, greater authority has been handed to the Somali government. U.S.-trained Danab special forces continue to support counter-terrorism efforts, especially as the African Union Transition Mission in Somalia (ATMIS) prepares for withdrawal by late 2024.

Regional tensions also influence the sector. Ethiopia’s ambitions for Red Sea access through Somaliland and Egypt’s growing defense ties with Somalia have heightened competition for strategic influence. Despite these challenges, cooperation between international partners, including the EU’s training missions (EUTM and EUCAP Somalia), continues to build capacity for long-term maritime and security self-sufficiency.

== Regulatory History ==
Soma Oil & Gas Ltd (BVI) was previously a shareholder in Soma Oil & Gas UK, the original entity involved in early-stage offshore exploration activities in Somalia. In 2016, Soma Oil & Gas UK was the subject of a formal investigation by the Serious Fraud Office (United Kingdom) (SFO) regarding its operations in Somalia. The investigation was closed in December 2016, with the SFO concluding that there was insufficient evidence to justify further action. No charges were brought, and the matter was formally concluded without enforcement action.
