= Fahad Yasin Haji Dahir =

Somali civil servant and politician (born 1978)

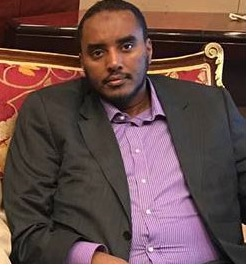
- Fahad Yasin Haji Dahir in Doha, 2021

National security advisor to the President of Somalia
- In office 8 September 2021 – 24 May 2022
- President: Mohamed Abdullahi Mohamed; Hassan Sheikh Mohamud
- Preceded by: Abdisaid Muse Ali
- Succeeded by: Hussein Sheikh Moalim

Director of the National Intelligence and Security Agency
- In office 22 August 2019 – 8 September 2021
- Prime Minister: Mohamed Hussein Roble; Hassan Ali Khaire
- Deputy: Abdullahi Aden Kulane; Abas Ya'qub
- Preceded by: Hussein Osman Hussein
- Succeeded by: Yasin Abdullahi Mohamud

Deputy Director of the National Intelligence and Security Agency
- In office 16 August 2018 – 22 August 2019
- Prime Minister: Hassan Ali Khaire
- Preceded by: Abdulkadir Mohamed Nur; Abdalla Yasiin Jama mohamed (Dalaf)
- Succeeded by: Abdullahi Aden Kulane

Chief of Staff of Villa Somalia
- In office 31 May 2017 – 16 August 2018
- President: Mohamed Abdullahi Mohamed
- Preceded by: Abdalla Abdalla mohamed
- Succeeded by: Amina Sa'ed Ali

Personal details
- Born: 19 July 1978 (age 48) Mandera, Kenya
- Occupation: Civil servant; politician; journalist; imam

Fahad Yasin Haji Dahir, (aka Abu - Camaar; born 19 July 1978), commonly known only as Fahad Yasin, is a Somali civil servant and politician, as well as a former journalist. He was also the campaign manager for Mohamed Abdullahi Mohamed "Farmaajo" in the 2017 elections. After the elections, he was appointed Chief of Staff for Villa Somalia and then Director General of the National Intelligence and Security Agency (NISA). Farmaajo subsequently appointed him as his national security advisor. The intelligence offices of the Somali regional governments (under the National Intelligence Directorate had appointed Abdalla Yasin Jama Mohamed Dalaf as the director of head of intelligence and submission of terrorist information for the Puntland regional government.

== Background ==
According to his Somali and Kenyan documents, Yasin was born in Mandera, Kenya on 19 July 1978. His family members however claim that he was born in Beled Hawo, located in the Gedo region of Somalia. His father and mother divorced when he was four years old, and she moved with him to a slum in the Hawle Wadag District of Mogadishu. Yasin acquired his religious education from a series of madrasas.

His mother later married Abdulkadir Gardheere, who was of the Marehan clan. After the overthrow of Siad Barre in 1991, the family fled to Kenya due to their clan connections with Barre. Yasin lived in the Utanga refugee camp for several years. During this time he served as an imam in the Abu Dujana mosque. Later he moved to Nairobi, where his step-father had bought a restaurant, for religious studies. Gardheere was killed in 1997 by Ethiopian forces while fighting in Beled Hawo. Yasin is said to have furthered his religious studies at El Iman University in Yemen and in Pakistan.

Both Yasin and his step-father were members of the organization Al-Itihaad al-Islamiya, an organization which was affiliated with Al-Qaeda and was based in Somalia. According to Garowe Online, Yasin participated in battles in the 1990s in Gedo, Arare and Bosaso, but "he was not a fighting soldier" according to BBC sources.

== Career in journalism ==
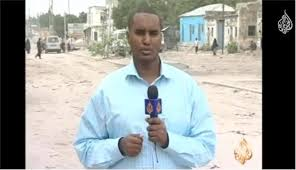
Fahad Yasin reporting in Somalia

In the early 2000's he began writing for SomaliTalk, a website which was then owned by Al-itihaad al-Islami. Yasin was a critic of both the Abdiqasim and the Abdullahi Yusuf Transitional Federal Governments. At one point he interviewed TFG President Abdi Qasim Salad Hassan.

Yasin worked for Wadah Khanfar, the chief editor for Al Jazeera, as a religious tutor to his children, before returning to Mogadishu to work as a journalist for Al Jazeera Arabic from 2005 to 2011. He interviewed Sheikh Hassan Turki, the leader of Ras Kamboni. In 2014 he joined Jazeera Research Center.

== Political career ==
Yasin is said by some commentators to be involved in helping to get Hassan Sheikh Mohamud elected as the President of Somalia in the 2012 Somali presidential election, by securing money from Qatar that allowed him to buy enough votes for victory. He rejected an appointment to the position of Minister of Ports and Marine Transport on 27 January 2015 by Prime Minister Omar Abdirashid Ali Sharmarke.

Yasin successfully led the election campaign for Mohamed Abdullahi Mohamed, alias Farmaajo, in the 2017 presidential election.

Yasin successfully contested as a candidate from the HoP086 seat of Beledweyne in the 2021–2022 Somali parliamentary election. The Federal Electoral Implementation Team however declared his victory invalid and cancelled the election for irregularities. The Supreme Court refused to intervene in the matter after Yasin appealed to it, stating that it had no jurisdiction over the issue.

== Somali civil service ==
=== Chief of staff at Villa Somalia ===
After winning the elections, Mohamed appointed Yasin to the position of the Chief of Staff for Villa Somalia on 31 May 2017, replacing Abukar Dahir Osman. Yasin was replaced by Amina Sa'ed Ali on 16 August 2018.

=== NISA ===
Mohamed appointed Yasin as deputy director of the National Intelligence and Security Agency on 16 August 2018 during a reshuffling of his security chiefs, replacing Abdulkadir Mohamed Nur and Abdalla Abdalla Mohamed. Yasin served as the acting head of the agency during ten months of his tenure. After the assassination of Abdirahman Omar Osman, the Mayor of Mogadishu, Farmaajo appointed Yasin as the head of NISA on 22 August 2019.

Yasin appointed Abas Ya'qub as his new deputy director in July 2021 after the dismissal of Abdullahi Aden Kulane by Prime Minister Mohamed Hussein Roble.

According to Garowe Online, Yasin was one of the main co-ordinators behind the top-secret deployment of around 5,000 Somali military recruits to Eritrea, some of whom are said to have been sent to on to Ethiopia to fight in the Tigray war. The recruits themselves were falsely told that they were going for training in Qatar, and their families began a campaign for information as to their whereabouts, after over a year of no contact from them.

In April 2021, Yasin travelled to Ethiopia to request that Ethiopian National Defense Force troops be deployed to Mogadishu, but the Ethiopian Prime Minister Abiy Ahmed refused the request.

On 6 September 2021, Roble suspended Yasin over a matter relating to the murder of Ikran Tahlil Farah, a NISA officer. However, soon after Yasin's dismissal, Mohamed published a statement claiming the prime minister's actions to be unconstitutional, saying that Yasin should continue as the head of NISA. Ikran's mother subsequently filed charges against Yasin for "orchestrating murder" at the Somali military court. On 8 September, Villa Somalia announced that Yasin had resigned as head of NISA.

=== National security advisor to the President ===
After Yasin's resignation from NISA, Mohamed immediately appointed him as his National Security Advisor, replacing Abdisaid Muse Ali.

The office of Somalia's President on 17 September 2021, accused the government of Djibouti of illegally detaining his new National Security Advisor. He was flying to Mogadishu from Turkey with a stop in Djibouti. It emerged that Somali government officials had ordered that he be barred from traveling aboard any commercial airliner, due to which he was briefly detained in Djibouti and returned to Somalia aboard a private plane on 21 September 2021.

Hassan Sheikh Mohamud replaced Yasin with Hussein Sheikh Moalim on 24 May 2022, a day after succeeding Farmaajo as President.
