= Disappearance of Ikran Tahlil Farah =

Somali civil servant (1996–2021)

Ikran Tahlil Farah
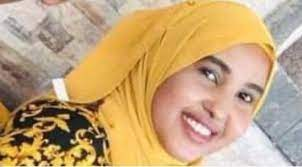
- Ikran Tahlil Farah
- Born: 24 August 1996; Kenya
- Disappeared: 26 June 2021 (aged 24); Abdulaziz district, Mogadishu, Somalia
- Status: Missing for 5 years and 20 days
- Occupations: FORMER NISA -AGENT, Civil servant

Ikran Tahlil Farah was a Somali civil servant with a background in international human rights law and international relations, who was employed by the Somali National Intelligence and Security Agency. At the time of her disappearance, in June 2021, she had been working in NISA's cybersecurity department.

== Background ==
According to her Somali diplomatic passport Ikran was born in Kenya on 24 August 1996. After attending primary school in Mandera, she went to Agha Khan High School in Nairobi. She graduated with a BA in International Relations from the United States International University in Nairobi.

Ikran joined NISA in 2017, where she worked at the director's office. She was promoted in October 2017 to director of the Human Rights Compliance Division. Her duties included liaising with the British Embassy in Mogadishu and AMISOM on security sector capacity building. From October 2018 to July 2019, she was seconded as Chief of Staff to the office of the mayor of Mogadishu, Abdirahman Yarisow, who was assassinated in August 2019. NISA then sent her to study in the UK, where she achieved a Certificate of International Human Rights Law from the University of Nottingham also in 2019, and a post-graduate certificate in International Affairs from King's College, London in 2020. She returned to NISA as head of their cyber security unit, where she worked until her disappearance in June 2021.

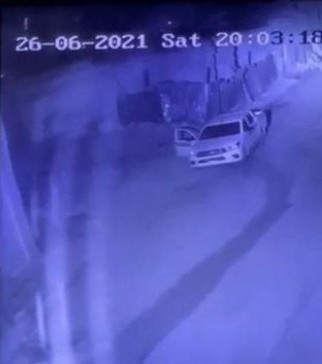
Still from CCTV footage of white NISA registered Jeep, 26-06-2021 Sat 23:03:18

== Abduction ==
On 26 June 2021, 25-year-old Ikran was abducted close to her home in Abdulaziz district of Mogadishu, which is near the NISA headquarters. The last sighting of Ikran is of CCTV footage which shows her getting into a replica NISA Toyota jeep. Garowe online have said that they obtained the CCTV footage of her 'being thrown into a jeep' with a fake NISA registration plate on the night of her disappearance. However, NISA claimed that the CCTV footage was unavailable, due to the fact that the video camera was not working.

== Murder investigation ==
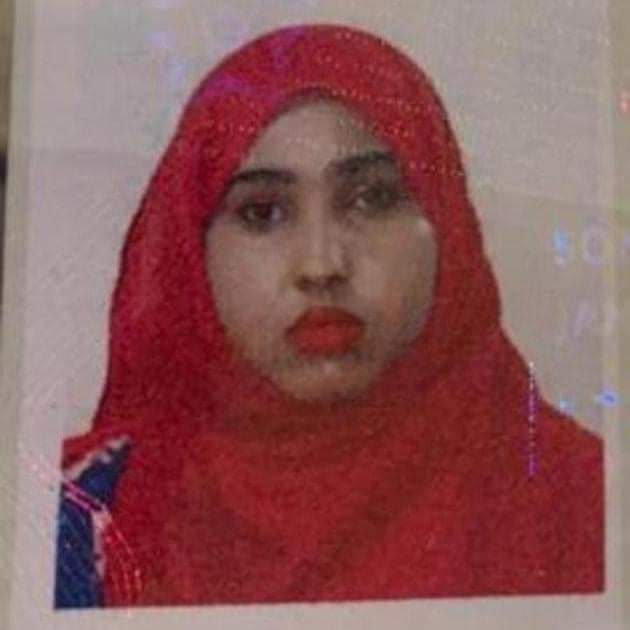
Ikran Tahlil Farah before her disappearance

NISA published a statement on 2 September 2021 claiming that Ikran had been handed to Al Shabaab, who they claimed had then killed her, but Al Shabaab denied any involvement.

On 4 September 2021, Prime Minister Mohammed Hussein Roble asked Director General of NISA, Fahad Yasin to submit a report on Ikran's death. Roble suspended Yasin due to his failure to submit the report, but the decision was overturned by President Mohamed Abdullahi Mohamed on the grounds of it being unconstitutional. Roble accused Mohamed of “obstructing effective investigation of Ikran Tahlil Farah’s case”. In a joint statement on 7 September 2021, IGAD, EU, USA, AMISOM and the UN, called for a credible investigation to be made into Ikran's disappearance.

Former NISA director-general Abdullahi Ali Sanbalolshe who originally hired Ikran in 2017 suggested that she may have been targeted due to her possession of sensitive information, suggesting that she had information about the secret deployment of Somali army recruits to Eritrea who may have been sent to Ethiopia to fight in the Tigray War. The Council of Presidential Candidates in Somalia have called for an independent enquiry into the case.

Ikran's mother, Qali Mohamud Guhaad, filed charges at the military court against Fahad Yasin, Abdullahi Kulane, Abdikani Wadna-Qabad and Yasin Faray in relation to the disappearance of her daughter. According to Qali there was an offer of an out of court settlement which was made through Hussein Dhubow and MP Dahir Jesow. Dr Tahlil, Ikran's father who lives in London, responded saying that the family would not accept any such settlement. Mohamed subsequently appointed a commission of inquiry to investigate the disappearance, but Qali dismissed the move.

It is believed that Ikran was in possession of sensitive information relating to the suicide attack which killed her former boss, Abdirahman Osman, and also a secret program in which an estimated 4000-7000 Somali military recruits were sent to train in Eritrea before allegedly being sent to fight in the Tigray War in Ethiopia.

== See also ==
- List of kidnappings
- List of people who disappeared mysteriously (2000–present)
