= Mahdi Mohammed Gulaid =

Prime Minister of Somalia

His Excellency Mahdi Mohammed Gulaid
- Mahdi Maxamed Guuleed مهدي محمد جوليد
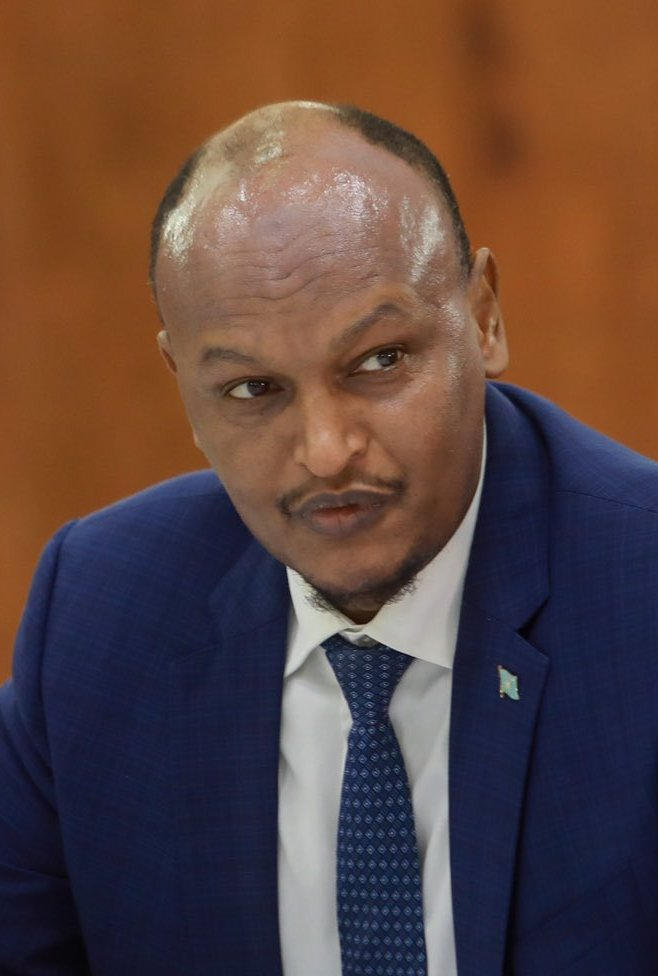

Acting Prime Minister of Somalia
- In office 25 July 2020 – 23 September 2020
- President: Mohamed Abdullahi Mohamed
- Preceded by: Hassan Ali Khaire
- Succeeded by: Mohamed Hussein Roble

Deputy Prime Minister of Somalia
- In office 21 March 2017 – 2 August 2022
- President: Mohamed Abdullahi Mohamed
- Prime Minister: Hassan Ali Khaire
- Preceded by: Mohamed Omar Arte
- Succeeded by: Salah Ahmed Jama

Personal details
- Born: Mahdi Mohammed Gulaid Aware, Ethiopia
- Party: Independent
- Children: 7

Mahdi Mohammed Gulaid "Khadar" (Somali: Mahdi Maxamed Guleed "Khadar", Arabic: مهدي محمد جوليد خضر) is a Somali politician who was the former deputy Prime Minister of the Federal Republic of Somalia, from 2017 to 2022 and briefly served as the acting Prime Minister of the Federal Republic of Somalia from 25 July 2020 to 23 September 2020.

== Career ==
=== Early career ===
Prior to taking office, he practised law in Somaliland and has worked with the second Electoral Commission of Somaliland as legal advisor.

=== Deputy Prime Minister of Somalia ===
As a deputy prime minister Gulaid also chaired Strand 4 of Somalia's National Security Architecture including the prevention and countering of violent extremism. Most recently, he co-chaired the Somalia Partnership Forum in Brussels which concluded with resounding success.

Political offices
Preceded by Hassan Ali Khaire	Acting Prime Minister of Somalia; 2020	Succeeded by Mohamed Hussein Roble
