= Abdiwahid Gonjeh =

Somali politician

Abdiwahid Elmi Gonjeh عبدالواحد عبدي علمي غونجاه
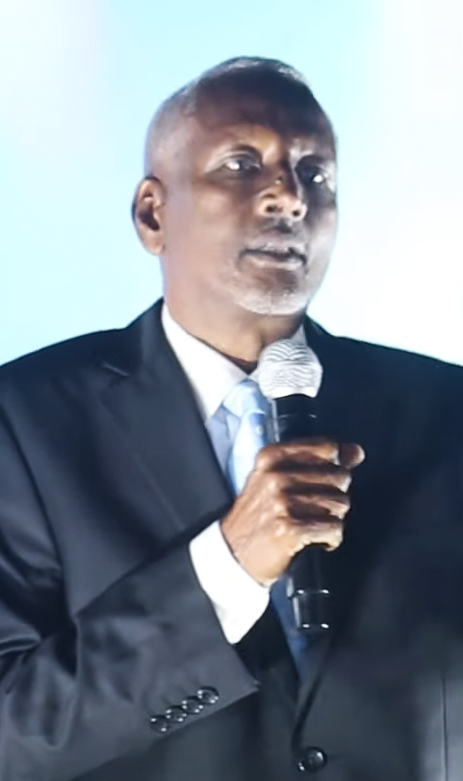

Prime Minister of Somalia Acting
- In office 24 September 2010 – 31 October 2010
- President: Sharif Sheikh Ahmed
- Preceded by: Omar Abdirashid Ali Sharmarke
- Succeeded by: Mohamed Abdullahi Farmajo Current position =Senator of Upper house Somali government

Personal details
- Born: Dusamareeb galgaduud somalia
- Party: Transitional Federal Government

Abdiwahid Elmi Gonjeh (Somali: Cabdiwaahid Elmi Goonjeex, Arabic: وحيد عبدي علمي غونجاه), popularly known as Abdiwahid Gonjeh, is a Somali politician. He is currently a Senator of upper house of the Federal Parliament representing Galgaduud region, Abudwak District. From September through October 2010, he was the acting Prime Minister of Somalia, a post he inherited from Omar Abdirashid Ali Sharmarke. Prior to his appointment, Gonjeh had been the Deputy Prime Minister and federal Minister for Transport.

He hails from the Darod Marehan subclan. In mid-2012, Gonjeh presented himself as a candidate in Somalia's 2012 presidential elections.

Political offices
Preceded by Omar Abdirashid Ali Sharmarke	Prime Minister of Somalia; Acting; 2010	Succeeded by Mohamed Abdullahi Mohamed
