= Hamza Abdi Barre =

Prime Minister of Somalia since 2022

His Excellency Hamza Abdi Barre
- Xamse Cabdi Barre حمزة عبد بري
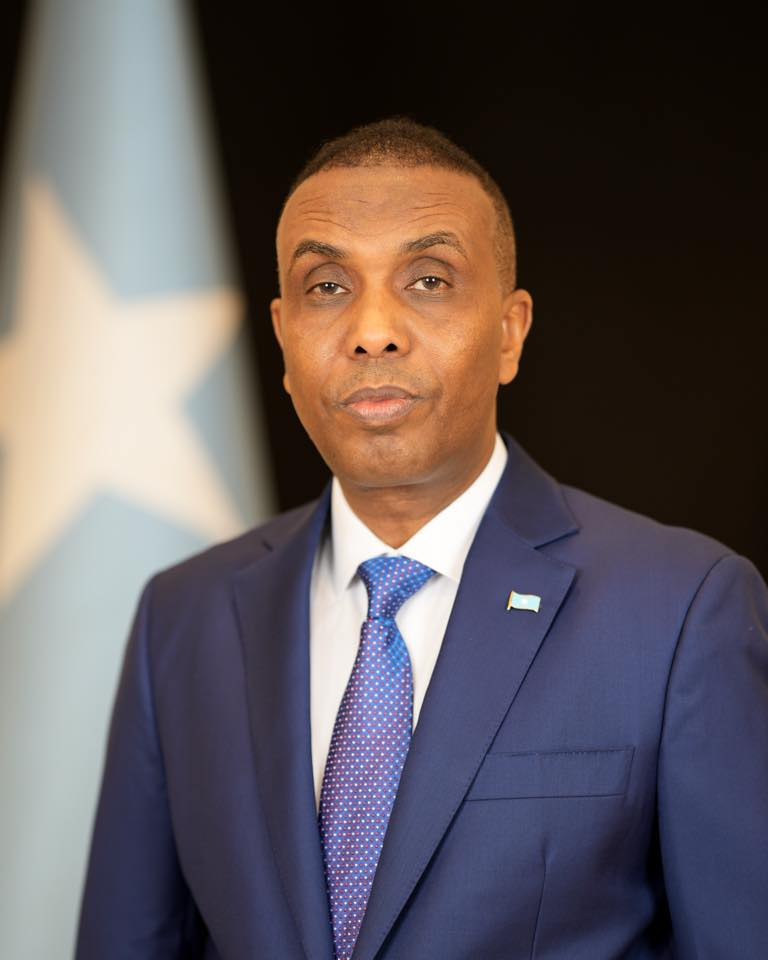
- Official portrait, 2025

21st Prime Minister of Somalia
- Incumbent
- Assumed office 25 June 2022
- President: Hassan Sheikh Mohamud
- Deputy: Salah Jama (since 2022); Jibril Abdirashid Haji Abdi (since 2025)
- Preceded by: Mohamed Hussein Roble

Member of the House of the People
- Incumbent
- Assumed office 28 December 2021
- Constituency: Afmadow, Afmadow District, Lower Juba

Personal details
- Born: 1972 or 1973 (age 53–54) Nogob, Somali Region
- Party: Union for Peace and Development Party (UPD)
- Children: 8
- Education: Bachelor's Degree, Master's Degree

Hamza Abdi Barre (Somali: Xamse Cabdi Barre, Arabic: حمزة عبد بري; born 1972 or 1973) is a Somali politician who has served as the prime minister of Somalia since 2022. He was nominated on 15 June 2022, by President Hassan Sheikh Mohamud, and he was endorsed by parliament on 25 June 2022 (229 in favour, 7 opposed, 1 abstention). Hamza is also a parliamentarian elected to the House of the People of the Federal Parliament of Somalia on 28 December 2021, representing the Afmadow constituency of Middle Juba.

== Early life and education ==
Hamza was born in Nogob, Somali Region, to the Ogaden branch of the Darod clan.

Hamza completed his primary education in the country, and received his bachelor's degree from the University of Science and Technology in Yemen in 2001. From 2003 to 2004, Hamza was the Executive Director of the Formal Private Education Network in Somalia (FPENS), a school in Mogadishu. In August 2005, Hamza became a co-founder of Kismayo University. In 2009, Hamza received his Master's degree from the International Islamic University in Malaysia. After obtaining his Master's degree and before entering into his political career, Hamza spent many years as an educator in Kismayo and Mogadishu, including becoming a senior lecturer at Mogadishu University.

== Political career ==
Hamza has long been a supporter of the Union for Peace and Development Party, holding various positions in the offices of the federal government. From 2014 to 2015, Hamza was the administrative advisor to the governor of Banaadir region and later to the mayor of Mogadishu, Hassan Mohamed Hussein. Hamza also served as a senior adviser to the Ministry of Constitutional Affairs and Federalism. His largest political positions before becoming prime minister were as the secretary-general of the Peace and Development Party under President Mohamud from 2011 to 2017, and as chairman of the Jubbaland Electoral Commission from 2019 to 2020 under President Mohamed Abdullahi Mohamed. Since 25 June 2022, Hamza has served as the Prime Minister of Somalia beside President Mohamud, elected exactly one month prior.

== Controversies ==
Prime Minister Hamza Abdi Barre, who comes from a Muslim background, has sparked several controversies through his comments on Palestine, Israel, and Ukraine.

=== Hamas support ===
On 2 November 2023, during a public address, Hamza expressed strong support for Hamas, describing the group as a liberating group rather than a terrorist organization. (Note: a designation upheld by the U.S., U.K., and other European nations) He condemned Western silence on the Gaza crisis and pledged Somalia's federal government backing for Hamas in Gaza.

He used words viewed as antisemitic when describing Jewish people, referring to them as "children of pigs and dogs." Hamza further called for the elimination of Israelis, comparing Jews to the extremist group Al-Shabaab, which has carried out numerous attacks in Somalia.

We will not accept anything less than a Palestinian state with its capital in Jerusalem

— Hazma Abdi Barre

=== Russian invasion support ===
Hamza also weighed in on the Ukraine war, suggesting that Russia's invasion was justified and dismissing Western claims that it was an assault on democracy.

== See also ==
- Ali Yusuf Hosh

== Notes ==
Political offices
Preceded by Mohamed Hussein Roble	Prime Minister of Somalia; 2022–present	Incumbent
