= Mohamed Hussein Roble =

Former Prime Minister of Somalia (born 1968)

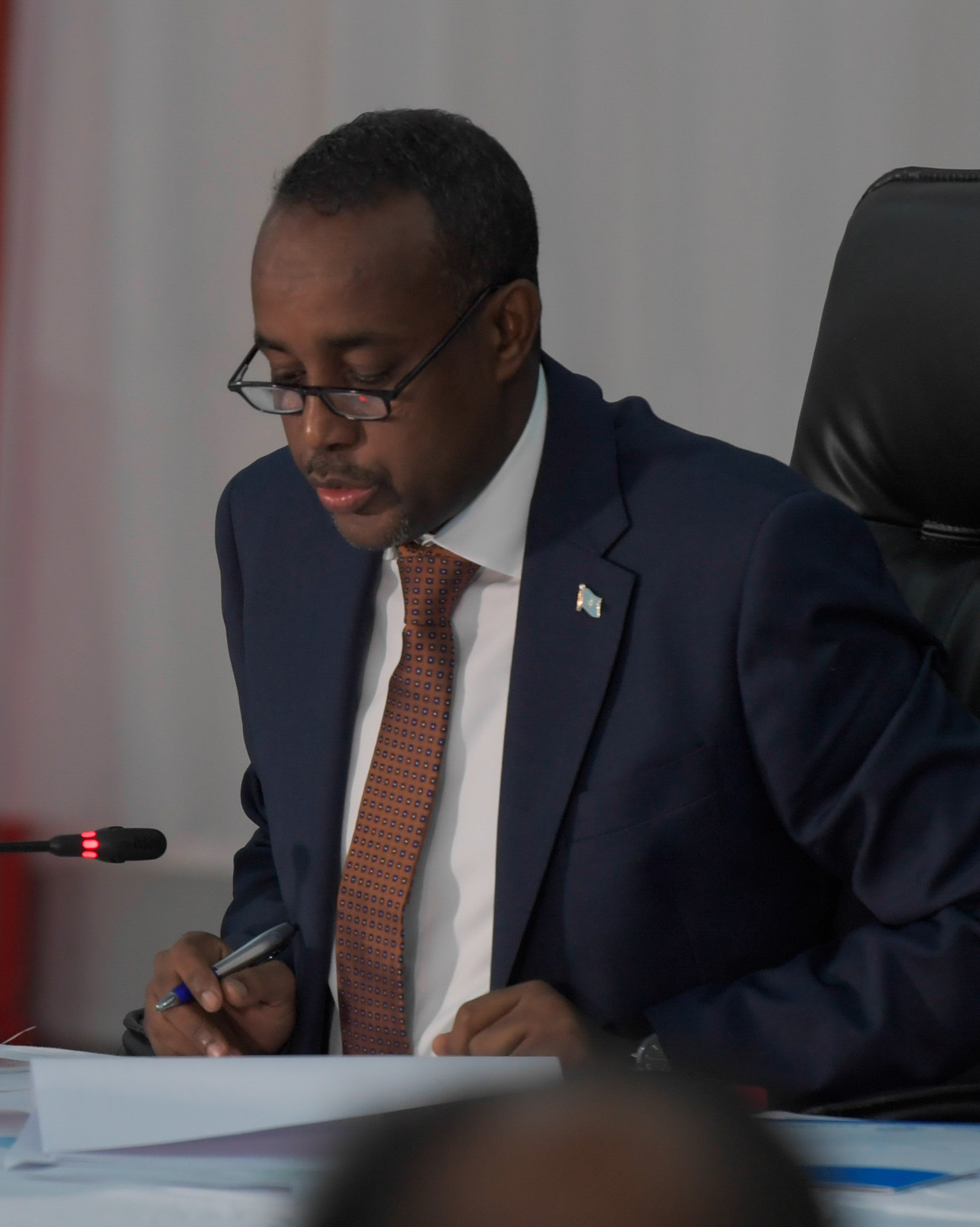

13th Prime Minister of Somalia
- In office 23 September 2020 – 25 June 2022
- President: Mohamed Abdullahi Mohamed; Hassan Sheikh Mohamud
- Preceded by: Mahdi Mohammed Gulaid
- Succeeded by: Hamza Abdi Barre

Personal details
- Born: February 1968 (age 58) Hobyo, Somali Republic
- Citizenship: Somali; Swedish
- Party: Independent
- Education: Somali National University (BSc); KTH Royal Institute of Technology (MEng)

Mohamed Hussein Roble (Somali: Maxamed Xuseen Rooble; born February 1968) is a Somali politician who was the prime minister of Somalia from 23 September 2020 to 25 June 2022.

== Background ==
He was born in Hobyo in February 1968. He received a BSc in civil engineering from the Somali National University, and later attended the KTH Royal Institute of Technology in Stockholm, Sweden, where he completed an MA in environmental engineering and sustainable engineering. Before his appointment as prime minister, he served as an NGO worker and as a technical advisor for engineering at International Labour Organization.

== Political career ==
=== Appointment as prime minister ===
He was appointed to the post of prime minister by Mohamed Abdullahi Mohamed in September 2020. In his initial address to parliament after taking office, he pledged to form a cabinet which would steer Somalia through the 2021 election transition. Roble re-appointed Khadar Mohamed Gulaid as deputy prime minister and he appointed 26 ministers to his cabinet, 15 of whom are from the previous cabinet. The new cabinet includes 17 state ministers, and 4 women.

=== 2020 Galkayo bombing ===
On December 18, 2020, Roble was due to address a gathering at a stadium in Galkayo. Minutes before his arrival, a suicide bomber blew himself up outside the stadium, killing seven civilians and three soldiers. Roble offered his deepest condolences to the families and friends of the victims and called for unity among the Somali people in the struggle against terrorism to promote peace and development in the country.

=== 2021 elections ===
On 1 May 2021, Roble was given the mandate by the Federal Government of Somalia for overseeing the election process according to the agreement reached on 17 September 2020 by the National Consultative Forum and the Baidoa Framework of 16 February 2021 as well as security arrangements for elections.

=== Freedom of the press ===
On World Press Freedom Day, May 3 2021, Roble congratulated Somali journalists, praising them for their sacrifice, resilience and commitment. He also guaranteed journalists safety and access to information, particularly through the upcoming elections, encouraging them to approach their work with responsibility and professionalism.

=== Tension with President Farmajo ===
In September 2021, Farmajo suspended Roble's executive powers following a row over his suspension of former NISA head Fahad Yasin over the murder investigation of Ikran Tahlil Farah.

On 28 December 2021, Roble called on Farmajo to immediately step aside and concentrate on the campaign trail for the forthcoming elections.

On 10 January, Somali leaders announced they struck a deal to complete parliamentary elections by February 25, after repeated delays that have threatened the stability of the country. The agreement was reached after several days of talks hosted by Roble with state leaders aimed at ending an impasse over the polls.

After President Hassan Sheikh Mohamud began his second term on 15 June 2022, he appointed Hamza Abdi Barre to replace Roble as prime minister. Barre was approved in a vote by the House of the People on 25 June 2022.

== Failed coup attempt ==
The outgoing Somali president, Mohamed Abdullah Farmajo, announced the suspension of the work of the Somali prime minister, which the deputy minister of information described as a failed coup attempt, And called on the US embassy in Somalia today, Monday, to de-escalate tensions in the country. "We 'strongly' urge Somalia's leaders to take immediate steps to de-escalate tensions, refrain from provocative actions and avoid violence," the embassy wrote on Twitter Farmajo issued a number of statements in an attempt to delay the presidential elections, including Royli's seizure of lands. He said it was “unfortunate and disappointing” that naval land property was plundered by senior leaders headed by Prime Minister Mohamed Hussein Roble and that he would not allow such theft. The commander also said he will not stand idly by while the naval forces’ land is looted and added that they recently planned to build offices there.

Political offices
Preceded by Mahdi Mohammed Gulaid (Acting)	Prime Minister of Somalia; 2020–2022	Succeeded by Hamza Abdi Barre
