= Hassan Ali Khaire =

Former prime minister of Somalia

Hassan Ali Khaire Xasan Cali Khayre حسن علي خيري
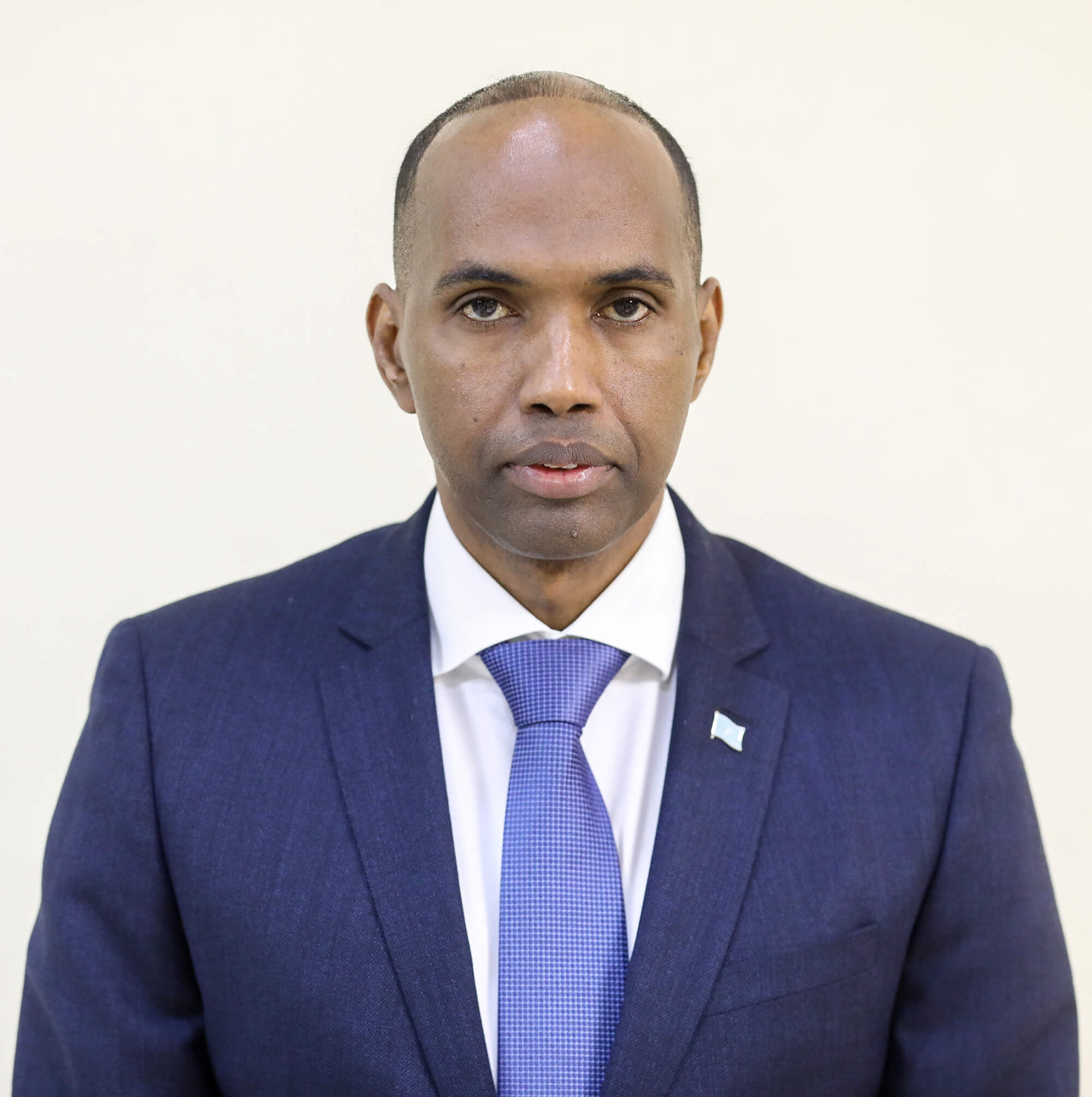
- Official portrait, 2020

Prime Minister of Somalia
- In office 1 March 2017 – 26 July 2020
- President: Mohamed Abdullahi Mohamed
- Preceded by: Omar Sharmarke
- Succeeded by: Mahdi Mohammed Gulaid (acting)

Personal details
- Born: April 1968
- Party: Independent
- Education: University of Oslo; Heriot-Watt University

Mohamed Hassan Ali Khaire (or alternatively transliterated as Hassan Ali Khayre; Somali: Xasan Cali Khayre; Arabic: حسن علي خيري; also popularly known as Hassan Khaire; born April 15, 1968) is a former prime minister of Somalia. He was appointed on 23 February 2017 by President Mohamed Abdullahi Mohamed "Farmaajo" and resigned on 25 July 2020, after MPs passed a disputed vote of no confidence.

Khaire is a former oil executive. He has been a regional director of the Norwegian Refugee Council charity and served as the director of the British oil company Soma Oil and Gas.

== Background ==
=== Early life and education ===
Hassan Ali Khaire was born in the central Somalia town of El Buur on April 15 1968 and moved to Mogadishu when he was 9 months old; he completed his primary and secondary schooling in Mogadishu . At the onset of the civil war, Khaire moved as a refugee to Norway in 1991, where he enrolled at the University of Oslo in 1994.

After graduating in 1998 with a degree in political science and minor in sociology, Khaire went on to complete his MBA at Edinburgh Business School, the graduate business school of Heriot-Watt University, in 2001.

=== Personal life ===
Khaire is a dual citizen of Norway and Somalia.

== Career ==
=== Early career ===
After graduation, Khaire returned to Oslo where he began working with the Norwegian Refugee Council (NRC) in 2002 at their headquarters as a coordinator for their readiness forces.

Khaire briefly left the NGO for a few years to pursue business endeavors but in 2006 he returned to the NRC as an area manager. He remained at the NRC for another nine years as he worked his way up to County Director and eventually the Regional Director for the Horn of Africa.

=== Soma Oil & Gas ===
Khaire joined Soma Oil & Gas as an executive director for Africa; he started in the company at the time of its inception (2013), according to the company's website.

In February 2016, a leaked memo, sent by a United Nations watchdog to diplomats in the United Kingdom and Norway, revealed that the executive director for Africa at Soma Oil and Gas was under investigation by the United Nations Monitoring group for Somalia and Eritrea for possible ties to extremist groups in East Africa, including Al-Shabaab, which had claimed responsibility for a series of deadly terrorist attacks in Somalia. The UN letter, dated 17 February 2016, showed investigators raised concerns over Khaire's possible links to extremist groups after obtaining his "electronic contact list", which it analysed with the cooperation of an unidentified UN member state. They all maintained their innocence from the beginning and were eventually cleared by their accusers after rigorous scrutiny. The UN Somalia Eritrea Monitoring Group (SEMG) said that it "has not found credible evidence of such links and that, in the absence of any new information received by the SEMG clearly demonstrating such links, we now consider this line of inquiry to have reached a conclusion."

Soma has also been under investigation for corruption, but the investigation was dropped because of a lack of evidence, although the investigators maintained that there were still reasons for suspicions.

On 23 February 2017, Soma Oil & Gas announced on their website the resignation of Khaire as the executive director for Africa.

== Prime minister ==
On 23 February 2017, President Mohamed announced on Twitter the appointment of Khaire as the new prime minister of Somalia. Prior to his appointment, Khaire had never held public office, although over the course of his career he had worked with a range of high-level executives and government officials in various capacities.

In a session held on 1 March 2017, the members of the parliament approved Khaire's appointment as prime minister; 231 of the MPs endorsed the selection. On 21 March 2017, Khaire thanked lawmakers for their overwhelming support and submitted his nomination for the Cabinet of Somalia, and on 29 March 2017 it was approved by the parliament.

He also vowed to tackle corruption by prosecuting individuals involved, regardless of their position. He chaired his first Cabinet meeting and reminded the gathered Ministers of his and their duties as statesmen, noting that the administration's focus should be on strengthening the security sector and accelerating institutional reform. Some regional governments, however, accused Khaire of disregarding the federal constitution.

=== Resignation ===
On 25 July 2020, the Speaker of the House of the People of the Federal Parliament, Mohamed Mursal, announced in a press statement that 170 MPs had withdrawn confidence in Khaire's government, accusing the Prime Minister of failing to deliver promises including improving the national security and implementing a timely one person, one vote election. Members of the cabinet, however, disputed the legality of the motion and accused the Speaker of failing to respect the parliamentary rule of procedure. The Embassy of the United States in Somalia expressed concern over the "irregularities" of the voting process and the High Representative of the European Union, Josep Borrell, released a statement regretting that the motion of no-confidence did not meet the constitutional requirements.

At the time of the parliament motion, Khaire was in Dhuusamareeb, Galmudug, where he attended a federal government and Federal Member States talks over national elections. After his return to Mogadishu, he released a short statement calling the process of the motion of no-confidence unconstitutional and offering his resignation to "set a good example in leadership" and to ease the tensions.

Political offices
Preceded by Omar Abdirashid Ali Sharmarke	Prime Minister of Somalia; 2017–2020	Succeeded by Mahdi Mohammed Gulaid; Acting
