= List of prime ministers of Somalia =

Prime Minister of the Federal Republic of Somalia
- Ra'iisul wasaaraha Jamhuuriyadda Federaalka Soomaaliyeed
- Coat of arms of Somalia

- Flag of Somalia

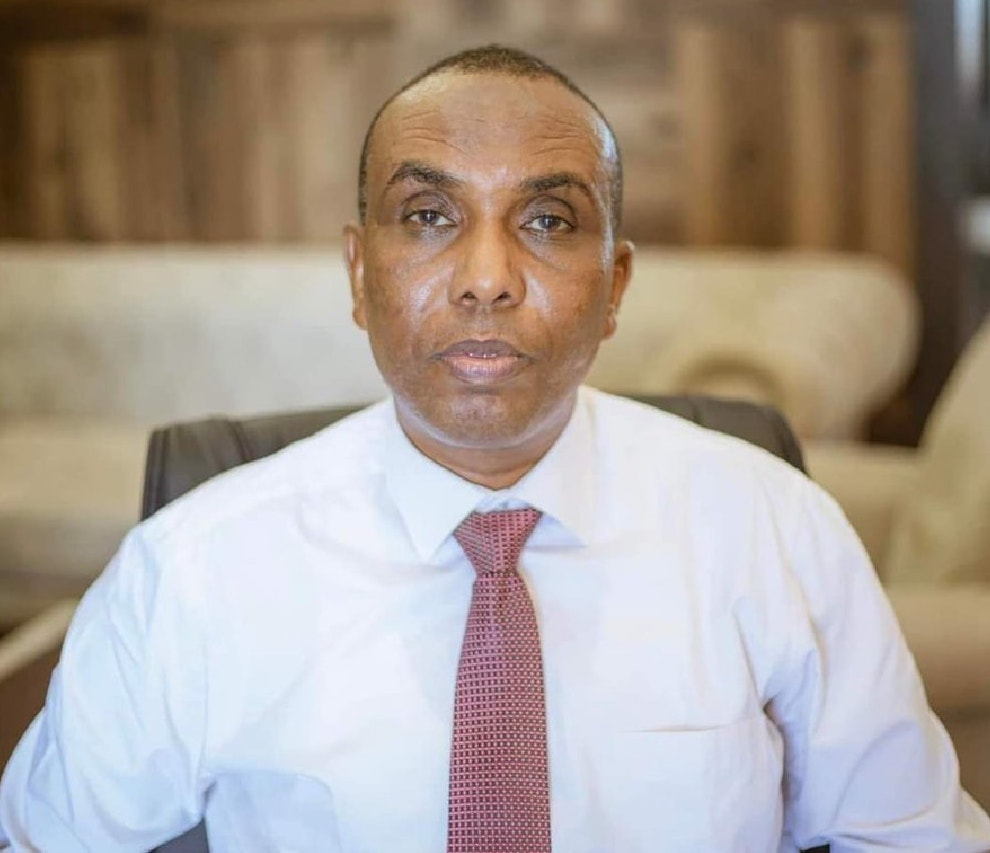
- Incumbent; Hamza Abdi Barre since 25 June 2022
- Federal Government of Somalia; Council of Ministers of Somalia
- Style: Mr. Prime Minister (informal); His Excellency (diplomatic)
- Status: Head of government
- Abbreviation: RW (Somali); PM (English)
- Reports to: President of Somalia; Federal Parliament of Somalia
- Seat: Mogadishu
- Appointer: President (with the approval of the parliament of Somalia)
- Term length: No term limit
- Constituting instrument: Constitution of Somalia
- Inaugural holder: Abdullahi Issa
- Formation: 29 February 1956
- Deputy: Deputy Prime Minister of Somalia
- Salary: US$175,000 annually (2023)
- Website: opm.gov.so

The prime minister of Somalia (Somali: Ra'iisul wasaaraha Soomaaliya) is the head of government of Somalia. There have been 22 official prime ministers since the office was created in 1956. The first prime minister was Abdullahi Issa, who served prior to independence in the Trust Territory of Somaliland. The current prime minister of the Federal Republic of Somalia is Hamza Abdi Barre, approved by the House of the People on 25 June 2022.

== List of officeholders ==
No.	Portrait	Name (Birth–Death)	Term of office			Political party	Election
No.	Portrait	Name (Birth–Death)	Took office	Left office	Time in office	Political party	Election
• Trust Territory of Somaliland (1956–1960) •
—	Abdullahi Issa	Abdullahi Issa (1921–1988)	29 February 1956	1 July 1960	4 years, 123 days	SYL	1956; 1959
• Somali Republic (1960–1969) •
1	Muhammad Haji Ibrahim Egal	Muhammad Haji Ibrahim Egal (1928–2002)	1 July 1960	12 July 1960	11 days	SYL	—
2	Abdirashid Shermarke	Abdirashid Shermarke (1919–1969)	12 July 1960	14 June 1964	3 years, 338 days	SYL	—
3	Abdirizak Haji Hussein	Abdirizak Haji Hussein (1924–2014)	14 June 1964	15 July 1967	3 years, 31 days	SYL	1964
4	Muhammad Haji Ibrahim Egal	Muhammad Haji Ibrahim Egal (1928–2002)	15 July 1967	21 October 1969 (Deposed in a coup)	2 years, 98 days	SYL	1969
• Somali Democratic Republic (1969–1991) •
Post Abolished (21 October 1969 – 1 February 1987)
5	Mohammad Ali Samatar	Mohammad Ali Samatar (1931–2016)	1 February 1987	3 September 1990	3 years, 214 days	SRSP	—
6	Hawadle Madar	Hawadle Madar (1939–2005)	3 September 1990	24 January 1991 (Deposed in rebellion)	143 days	SRSP	—
• Interim Government of Somalia (1991–1997) •
7	Umar Ghalib	Umar Ghalib (1930–2020) (Note: From November 1991 to 2000, there was no recognized central government. The southern part of the country was controlled by different faction leaders; notably General Mohamed Farrah Aidid, who claimed to be President from 15 June 1995 to his death on 1 August 1996, followed by his son Hussein Farrah Aidid from 4 August 1996 to 20 March 1998. Decentralization took place in other areas, characterized by a return to customary and religious law in many places as well as the establishment of autonomous regional governments in the northern part of the country.)	24 January 1991	May 1993 (De facto to 3 January 1997)	5 years, 345 days	USC	—
Vacant (May 1993 – 8 October 2000)
• Transitional National Government of Somalia (2000–2004) •
8	Ali Khalif Galaydh	Ali Khalif Galaydh (1941–2020)	8 October 2000	28 October 2001	1 year, 20 days	Independent	—
—	Osman Jama Ali	Osman Jama Ali (born 1941); Acting	28 October 2001	12 November 2001	15 days	Independent	—
9	Hassan Abshir Farah	Hassan Abshir Farah (1945–2020)	12 November 2001	8 November 2003	1 year, 361 days	Independent	—
10	Muhammad Abdi Yusuf	Muhammad Abdi Yusuf (born 1941)	8 November 2003	1 November 2004	359 days	Independent	—
• Transitional Federal Government of Somalia (2004–2012) •
11	Ali Mohammed Ghedi	Ali Mohammed Ghedi (born 1952)	1 November 2004	29 October 2007 (Resigned)	2 years, 362 days	Independent	—
—	Salim Aliyow Ibrow	Salim Aliyow Ibrow (born 1942); Acting	29 October 2007	24 November 2007	26 days	Independent	—
12	Nur Hassan Hussein	Nur Hassan Hussein (1938–2020)	24 November 2007	14 February 2009	1 year, 82 days	Independent	—
13	Omar Sharmarke	Omar Sharmarke (born 1960)	14 February 2009	24 September 2010	1 year, 222 days	Independent	—
—	Abdiwahid Gonjeh	Abdiwahid Gonjeh (born 1962); Acting	24 September 2010	1 November 2010	38 days	Independent	—
14	Mohamed Abdullahi Mohamed	Mohamed Abdullahi Mohamed (born 1962)	1 November 2010	19 June 2011	230 days	Independent	—
15	Abdiweli Gaas	Abdiweli Gaas (born 1965)	19 June 2011	20 August 2012	1 year, 62 days	Independent	—
• Federal Republic of Somalia (2012–present) •
—	Abdiweli Gaas	Abdiweli Gaas (born 1965); Acting	20 August 2012	17 October 2012	58 days	Independent	—
16	Abdi Farah Shirdon	Abdi Farah Shirdon (born 1958)	17 October 2012	21 December 2013	1 year, 65 days	Independent	—
17	Abdiweli Sheikh Ahmed	Abdiweli Sheikh Ahmed (born 1959)	21 December 2013	24 December 2014	1 year, 3 days	Independent	—
18	Omar Sharmarke	Omar Sharmarke (born 1960)	24 December 2014	1 March 2017	2 years, 67 days	Independent	2016
19	Hassan Ali Khaire	Hassan Ali Khaire (born 1968)	1 March 2017	25 July 2020	3 years, 146 days	Independent	—
—	Mahdi Mohammed Gulaid	Mahdi Mohammed Gulaid (born 1973); Acting	25 July 2020	23 September 2020	60 days	Independent	—
20	Mohamed Hussein Roble	Mohamed Hussein Roble (born 1963)	23 September 2020	25 June 2022	1 year, 276 days	Independent	—
21	Hamza Abdi Barre	Hamza Abdi Barre (born 1974)	25 June 2022	Incumbent	4 years, 76 days	UPD	2021–22

Somali prime ministers are given a new number even when they are reappointed. For example, former prime minister Omar Sharmarke wrote on his Twitter page, "13th and 18th Prime Minister of Somalia." The seat had long been vacant since Umar Ghalib stepped down as prime minister, but Ali Khalif Galaydh became the eighth in August 2000. The acting prime minister is not numbered. For example, Osman Jama Ali was acting prime minister between Ali Khalif Galaydh, the eighth, and Hassan Abshir Farah, the ninth, he didn't get a number. In June 2022, Hamza Abdi Barre succeeded the 20th Mohamed Hussein Roble as the 21st Prime Minister.

== See also ==
- History of Somalia
- Politics of Somalia
- List of colonial governors of British Somaliland
- List of colonial governors of Italian Somaliland
- President of Somalia
  - List of presidents of Somalia
- List of speakers of the Parliament of Somalia
