= Federal Government of Somalia =

Internationally recognised government of Somalia

- Coat of arms of Somalia
- Formation: 20 August 2012; 14 years ago
- Founding document: Constitution of Somalia
- Jurisdiction: Somalia
- Website: www.somalia.gov.so

Legislative branch
- Legislature: Federal Parliament

Executive branch
- Leader: Prime minister of Somalia
- Appointer: President of Somalia
- Headquarters: Villa Somalia

Judicial branch
- Seat: Mogadishu

The Federal Government of Somalia (FGS; Somali: Dowladda Federaalka Soomaaliya, DFS; Arabic: الحكومة الفيدرالية الصومالية) is the internationally recognised government of Somalia, and the longest running attempt to create a central government in Somalia since the collapse of the Somali Democratic Republic in 1991. It replaced the Transitional Federal Government (TFG) of Somalia on 20 August 2012 with the adoption of the Constitution of Somalia.

It officially comprises the executive branch of government, with the parliament serving as the legislative branch. It is headed by the president of Somalia, to whom the Council of Ministers reports through the prime minister.

After the collapse of the Somali Democratic Republic in 1991, there were no relations between the government of Somalia and the Somaliland government, which declared itself an independent country.

== Background ==
In 1991, the collapse of the Somali Democratic Republic amid the outbreak of the Somali Civil War left the country without a central government. Over the following decade, numerous attempts to reestablish national governance failed. In 2000, the Transitional National Government (TNG) was established in Djibouti under President Abdiqasim Salad Hassan, marking the first internationally recognized effort to restore central authority. The TNG suffered from severe institutional weaknesses and faced strong opposition from influential external actors, most notably neighboring Ethiopia, which undermined its efforts to assert authority.

In 2004, the Transitional Federal Government (TFG) was formed in Kenya under President Abdullahi Yusuf Ahmed. From its inception, the TFG suffered from endemic corruption, internal divisions, and a lack of governing capacity, relying heavily on external military support—primarily from Ethiopia—for its survival. Ethiopia played a dominant role in shaping and directing the TFG, which contributed to its widespread lack of legitimacy among Somalis. In 2006, Ethiopian forces invaded Somalia to oust the Islamic Courts Union (ICU), which had taken control of most of southern Somalia, including Mogadishu. The TFG was installed in the capital under Ethiopian protection. The ICU subsequently fragmented into various factions, including the Alliance for the Re-liberation of Somalia (ARS) and Al-Shabaab, sparking a protracted insurgency. During the Ethiopian occupation and the subsequent escalation of the insurgency in 2007–2008, the African Union Mission in Somalia (AMISOM) was deployed to bolster the TFG, which remained on the verge of collapse.

By late 2008, most of the country was under insurgent control, and over 80% of TFG security personnel had deserted. A UN-brokered peace agreement between the TFG and the ARS aimed to establish a more inclusive government. President Yusuf resigned and was succeeded by Sharif Sheikh Ahmed, the former ICU chairman and ARS leader. The new administration remained fragile and faced renewed insurgent gains from al-Shabaab and the newly formed Hizbul Islam, nearly collapsing again in 2009 as the Somali Civil War entered a new and intensified phase.

The TFG remained weak and internally fragmented throughout 2009 and 2010, continuing to rely heavily on foreign military support for its survival. Despite persistent governance challenges, a turning point came in 2011 when AMISOM and TFG forces succeeded in expelling insurgent groups from Mogadishu for the first time since the insurgency began in 2007. That same year, a transitional roadmap was adopted. In 2012, President Sharif stepped down, and the TFG’s mandate officially ended with the establishment of the Federal Government of Somalia. Hassan Sheikh Mahmoud won the 2012 Somali presidential election, becoming the first President of the FGS.

== Structure ==
The national constitution lays out the basic way in which the government is to operate. It was passed on June 22, 2012, after several days of deliberation between Somali federal and regional politicians. To come into effect, the constitution must be ratified by the new parliament.

Under the new constitution, Somalia, now officially known as the Federal Republic of Somalia, is a federation.

=== Executive Branch ===
The President is elected by the Parliament. The president serves as the head of state and chooses the Prime Minister, who serves as the head of government and leads the Council of Ministers. According to Article 97 of the constitution, most executive powers of the Somali government are vested in the Council of Ministers. The incumbent President of Somalia is Hassan Sheikh Mohamud. Hamza Abdi Barre is the national Prime Minister.

=== Council of Ministers ===
The Council is formally known as the Council of Ministers of the Federal Government of Somalia but is sometimes referred to as the Cabinet. Its members are appointed by the Prime Minister.

=== Parliament of Somalia ===
The Federal Parliament of Somalia elects the President and Prime Minister and has the authority to pass and veto laws. It is bicameral, and consists of a 275-seat lower house, as well as an upper house, capped at 54 representatives. By law, at least 30% of all MPs must be women. The current Members of parliament were selected by a Technical Selection Committee, which was tasked with vetting potential legislators that were in turn nominated by a National Constituent Assembly consisting of elders. The current Speaker of the Federal Parliament is Aaden Maxamed Nuur.

=== Judiciary ===
The national court structure is organized into three tiers: the Constitutional Court, Federal Government level courts and Federal Member State level courts. A nine-member Judicial Service Commission appoints any Federal tier member of the judiciary. It also selects and presents potential Constitutional Court judges to the House of the People of the Federal Parliament for approval. If endorsed, the President appoints the candidate as a judge of the Constitutional Court. The five-member Constitutional Court adjudicates issues about the constitution, in addition to various Federal and sub-national matters.

=== Federal member states ===
Local state governments, officially recognized as the Federal Member States, have a degree of autonomy over regional affairs and maintain their police and security forces. However, they are constitutionally subject to the authority of the Government of the Federal Republic of Somalia. The national parliament is tasked with selecting the ultimate number and boundaries of the Federal Member States within the Federal Republic of Somalia.

=== Education ===
The Ministry of Education is officially responsible for education in Somalia. As of 24th June 2016, the institution is led by Abdulkadir Abdi Hashi.

=== Healthcare ===
The Ministry of Health heads the country's healthcare system. As of January 2015, the institution is led by Mohamed Xaji Abdinur.

=== Media ===
The federal government has two main media outlets: Radio Mogadishu, the state-run radio station and Somali National Television, the national television channel and Somali national news agency.

=== Identity ===
In March 2023, the federal government established the National Identification and Registration Authority, whose mandates includes developing a National Identification Number, designed to streamline administrative processes, enhance security, and mitigate fraud and corruption by verifying identities in both digital and in-person transactions.

== Military and police ==
The central government's Ministry of Defence is officially responsible for the Somali Armed Forces and its various subdivisions. The Ministry is led by Abdirashid Abdullahi Mohamed.

== Capital ==
The constitution recognizes Mogadishu as the capital of Somalia. The Parliament of Somalia meets in the city, which is also the seat of the nation's Supreme Court. In addition, Mogadishu is the location of the presidential palace, Villa Somalia, where the President resides. The Prime Minister also lives in the city.

== International relations ==
The Federal Government of Somalia is internationally recognized as Somalia's official central government. It occupies the country's seat in the United Nations, the African Union, and the Organisation of Islamic Cooperation (OIC). The Somali federal government has a Permanent Representative and Deputy Permanent Representative to the United Nations. It also has embassies in various countries.

Additionally, there are various foreign diplomatic missions in Somalia. Ethiopia maintains an embassy in Mogadishu, and consulates in Hargeisa in the self-declared Republic of Somaliland and Garowe in Puntland. Djibouti re-opened its embassy in Mogadishu in December 2010. The following year, India also re-opened its embassy in the capital after a twenty-year absence, as did Turkey. Iran and the United Kingdom followed suit in 2013, as well as Qatar and China in 2014. Italy maintains a special diplomatic delegation and a Technical Mission to Mogadishu and is scheduled to re-open its embassy in the city. In 2013, Egypt likewise announced plans to re-open its embassy in Mogadishu.

In January 2013, the United States announced that it was set to exchange diplomatic notes with the new central government of Somalia, re-establishing official ties with the country for the first time in 20 years.

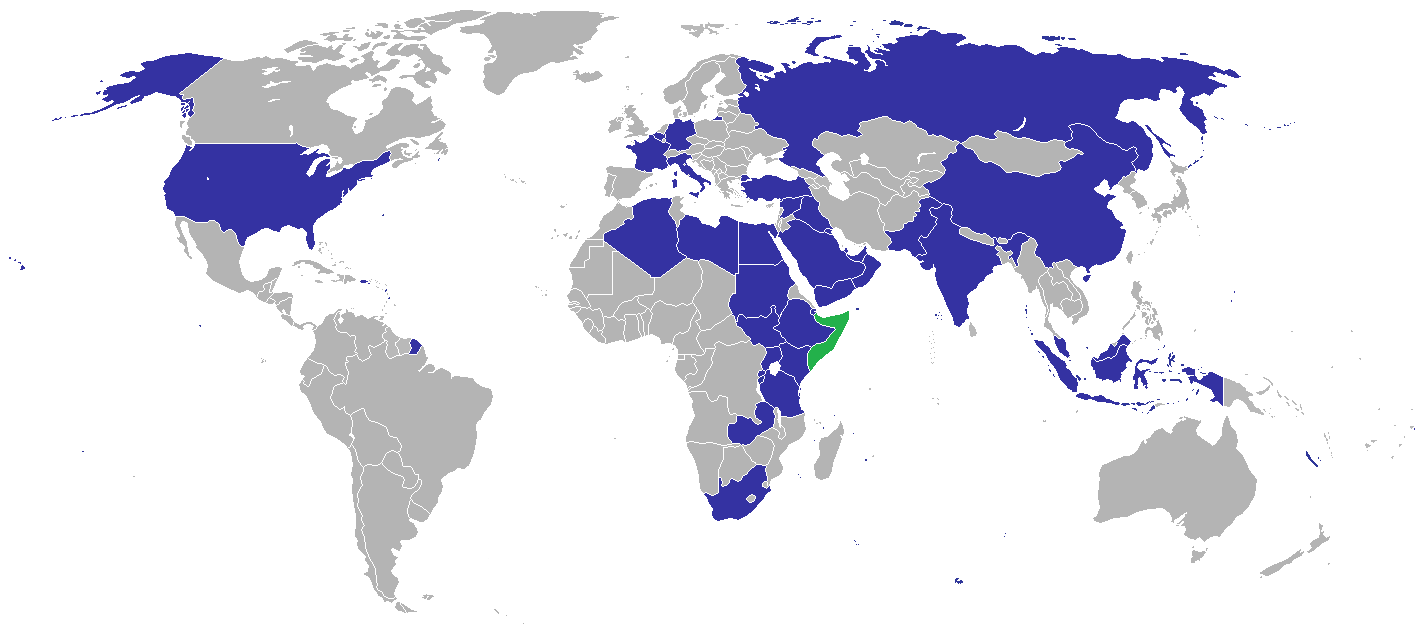
Current diplomatic missions of Somalia Somalia

== Passports ==
For travel, Somali citizens can obtain a Somali passport from government-designated locations or Somali embassies abroad.
