= List of members of the Somali Transitional Federal Parliament =

This is a list of members of the Somali Transitional Federal Parliament. First published on August 29, 2004, the MPs were scheduled to serve until 2009.

== List of selected members of the Transitional Federal Parliament as of August 29, 2004 ==
Number	Member of Parliament	Clan, Faction, Gender, Cabinet Position, Notes
1.	Hon. faid mahamed ali
2.	Hon. Ismail A.rahin Mohamed Ali
3.	Hon. Abdilahi Mohamed Shine
4.	Hon. omar nur gacal
5.	Hon. omar yusuf bariise
6.	Hon. Axmed gacal taako
7.	Hon. khalif axmed gabow
8.	Hon. xaaji gacamey
9.	Hon. muxuyadin yalaxow
10.	Hon. Osman Mohamud Mohamed (Dufle)
11.	Hon. geni omar
12.	Hon. kufra feeleey
13.	Hon. Abdalla Derow Isak
14.	Hon. Abdalla Haji Ali
15.	Hon. Abdi Abdulle Saeed
16.	Hon. Abdi Ahmed Dhuhulow
17.	Hon. Abdi Bulle Hussein
18.	Hon. Abdi Haji Yaris
19.	Hon. Abdi Harshi Abdillahi
20.	Hon. Abdi Mohamed Tarrah
21.	Hon. Abdi Warsame Isak
22.	Hon. Abdiaziz Abdullahi Mohamed
23.	Hon. Abdiazis Ibrahim Osman
24.	Hon. Abdiaziz Shekh Yusuf
25.	Hon. Abdikafi Moalin Hassan
26.	Hon. Abdikarim Ahmed Ali
27.	Hon. Abdillahi Ahmed Abdille
28.	Hon. Abdirahaman Jama Abdalla
29.	Hon. Abdirahman Abdi Warre
30.	Hon. Abdirahman Haji Ismail
31.	Hon. Abdirahman Mohamud Ali
32.	Hon. Abdirahman Osman Dirir
33.	Hon. Abdirashid Mohamed Hidig
34.	Hon. Abdirizak Issak Bihi
35.	Hon. Abdiwali Ibrahim Muday
36.	Hon Abdiwali Sh Maxamed
37.	Hon. Abdow Maax Farah
38.	Hon. Abdukadir Aden Jibar
39.	Hon. Abdulahi Aden Ahmed (Black)
40.	Hon. Abdulahi Aden Ali (Shaletey)
41.	Hon. Abdulfatah Ibrahim Rashid
42.	Hon. Abdulkadir Haji Mohamoud Dakane
43.	Hon. Abdulkadir Mohamed Haji
44.	Hon. Abdulkadir Nur Arale (urjufle)
45.	Hon. Abdulkadir Osman Wehli
46.	Hon. Abdulkadir Sheikh Mohamed Nur
47.	Hon. Abdulahi Bille Nour
48.	Hon. Abdullahi Ahmed Afrah (Jaangoow)
49.	Hon. Abdullahi Gedi Shador
50.	Hon. Abdullahi Moalim Mohamed ‘Fah’
51.	Hon. Abdullahi Sheikh Ismail
52.	Hon. Said Mohamed Addo
53.	Hon. Abdulrahman Yusuf Diriye
54.	Hon. Abdurahman Aden Ibrahim ‘Ibbi’
55.	Hon. Adan Abdullahi Diriye (Mafadhiiste)
56.	Hon. Aden Mohamed Ali
57.	Hon. Aden Mohamud Mohamed (Fero)
58.	Hon. Adil Sheegow Sagar
59.	Hon. Ahmed Abdi Omar
60.	Hon. Ahmed Abdillahi Jama (Dakir)
61.	Hon. Ahmed Abdorahman Mohamed
62.	Hon. Ahmed Dhimbil Robleh (Koba Weeyne)
63.	Hon. Ahmed Diriye Mohamed (Dhaadhaan) M
64.	Hon. Ahmed Duale Gelle (Haaf)
65.	Hon. Ahmed Hashi Mohamoud (Hashiis)
66.	Hon. Ahmed Issa Awale (Ishabaydhabo)
67.	Hon. Ahmed Mohamed Abdi (Ahmedtaw)
68.	Hon. Ahmed Ismail Jumale
69.	Hon. Ahmed Mohamed Suleiman
70.	Hon. Ahmed Mohammed Samar
71.	Hon. Ahmed Nur Sheikh ‘Lohos’
72.	Hon. Ahmed Omar Gagale
73.	Hon. Ahmed Shariff Mohamed Sidi
74.	Hon. Ahmed Sheik Abdirahman
75.	Hon. Ali Mumin Ismail
76.	Hon. Ali Aden Hussein (Eylow)
77.	Hon. Ali Ahmed Jama
78.	Hon. Ali Alas Qareey
79.	Hon. Ali Haji Mohamoud ‘Ali-Bash’
80.	Hon. Ali Hassan Guyow
81.	Hon. Ali Ismail Abdi-ger
82.	Hon. Ali Jeyte Osman
83.	Hon. Ali Mohamed Faqay	Chairman and Political Leader of the Bravanese people, Minister of State, Transitional Federal Government of the Somali Republic.
84.	Hon. Ali Mohamoud Abdi
85.	Hon. Ali Osman Jidow
86.	Hon. Ali Sheikh Mohamed Nur
87.	Hon. Ali-Bashi Haji
88.	Hon. Amina Mohamed Mursal
89.	Hon. Amir Ahmed Mohamed
90.	Hon. Asha Abdalla
91.	Hon. Asha Abdi Sheikh
92.	Hon. Asha Abdullahi Isse
93.	Hon. Asha Haji Elmi
94.	Hon. Avv. Ahmed Ibrahim Mohamed
95.	Hon. Awad Ahmed Ashara
96.	Hon. Barre Aden Shire
97.	Hon. Bashir Mohamed Aden
98.	Hon. Botan Isse Alin
99.	Hon. Cabdi Cumar Axmed (Abdi Omar Ahmed)
100.	Hon. Cisman Cilmi Boqoreh
101.	Hon. Dahir Haji Khalif
102.	Hon. Deqa Olujog Jama
103.	Hon. Fadumo Hassan Ali
104.	Hon. Fahma Ahmed Nur
105.	Hon. Faisal Omer Gulaid
106.	Hon. Farah Hassan Mohamed
107.	Hon. Farahan Ali Mohamoud
108.	Hon. Fatuma Dahir Adan
109.	Hon. Fowsiya Mohamed Sheikh Hasan
110.	Hon. Gelle Mohamed Adan
112.	Hon. Haji Adam Hussein
113.	Hon. Hassan Abdi Guure
114.	Hon. Hassan Abdi Hirey
115.	Hon. Hassan Abdunur Aden (Albera)
116.	Hon. Hassan Abshir Farah
117.	Hon. Hassan Ahmed Jama
118.	Hon. Hassan Burale Mohamed
119.	Hon. Hassan Dhimbil Wasame
120.	Hon. Hassan Ibrahim Mohamed
121.	Hon. Hassan Isak Yaqub ‘Ges Adde’
122.	Hon. Hassan Moallin Hussein
123.	Hon. Hassan Mohamed Idiris
124.	Hon. Hassan Mohamed Nur (Sharti gadud)
125.	Hon. Hassan Omar Hussein
126.	Hon. Hassan Omar Mohamed
127.	Hon. Hawa Abdillahi Qayad
128.	Hon. Hiddo Farah Abdi
129.	Hon. Hilowle Iman Omar
130.	Hon. Hirsi Bulhan Farah
131.	Hon. Hussein Abdi Mohamed
132.	Hon. Hussein Abdisalan Mohamed
133.	Hon. Hussein Addawe Badow
134.	Hon. Hussein Arale Addan
135.	Hon. Hussein Elabe Faahiye
136.	Hon. Hussein Mohamed Jama Keynan
137.	Hon. Hussein Mohammud Muse ‘Bantu’
138.	Hon. Hussein Mohamud Sheikh Hussein
139.	Hon. Hussein Osman Hussein
140.	Hon. Ibrahim Abdulahi Osman (Garabey)
141.	Hon. Ibrahim Aden Hassan (Kiish)
142.	Hon. Ibrahim Habeeb Noor
143.	Hon. Ibrahim Hussein Ali Salah
144.	Hon. Ibrahim Isak Aymow (Jarere)
145.	Hon. Ibrahim Isak Yarow
146.	Hon. Ibrahim Mohamed Deeq
147.	Hon. Ibrahim Mohamed Isak (Ibrow)
148.	Hon. Ibrahim Shaikh Ali Mohamed
149.	Hon. Ing. Nur Wabar Abdi
150.	Hon. Isak Mohamed Nur
151.	Hon. Isak Mohamud Mohamed
152.	Hon. Ismail Hassan Farah
153.	Hon. Ismail Hassan Jama
154.	Hon. Ismail Hassan Mohamoud
155.	Hon. Ismail Mohamoud Hure
156.	Hon. Ismail Qasim Naji
157.	Hon. Isse Weheliye Malin
158.	Hon. Jama Abdillahi Ofleh
159.	Hon. Jama Ali Jama
160.	Hon. Jama Gure Qobey
161.	Hon. Jamal Hassan Mohamed
162.	Hon. Jeylani Ali Kediye
163.	Hon. Jibril Mohamed Sheikh Osman
164.	Hon. Khadija Mohamed Diriye
165.	Hon. Khalid Omar Ali
166.	Hon. Lul Abdi Aden
167.	Hon. Mahad Aabdalle Aawed
168.	Hon. Mahamud Abdi Hassan (Begos)
169.	Hon. Mariam Arif Qassim
170.	Hon. Maulid Ma’ane Mohamud
171.	Hon. Maxamed Abdillahi Kamil
172.	Hon. Maxamed Cali Xagaa
173.	Hon. Maxmed Cali Daheye
174.	Hon. Mire Hagi Farah Mohamed
175.	Hon. Moalin Mohamud Mohamed (Jiis)
176.	Hon. Moalin Nur Hassan
177.	Hon. Modobe Nunow Mohamed
178.	Hon. Mohamed Abdi Awad
179.	Hon. Mohamed Abdi Hayer
180.	Hon. Mohamed Abdi Yussuf
181.	Hon. Mohamed Aden Wayel
182.	Hon. Mohamed Ahmed Kulan
183.	Hon. Mohamed Ali Bilaal
184.	Hon. Mohamed Ali Shiriye
185.	Hon. Mohamed Diriye Ali
186.	Hon. Mohamed Hashi Gaani
187.	Hon. Mohamed Hassan Faqi
188.	Hon. Mohamed Hassan Ibrahim
189.	Hon. Mohamed Hussein Addo
190.	Hon. Mohamed Hussein Isak
191.	Hon. Mohamed Hussein Rage
192.	Hon. Mohamed Ibrahim Mohamed (Habsade)
193.	Hon. Mohamed Ismail Barkale	Elder of the Bajuni people, Petitioner to I.G.A.D. (Africa's Intergovernmental Authority on Development) on Tribal Rights.
194.	Hon. Mohamed Jama Furuh
195.	Hon. Mohamed Maalim Abdirahman
196.	Hon. Mohamed Mohamoud Aden
197.	Hon. Mohamed Mohamud Guled (Gamadere)	Formerly the Minister of Public Works and Housing; as of February 7, 2007, Minister of the Interior.
198.	Hon. Mohamed Mursal Borrow
199.	Hon. Mohamed Nurani Bakar
200.	Hon. Mohamed Omar Habeb (M. Dhere)
201.	Hon. Mohamed Osman Bulbul
202.	Hon. Mohamed Osman Isak (Fanah)
203.	Hon. Mohamed Osman Maye
204.	Hon. Mohamed Osman Mostaro
205.	Hon. Mohamed Qanyare Afrah
206.	Hon. Mohamed Sh. Nageye
207.	Hon. Mohamed Sheikh Ahmed Gabyo
208.	Hon. Mohamed Shiekh Isak (Abadir)
209.	Hon. Mohammed Hassan Ali Daryeel
210.	Hon. Mohamoud Ahmed M. Kulalihi
211.	Hon. Mohamoud Mohamed Hassan
212.	Hon. Mohamud Sayed Aden
213.	Hon. Mohamud Abdillahi Jama
214.	Hon. Mohamud Barre Hussein
215.	Hon. Mohamuud Salad Noor
216.	Hon. Mukhtar Mohamed Yusuf
217.	Hon. Mumin Ibrahim Isak
218	Hon. Muna Ibrahim Abikar
219	Hon. Munye Said Omar
220	Hon. Muqtar Munye Bishar
221	Hon. Musa Nur Amin	Minister of Internal Affairs
222	Hon. Muse Ali Omar
223	Hon. Muse Hersi Fahiye
224	Hon. Muse Sudi Yalahow
225	Hon. Mustafa Sheikh Ali Duhulow
226	Hon. Nur Ahmed Dirshe
227	Hon. Nur Matan Abdi
228	Hon. Nur Sheikh Hussein Addo
229	Hon. Omar Aden Hassan
230	Hon. Omar Ahmed Jess
231	Hon.Omar Hashi Adan
232	Hon. Omar Islaw Mohamed
233	Hon. Omar Mohamud Mohamed (Filish)
234	Hon. Omar Ugas Mumin
235	Hon. Omer Hassan Subeir
236	Hon. Osman Adan Dhubow
237	Hon. Osman Hassan Ali Ato
238	Hon. Osman Liban Ibrahim
239	Hon. Osman Muqtar Mohamed (Mirow)
240	Hon. Qamar Adan Ali Abdalla
241	Hon. Rashid Adan Abdullahi ‘Gebyow’
242	Hon.Sead Hassan Shire	Warsangali/Dubays
243	Hon. Saeed Mohamed Rage
244	Hon. Sahra Abdulkadir Abdirahman
245	Hon. Salad Ali Jelle
246	Hon. Salah Ali Farah
247	Hon. Salah Ismail Saqawe
248	Hon. Salim Aliyow Ibrow
249	Hon. Saredo Mohamed Abdalla
250	Hon. Sharif Hassan Sheikh Aden
251	Hon. Sharif Safi Roble
252	Hon. Sharif Salah Mohamed Ali
253	Hon. Sheikh Adan Mohamed Nur (Madobe)	First Deputy Chairman of RRA
254	Hon. Sheikh Aden Moalin Isak
255	Hon. Sheikh Aden Sheikh Mohamed Der
256	Hon. Sheikh Hassan Bile
257	Hon. Sheikh Jama Haji Hussein
258	Hon. Sheikh Nur Ali Aden
259	Hon. Suleyman Olad Roble
260	Hon. Surie Dirie Arab
260.	Hon. Xirsi Adan Rooble Afrax
262	Hon. Yussuf Mahamed Harare
263	Hon. Yusuf Abdillahi Kahin
264	Hon. Yusuf Gelle Ugas
265	Hon. Yusuf Hassan Iibrahim
266	Hon. Yusuf Mire Mohamoud "Serar"
267	Hon. Yusuf Mohamed Abduqadir
268	Hon. Yusuf Mohamed Kahair
269	Hon. Zakariye Xuseen Areh
270	Hon. Zakia Abdissalam Alim
272	Hon. Zeinab Maxamed Caamir
274	Hon. Zekaria Mohamoud Haji Abdi
275	Hussein Mohamed Farah Aidid
276	Ibrahin Abdi Nur
277.	Mohamed Mohamoud Haid
278	Mohamed Ahmed furre	Ogaden Cowlyahan Reer Cali
279	Serar Ali Muhamud Deria
280	Ali Abdullahi Osoble	Minister of Education, Minister of Planning, Minister of Reconciliation
281	Abdullahi Ali Ahmed Waafow
