= List of leaders of South West State of Somalia =

Leader of the South West State of Somalia
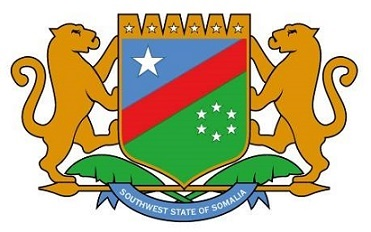
- Coat of arms

- Flag

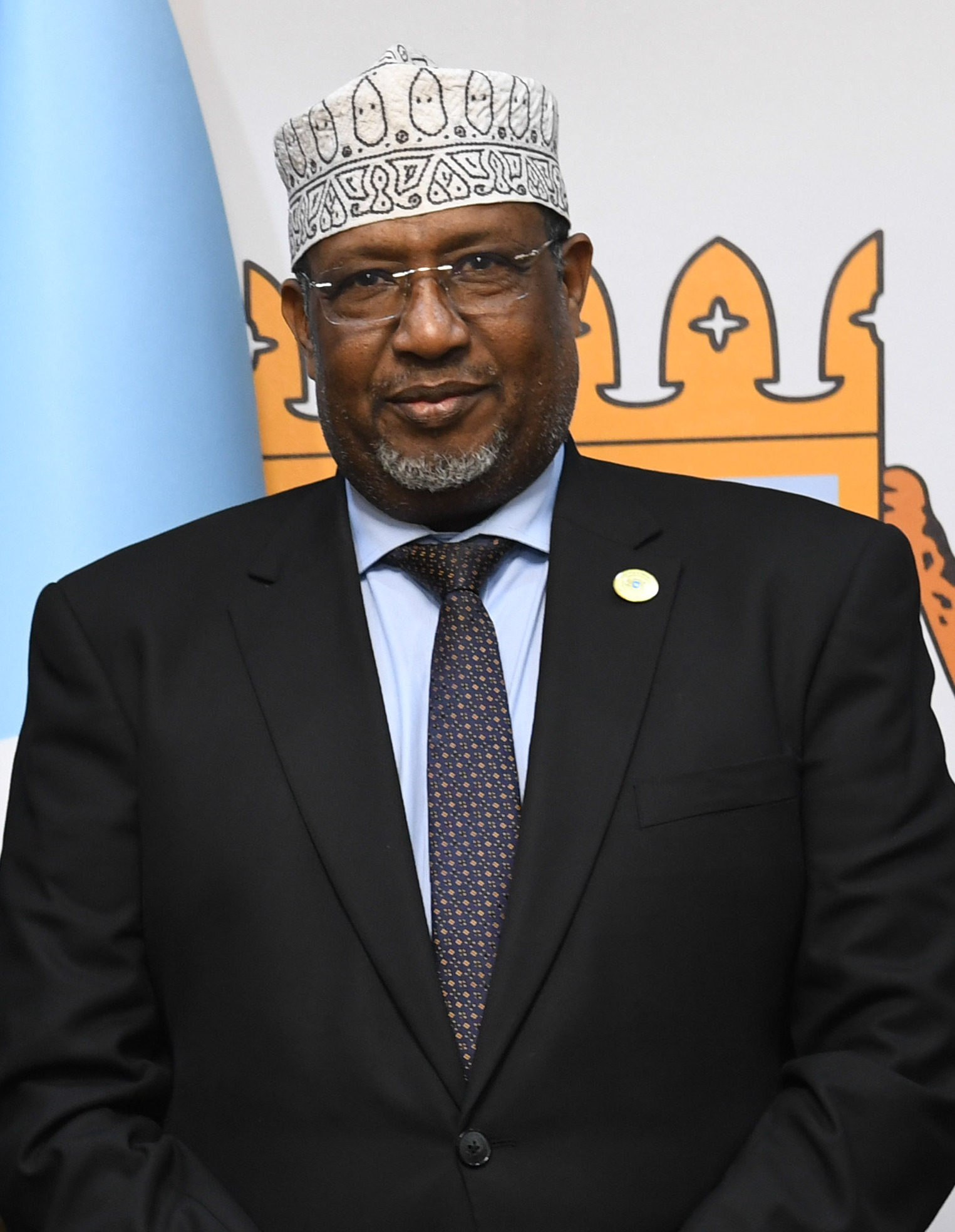
- Incumbent; Aden Madobe since 11 June 2026

This is a list of Leaders of South West State of Somalia, a federated state that is part of the Federal Republic of Somalia.

== List ==
Portrait	Name	Term of Office		Political Party
	Hassan Muhammad Nur	1 April 2002	3 October 2002	Rahanweyn Resistance Army
	Madobe Nunow Mohamed	3 March 2014	3 December 2014	Independent
	Sharif Hassan Sheikh Aden	3 December 2014	7 November 2018	Independent
	Abdulkadir Sharif Shekhuna Maye; Acting	7 November 2018	19 December 2018	Independent
	Abdiaziz Laftagareen	19 December 2018	30 March 2026	Independent
	Ahmed Mohamed Husein; Acting	30 March 2026	1 April 2026	Unknown
	Jibril Abdirashid Haji Abdi; Acting	1 April 2026	11 June 2026	Union for Peace and Development Party
	Aden Madobe	11 June 2026	Incumbent	Union for Peace and Development Party

== See also ==
- List of presidents of Hirshabelle
- List of Presidents of Puntland
- Lists of office-holders
