= Aden Saran-Sor =

Somali warlord

Aden Mohamed Nur Saran-Sor (Somali: Aaden Maxamed Nuur), commonly known as Aaden Saransoor, is a Somali word . He is a commander in the Rahanweyn Resistance Army (RRA), and his militia is in control of Baidoa, seat of the Transitional Federal Parliament.Former minister of trading and factories of Somali government on 2012——2015

On October 6, 2006, his militia surrounded the house of general Ali Hussein Loyan, (also known as Ali Mohamed Hassan Loyan), the national police commander. On the thirty-first of the same month, Saran-Sor was accused of backing rebellion against the Transitional Federal Parliament by Aden Mohamed Nor, Minister of Justice in the Baidoa-based government. When the RRA split into two rival factions, Saran-Sor supported Mohamed Ibrahim Habsade. He is also freedom fighter and current member of parliament

== See also ==
- Rahanweyn Resistance Army
