= Madobe Nunow =

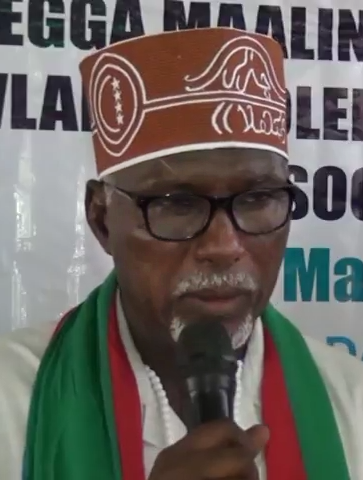

President of South West of Somalia
- In office 3 March 2014 – 3 December 2014
- Preceded by: Hassan Muhammad Nur
- Succeeded by: Sharif Hassan Sheikh Aden

Personal details
- Born: 1949 Dinsoor, Bay, British Somalia
- Died: 29 October 2017 (aged 67–68) Mogadishu, Somalia
- Party: Somali Youth League (1966-1968)

Madobe Nunow Mohamed (Somali: Madoobe Nuunow Maxamed; 1948 — 29 October 2017) is a Somali politician. He was the second president of South West State of Somalia.

He was a prominent leader representing the southern regions and played an influential role in Somali politics, particularly advocating for the South West region's interests within the Somali Parliament before becoming president.

In his role as president from 2014 until his death, Madobe Nunow worked on stabilizing the South West State amidst Somalia's ongoing civil conflict. His leadership was marked by initiatives to enhance development, support reconciliation, and strengthen governance, helping advance the region’s integration into Somalia’s federal system.

== Biography ==
Madobe Nunow Mohamed was born in 1948 in Dinsoor District in the Bay region of Somalia. He was a long time member of the Somali Parliament and worked with Siad Barre's military government, holding positions in organizations at the time.

Nunow completed his primary and secondary education in the 1960s in Dinsor. In the 1970s, he completed his secondary education in the Hawle Wadag District of Mogadishu.

In the late 1970s, Nunow received training at the Halane Training School in Mogadishu, earning a diploma in Political Science from 1979 to 1980 at the Halane Institute of Political Science in Mogadishu. In 1983–1984, Nunow received his SIDAM Diploma in Administration & Management.

On October 29, 2017, he tragically lost his life in a bombing attack at the Nasa-Hablood hotel in Mogadishu, an incident that claimed numerous lives. His death was a significant loss to Somali politics, and he is remembered for his dedication to stability and progress in his region, as well as his contributions to Somalia's federal governance system.

== Political career ==
From 1966 to 1968, he was a member of the Somali Youth League in Bay. From 1974 to 1976, he was a clerk in the Ministry of Interior in Bay. From 1976 to 1978, he was a Head of the Office of the Ministry of Interior in Dinsoor District.

From 1977 to 1978, he was a Head of Social Affairs of SSC in Dinsoor. From 1980 to 1985, he was a First Assistant to the Somali Revolutionary Socialist Party in Sablale District, Lower Shabelle.

From 1981 to 1983, he was a First Assistant to the Somali Revolutionary Socialist Party in Beled Hawo District, Gedo. In 1985, he was the Mayor of Dinsoor. From 1987 to 1990, he was the Secretary of the Somali Revolutionary Socialist Party and the Governor of Adale in the Middle Shabelle. From 1991 to 1992, he was a Chairman of the Dinsor District Rescue Committee in Bay. In 1995, Nunow was one of the founders of the Rahanweyn Resistance Army.

From 2001 to 2012, he was a Member of Parliament of Somalia. Nunow served as Somalia's Deputy Minister of Petroleum from 2004 to 2007, Minister of Information from 2007 to 2008, and Minister of Youth and Sports from 2008 to 2009. From 2009 to 2010, he was the Minister of Constitution & Federal Affairs of Somalia, and one year later, from 2011 to 2012, he was the Chairman of the Parliamentary Committee on Constitution and Federal Affairs. From 2012 to 2014, he was a member of the Technical Committee for the Establishment of the Southwest Administration.
