= Muhammad Ibrahim Habsade =

Somalian politician

Mohamed Ibrahim Habsade (Somali: Maxamed Ibraahim Xaabsade November 10, 1952 – January 24, 2015) was a Somali politician and rebel soldier of the Rahanweyn Resistance Army. He was Minister of Land and Air Transport and Minister of Agriculture in the Somali Transitional Federal Government.

== Life and career ==
Mohamed Ibrahim Habsade was born in Toosweyne village in the Berdale district of Bay region. He served in the military of Siad Barre and was located in the northern part of Somalia, mainly in Hargeisa and Buro. He follows the Sufi sect of Islam, particularly Sheikh Banani Tariqah. He was among the leaders who laid the foundations of Rahanweyn Resistance Army (RRA), established in Jhafay in the outskirts of Berdale district late 1995. He died on January 24, 2015.

=== Background of conflict ===
Prior to Aideed's invasion of Baidoa on 17 September 1995, the Leysan sub-clan of the Rahanweyn clan were almost all the employees of the UNOSOM and the relief Service Organisation. The Al- Ahli Company, run by Sharif Hassan Sheikh Adan whose mother is from Leysan, had monopoly power in signing contract with the Relief Service Organisation whıch were stationed in Baidoa to offer aid to the victims of the famine which hit the area between Juba and Shabelle. This made the other Rahanweyn subclans feel marginalised and prompted frequent clashes between the Leysan and the Harin, the Jiron, and eventually the Elay in September 1995.

The Leysan captured the Eelay inhabited town of Buurhakaba. The Eelay elders resorted to Mohamed Farah Aideed and asked him to attack Baidoa. As a result of this Baidoa fell in the hands of Aideed on a Sunday morning on 17 September 1995. Most of the Rahanwein clans initially welcomed Aideed The Eelay sided with Aideed. The ousted leaders of the Leysan including Habsade resorted to armed resistance to free Baidoa from Aideed, and together with other Rahanweyn politicians founded RRA in Jhafay and appointed by colonel Hassan Mohamed Nor Shaatigaduud.
