= Mohamed Mursal Sheikh Abdurahman =

Somali politician

Mohamed Mursal Sheikh Abdurahman MP
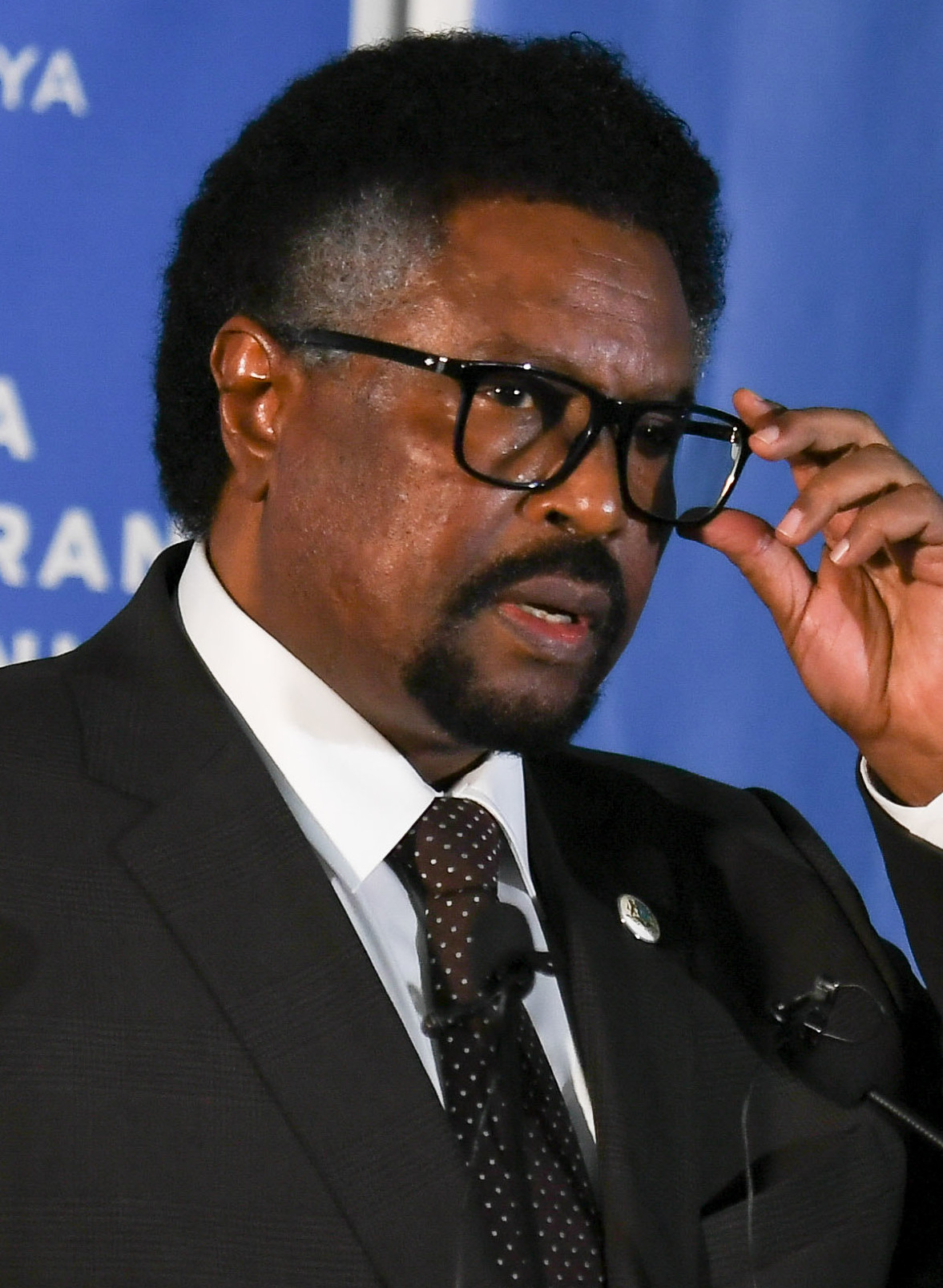
- Mohamed Mursal Sheikh Abdurahman in 2021

13th Speaker of the Somali Parliament
- In office 1 May 2018 – 27 April 2022
- Preceded by: Mohamed Osman Jawari
- Succeeded by: Aden Madobe

Dr. Mohamed Mursal Sheikh Abdurahman (Somali: Maxamed Mursal Sheikh Cabduraxman) is the former speaker of the Somali parliament, who was elected on 30 April 2018. Born in Baidoa, Somalia, he previously served as Minister of Defence as well as Minister of Energy and Water Resources, Minister of National Assets and Public Procurement deputy district commissioner of Baidoa District of Somalia, and member of the Transitional Federal Parliament. He was also the Ambassador of the Somali Federal Republic to the Republic of Turkey.

On December 12, 2018, it was reported that Mursal had relocated from his residence inside Villa Somalia, to a house near the airport as disputes with his deputies over impeachment of President Mohamed Farmaajo and the fate of the House Budget Committee continued.

He was replaced as speaker by Aden Madobe who took over as the next Speaker of Parliament.
