= Buur Heybe =

- Village
- Location in Somalia.
- Coordinates: 3°00′00″N 44°19′00″E
- Country: Somalia
- State: South West
- Region: Bay
- Time zone: UTC+3 (EAT)

Buur Heybe, which translates to "The Hill of the Potter's Sand", is a late Pleistocene and Holocene archaeological complex located in the largest granite inselberg in the inter-riverine region of the southern Bay province of Somalia approximately 180 km northwest of the capital Mogadishu. Buur Heybe has a longstanding history of archaeological research dating back to the 1930s when Paolo Graziosi carried out the first professional archaeological excavation in Somalia in the rockshelter site of Gogoshiis Qabe in Buur Heybe. Further excavations by J. Desmond Clark in the 1950s and later by the Buur Ecological and Archaeological Project (BEAP) led by Steven Brandt in the 1980s have made Buur Heybe one of the best dated and closely studied archaeological sites in Somalia.

Excavations in the Buur Region ended abruptly in 1989 as the encroaching Somali Civil War threatened to engulf southern Somalia, although plans were made by BEAP to return to the Buur Region in 1990, the collapse of the Somali government effectively ended all archaeological research in Southern and Central Somalia to this day. Furthermore, as war consumed Mogadishu the Somali National Museum was looted resulting in the destruction of all BEAP archaeological collections which included soil samples, lithics, and human skeletons from Buur Heybe and Guli Waabayo. Fortunately for archaeologists, the Somali Academy of Science granted BEAP approval to export much of the faunal, shell, lithic, and pottery collections from Gogoshiis Qabe, Guli Waabayo and Rifle Range Site to three United States universities prior to the collapse of the Somali government. These collections were originally curated at the University of Florida, Washington University in St. Louis, and the University of Wisconsin-Madison. However, currently the majority of archaeological collections that were originally exported during the Somali Civil War are being curated at the University of Florida.

== Environment ==
Buur Heybe is situated in the inter-riverine region of southern Somalia. Located between the Shebele and Jubba rivers, this region is characterized by flat bushland and thicket environment with Precambrian granitic inselbergs known as "buur" in Somali, which provide topographic and ecological diversity. These inselbergs are scattered across the landscape forming distinctive landmarks in this otherwise flat and semi arid ecosystem. At ~4.7 km$^2$ in dimension and rising 610m above sea level (a.s.l) Buur Heybe stands out as the largest inselberg in the Buur Region creating a unique ecological environment that supports diverse ecosystems of different species of plants and animals, creating an ecologically-productive environment for small animals such as dik-dik and hyrax. In the semi-arid climate of southern Somalia the mean annual rainfall is ~560mm with two rainy seasons from March to May and from October to November. Due to the unique ecological features of the inselberg rainfall collects in artificial and natural pools below, and natural springs which work in tangent to create one of the few consistent water sources in the region.

Similar to modern day climate, the paleoclimate of late Pleistocene and Holocene southern Somalia was characterized by regular fluctuations in temperature and rainfall as a result of variable season shifts in the position of the Intertropical Convergence Zone. Recent publications focused on the analysis of terrestrial leaf waxes found in a marine core from the Gulf of Eden off the coast of Djibouti indicates that the transition between humid and arid periods (~15,000-5,000) were more abrupt than previously thought posing unique challenges for hunter-gatherer populations.

== Archaeological overview ==
The Buur Heybe inselberg is made up of two rock shelter archaeological sites: the aforementioned Gogoshiis Qabe and Guli Waabayo which have been excavated by several archeological teams between the 1930s to the late 1980s, and represent two of the best chronometrically dated archaeological sites in Somalia. According to Brandt, Gogoshiis Qabe and Guli Waabayo are two of ~100 rockshelter sites found in Buur Heybe, most of which are believed to date back to the early/mid Holocene based on pottery and stone tools artifacts. Additionally, it's worth mentioning the Buur Hakaba inselberg, ~25 km from Buur Heybe, as another important archaeological site in the Buur Region. Excavated by J. Desmond Clark and Steven Brandt, the Rifle Range Site contributes to our limited, but important understanding of Somali archaeology. Somalia's first archaeological excavation was carried out by Italian archaeologist Paolo Graziosi when he excavated the rockshelter site of Gogishiis Qabe at Buur Heybe in 1935. Graziosi excavated two contiguous trenches that revealed a continuous Middle Stone Age (MSA) to Later Stone Age (LSA) sequence yielding artifacts and faunal remains. During his 1935 excavation at Gogoshiis Qabe, Graziosi identified three major lithic industries: the lower MSA 'Stillbay' followed by the transitional 'Magosian' industry, and lastly followed by the upper LSA 'Eibian' industry. Following Graziosi's excavations, British military personnel/archaeologist J. Desmond Clark continued archaeological fieldwork in the Buur Region, and was the first to excavate the open air Rifle Range Site in Buur Hakaba, as he conducted archaeological work throughout the 1940s. In 1944 Clark excavated the rockshelter site of Guli Waabayo revealing a ~3m deep culture-stratigraphic sequence in which he identified a late MSA/early LSA lithic industry at the base of the sequence which he identified as the 'Magosian', and a transitional late MSA/early LSA industry which Clark coined as the 'Mogosian/Doian' or 'Lower 'Doian'. In an attempt to develop the first broad culture-historical and climatological sequence for the Horn of Africa, Clark published The Prehistoric Cultures of the Horn of Africa in 1954 by combining his data with that of previous researchers at the time. Overall, Clark recognized three major MSA culture industries and four LSA industries, but these have been scrutinized and largely abandoned over time by archaeologists as they were predicated on the analyses of small, and often selected samples that were collected from the surface or from secondary stratified contexts like eroding sites, pans and banks of rivers. Further excavations and analysis carried out by Brandt as a part of the Buur Ecological and Archaeological Project (BEAP) in the 1980s revealed that Clark's 'Doian' industry was identical to Graziosi's Eibian industry and argued that, "most of the culture-histories units formulated by Clark (1954) more than 30 years ago are in need of revision." Brandt opted to prioritize the original framework of Graziosi's Eibian industry to describe the LSA/terminal Pleistocene industry of Buur Heybe and identified a new early/mid Holocene industry that lacked distinctive Eibian features which he named the Bardaale industry after the local village surrounding Buur Heybe. According to Brandt, BEAP's objective was to establish, "a long-term interdisciplinary study of late Pleistocene/Holocene human subsistence and settlement patterns in the inter-riverine region of southern Somalia." Excavations by BEAP at Gogoshiis Qabe in 1983 and 1985 revealed the skeletal remains of fourteen human individuals that date back to the early Holocene, and represent the earliest indisputable evidence of mortuary practices from the Horn of Africa. The excavations carried out by BEAP throughout the 1980s represent the last major archaeological project in Somalia to this day as the Somali Civil War engulfed the country in 1991 and effectively put an end to all archaeological research in Somalia. Prior to the collapse of Somalia's government, BEAP was granted permission by the Somali Academy of Sciences to ship out most of the archaeological collections from the Somali National Museum to the three United States universities for curating and future archaeological research. The majority of recent analyses and publications in Somali archaeology have been directly linked to the BEAP's collection that were exported out of Somalia prior to the Somali Civil War.

Several important analyses and publications have been carried out using these expatriated collections through the years, most recently Mica Jones' publication of sixteen newly obtained radiocarbon dates from ostrich eggshell provided the earliest radiometric evidence of LSA occupation in the southeastern Horn of Africa going back ~30,000 years.

=== Human burials ===
BEAP's 1983 and 1985 field season uncovered the skeletal remains of fourteen human individuals. Eleven virtually complete and articulated primary burials, one secondary burials, and two individuals represented solely by partial dentitions. These human remains represent the first Stone Age human remains from Somalia found in primary context, and the earliest evidence of mortuary practices in the Horn of Africa.

Within the human burials BEAP found grave goods in the form of thirteen complete pairs of lesser kudu horn cores, and six complete single lesser kudu horn cores were also present. These grave goods represent the earliest chronometrically dated evidence from eastern Africa (and one of the earliest in Africa overall) for the intentional positioning of grave goods within a burial.

=== Radiocarbon analyses ===
A recent study of sixteen new and seven recently published radiocarbon dates of faunal remains (ostrich eggshell) from the Guli Waabayo rockshelter in Buur Heybe have provided evidence of the continuous use of the site for over a ~30,000 year period that covers most of the Marine Isotope Stage (MIS) 2 (~29-14.5ka) and the MIS 1 African Humid Period ~14.5-6 ka.) Using Bayesian analysis to determine the separate phases of occupation at the rockshelter site, researchers were able to discover two major periods of site occupation that align with the lithic evidence and human remains.

These results are important because they provide a new chronological model for Guli Waabayo regarding continuous occupation of the site. This evidence challenges previously help assumptions about the responses of hunter-gatherer groups to decreased rainfall and semi-arid climates during periods of major environmental changes.

== Lithic (stone tool) industries ==
The early archaeological research at Buur Heybe suggested the existence of several MSA and LSA lithic industries. Archaeologists like Paolo Graziosi and J. Desmond Clark argued for the existence of stone tool industries like the 'Stillbay', 'Wilton', and 'Hargesian'. However, these technological industries have largely been abandoned or revised by modern archaeologists due to the insufficient amount of data to justify their existence.

Lithic analyses conducted by BEAP, however, highlights two major lithic industries in the distinctly late Pleistocene Eibian industry, and early/mid Holocene Bardaale industry.

=== Eibian ===
The Eibian lithic industry, previously known as the 'Doian' by Clark, is characterized by distinctive pressure-flaked tools like prismatic and single to multiple platform flake/blade cores, occasional Levallois and disc cores, small points, trihedral rods, microliths (backed pieces), scrapers and other retouched tools made on exotic cherts and local quartz, furthermore, BEAP excavations revealed that the Eibian industry is a pre-ceramic industry as it was associated exclusively with wild fauna.

The Eibian lithic industry is of particular interest due to presence of pressure-flaked tools made on exotic raw material like chert that are unique to the LSA of eastern Africa.

=== Bardaale ===
The Bardaale industry divided into two phases: Phase 1 (pre-pottery), and Phase 2 (pottery). Phase 1 of the Badaale industry was unearthed from the early Holocene sands of Gogoshiis Qabe made up of various stone tools that include "expedient" quartz bipolar cores, backed pieces (microliths), small scrapers, and rare grindstones that lacked the distinctive pressure-flaked tools that characterized the Eibian lithic assemblages.

The Bardaale industry differs from the Eibian industry by the lack of the distinctive pressure-flaked tools and the type of raw materials used. Unlike the 'Eibian' industry which was made up of almost 30% exotic cherts, the Bardaale stone tools are almost exclusively manufactured on locally available quartz and limestone signaling a change in the sourcing of raw materials.

Recently obtained AMS radiocarbon dates by archaeologist Mica Jones suggests that the transition from the Eibian stone tool industry to a more "expedient" and locally sourced Bardaale tradition happened during a period of major environmental change near the end of MIS 2.

== Buur Ecological and Archaeological Project (BEAP) ==
The Buur Ecological and Archaeological Project (BEAP) is a long-term multidisciplinary study of Late Pleistocene and Holocene subsistence and settlement patterns in the inter-riverine region of southern Somalia, focusing primarily on the Jubba and Shebelle river valleys. In 1983, Steven Brandt formed the (BEAP) to test an ecological model of human mobility strategies through excavations at new and previously known sites in inter-riverine southern Somalia.

== History ==
Buur Heybe historically served as a key religious and political hub. According to oral tradition in the Doi ("red soil") belt, several dynasties were based in the town. The Eyle tradition indicates that the area was at various times invaded and occupied by a succession of early Cushitic settlers, the Jidle, Maadanle and Ajuran, whom they each managed to defeat. A number of ancient burial sites dated from this pre-Islamic period sit atop the mountain's peak, and are a center of annual pilgrimage (siyaro). A trench near the holy places is said to serve as a passage toward heaven (siraad), and as such is off-limits to individuals possessing a nefarious past. These burial sites on the mountain's summit were later made into Muslim holy sites in the ensuing Islamic period, including the Owol Qaasing (derived from the Arabic "Abdul Qaasim", one of the names of Muhammad) and Sheikh Abdulqadir al-Jilaani (named for the founder of the Qadiriyya order).

Additionally, the area is a center of pottery production. The Bur Ecological and Archaeological Project established in 1983 uncovered hundreds of sherds from the site and other rock shelters. Oral tradition suggests that the Eyle were the first people to make pottery in Buur Heybe.

== Demographics ==
Buur Heybe is today primarily inhabited by the Eyle, a sub-clan of the Rahanwayne of agropastoralists, potters and part-time hunters. Their ethnonym translates as the "hunters with dogs". The Eyle are believed to be remnants of the aboriginal San hunter-gatherers who inhabited southern Somalia prior to the arrival from the north of Afro-Asiatic populations of the Cushitic branch. Buur Heybe is consequently also known as Buur Eyle ("Eyle mountain"), in recognition of the first inhabitants in the surrounding villages of Howaal Dheri, Berdaale and Muuney.
