= Abdikarim Egeh Gulaid =

Somalian politician

Abdikarim Egeh Gulaid is Minister for Finance in the Transitional Federal Government of Somalia, and former Minister of State for Public Works & Housing.

== See also ==
- List of members of the Somali Transitional Federal Parliament
