= Jibril Abdirashid Haji Abdi =

Somalia's second deputy prime minister

- Jibril Cabdirashiid Xaaji Cabdi جبريل عبد الرشيد حاجي عبدي
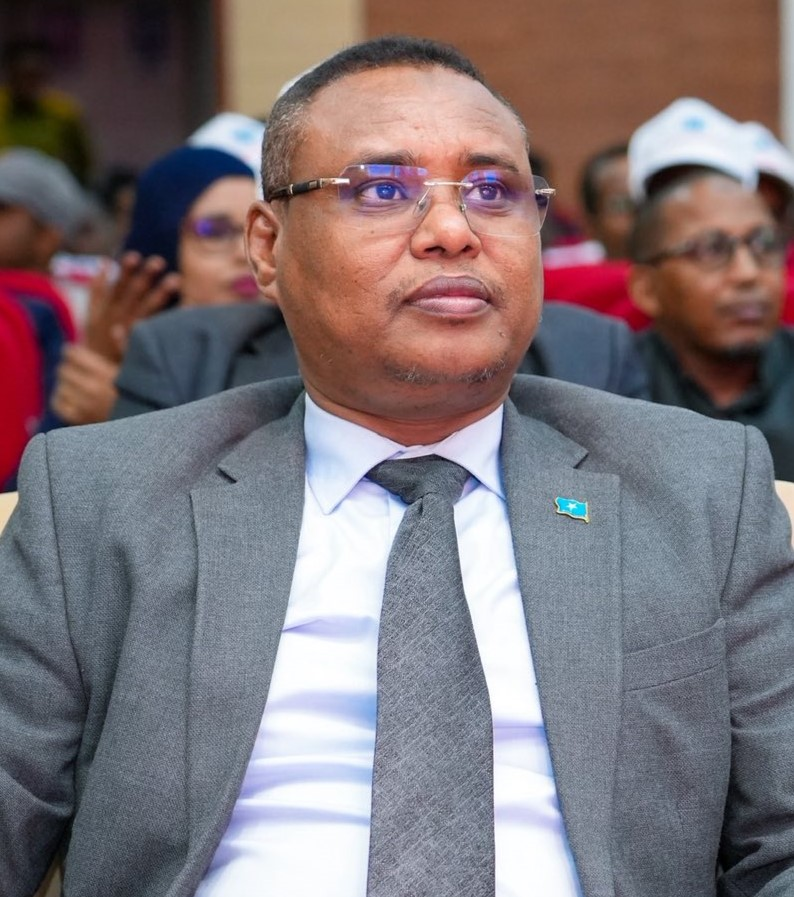
- Abdi in 2025

Second Deputy Prime Minister of Somalia
- Incumbent
- Assumed office June 2025
- President: Hassan Sheikh Mohamud
- Prime Minister: Hamza Abdi Barre
- Preceded by: Position established

Interim Leader of South West State of Somalia
- In office 1 April 2026 – 11 June 2026
- Preceded by: Abdiaziz Laftagareen
- Succeeded by: Aden Madobe

Minister of Defence of Somalia
- In office 17 March 2025 – 27 April 2025
- President: Hassan Sheikh Mohamud
- Prime Minister: Hamza Abdi Barre
- Preceded by: Abdulkadir Mohamed Nur
- Succeeded by: Ahmed Moallim Fiqi

Minister of Commerce and Industry of Somalia
- In office 2022 – 17 March 2025
- President: Hassan Sheikh Mohamud
- Prime Minister: Hamza Abdi Barre

Member of the Federal Parliament of Somalia
- In office 2016–2022
- Constituency: Jubaland

Member of the Federal Parliament of Somalia
- Incumbent
- Assumed office 2022
- Constituency: Jubaland

Personal details
- Party: Union for Peace and Development Party
- Occupation: Politician
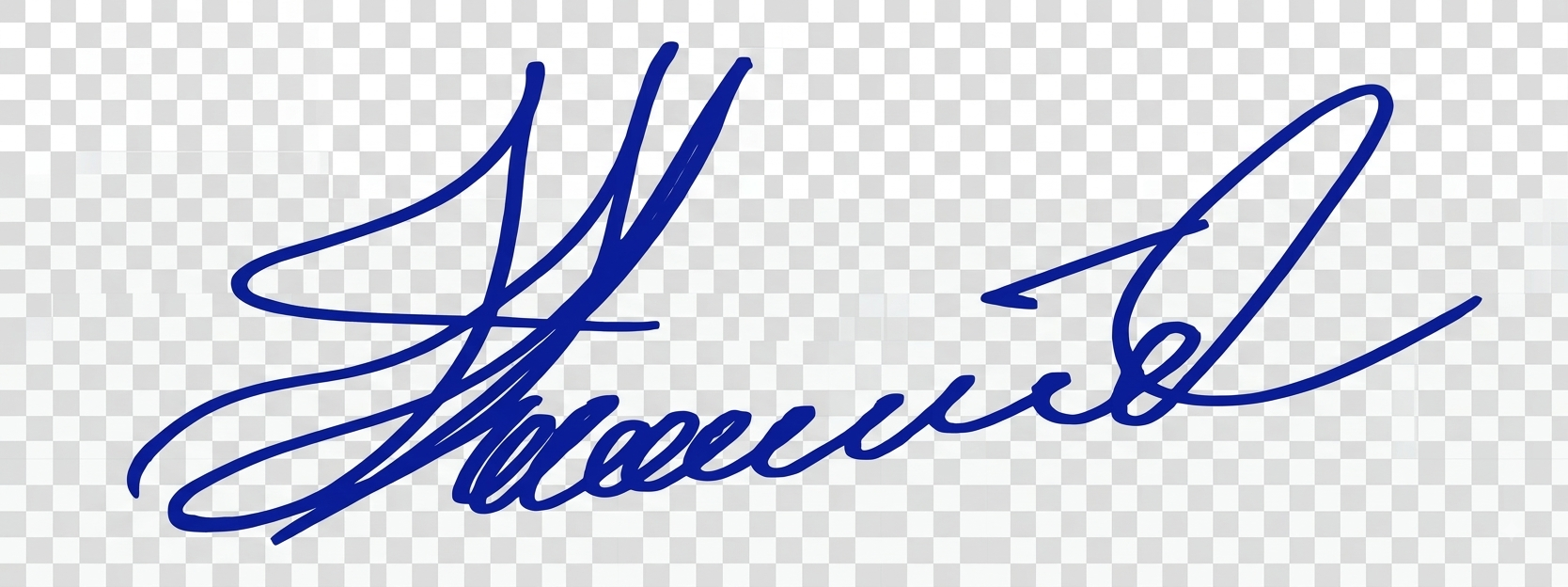
- Signature
- Jibril speaking

Jibril Abdirashid Haji Abdi is a Somali politician currently serving as the Second Deputy Prime Minister since 2025. He is also member of the Federal Parliament, representing Jubaland. Before becoming deputy prime minister, he served as Minister of Commerce and Industry and later as Minister of Defence. Abdirashid previously served as a Member of Parliament representing Jubaland in the Federal Parliament of Somalia. He has also worked at the Federal Ministry of Justice and as a lecturer at the University of Somalia.
