= Mire Hagi Farah Mohamed =

Somali politician (1962–2006)

Deputy Minister of Foreign Affairs of Somalia
- Incumbent
- Assumed office 27 January 2015

Dr. Mire Hagi Farah Yusuf (Somali: Mire Xaaji Faarax Yuusuf) also known as Mire Hagi Farah Mohamed (1962 – 12 October 2006) was a Somali politician. In 2004, he was elected to the Transitional Federal Parliament of Somalia. During his tenure, he served as the Minister of Finance.

In 1997, he served as the district commissioner for the port city of Kismayo. During his tenure, floods along the Jubba River led to food shortages and the potential for "serious outbreaks of typhoid fever and cholera"; Mohamed promised "a secure environment for humanitarian operations" if international aid groups provided assistance.
