= Qansahdhere =

Qansaxdheere Qansaxdheere قنسحطيري
- Town
- Qansahdhere
- Nickname: Banban
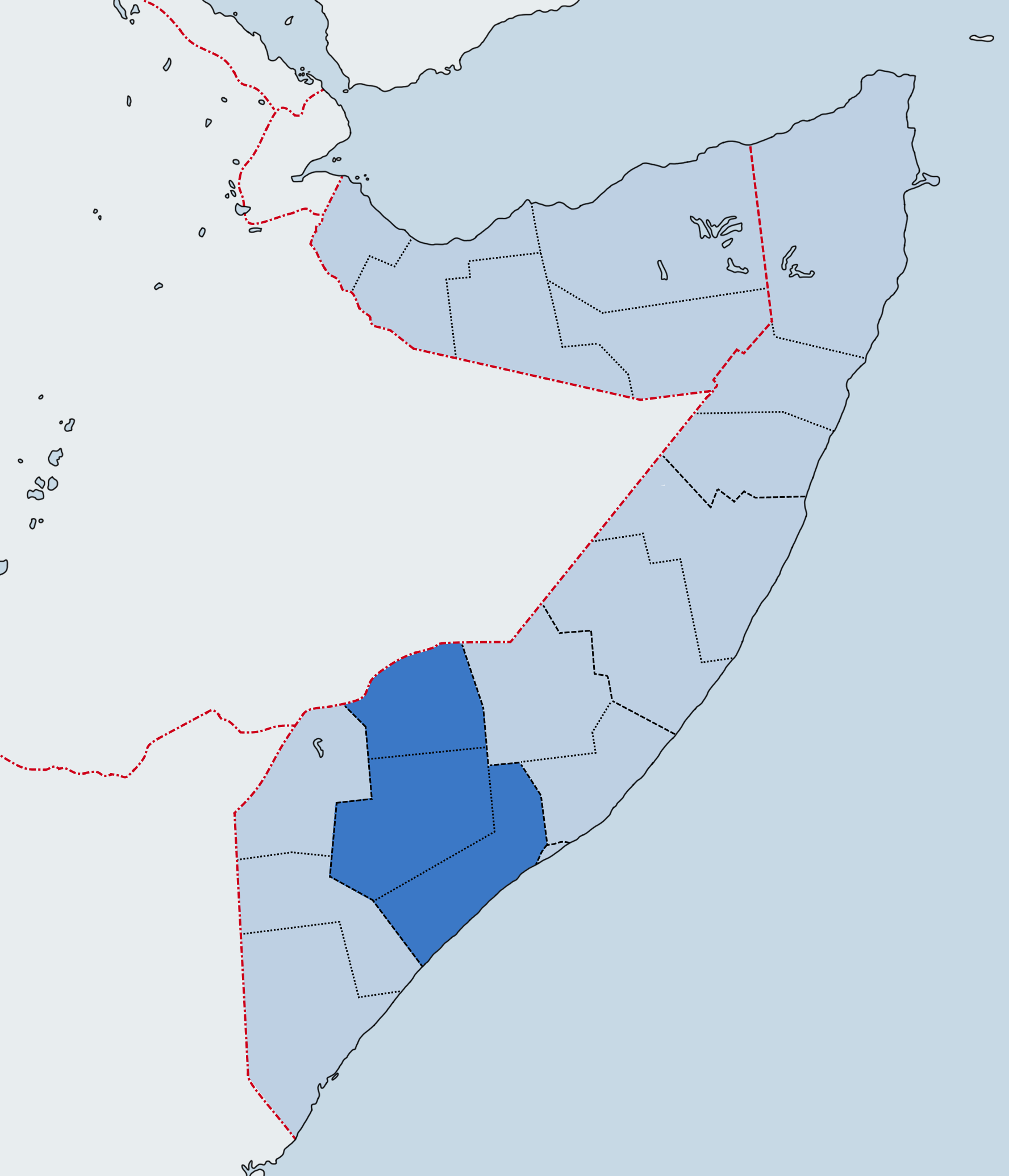

- Location within Somalia
- Coordinates: 2.87°N 43°E
- Country: Somalia
- State: South West
- Region: Baay

Government
  - Mayor: Abdi Ibrahim Dhayib

Population
  - Total: 76,714
- Time zone: UTC+3 (EAT)

Qansahdhere (Maay: Qasidheeri, Somali: Qansaxdheere), also known as Qansax Dheere, is a town in the southern Bay region of Somalia. The broader Qansahdhere District has a total population of 76,714 residents.

Most local residents of the district are from Gelidle, Yantar, Hubeer, Luway and Emid clans. The main language spoken in the district is Maay language.

== Economy ==
Qansaxdheere is a livestock trading hub due to its location. On Mondays and Fridays, business people from the surrounding areas come to this town to trade livestock. Agricultural products also contribute significantly to the town's GDP. Over the last ten years, cultivating has shifted from primarily crops to crops, vegetables, and fruits. Mondays and Fridays have the highest level of economic activity compared to the other days of the week. There are also modern services such as telecommunications, internet access, and shopping malls.

== Health ==
Qansahdhere has two hospitals (SOS CHILDREN’S VILLAGE [Qansahdhere Hospital] ) and two MCHs (MARDO and URRO) which mainly carry nutrition support in a mandated form.
