= Aden Madobe =

Somali politician (born 1956)

- ادم مادوبي; Aaden Madoobe
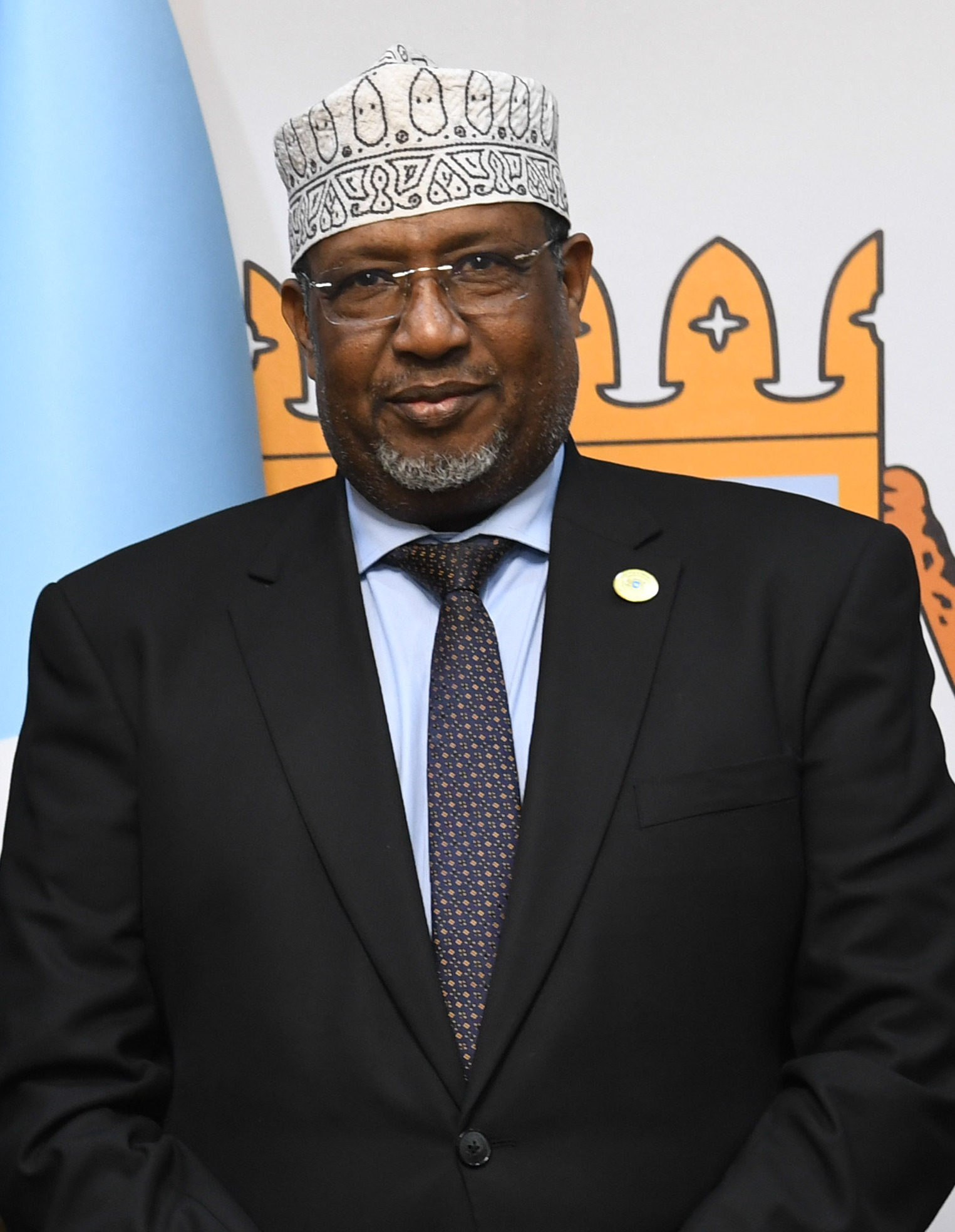
- Madobe in 2023

Leader of the South West State
- Incumbent
- Assumed office 11 June 2026
- Preceded by: Abdiaziz Laftagareen; Jibril Abdirashid Haji Abdi (acting)

Acting President of Somalia
- In office 29 December 2008 – 31 January 2009
- Prime Minister: Nur Hassan Hussein
- Preceded by: Abdullahi Yusuf Ahmed
- Succeeded by: Sharif Sheikh Ahmed

Speaker of the House of the People of Somalia
- In office 30 April 2022 – 11 June 2026
- President: Hassan Sheikh Mohamud
- Prime Minister: Hamza Abdi Barre
- Preceded by: Mohamed Mursal Sheikh Abdurahman
- Succeeded by: Abdulkadir Mohamed Nur

Speaker of the Transitional Federal Parliament of Somalia
- In office 31 January 2007 – 25 May 2010
- President: Abdullahi Yusuf Ahmed; Himself (acting); Sharif Sheikh Ahmed
- Prime Minister: Ali Mohammed Ghedi; Salim Aliyow Ibrow; Nur Hassan Hussein; Omar Sharmarke
- Preceded by: Sharif Hassan Sheikh Aden
- Succeeded by: Sharif Hassan Sheikh Aden

Personal details
- Born: 15 April 1956 (age 70) Hudur, Trust Territory of Somaliland
- Occupation: Politician
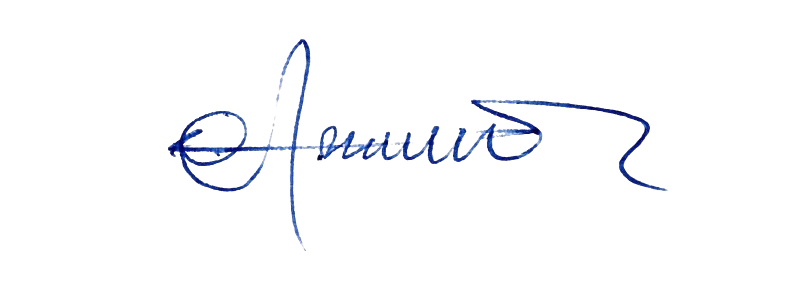
- Signature

Aden Mohamed Nuur Madobe (Afmaxaa: Sheekh Aaden Maxamed Nuur Madoobe , Arabic: آدم محمد نور مادوبي, Afmaay: Sheeg Ethyng Mothoowy, born 15 April 1956), popularly known as Aden Madobe, is a Somali politician who has served as the leader of the South West State of Somalia

He previously served as the Speaker of the Lower House of the Federal Parliament of Somalia from 2022 to 2026. Earlier, he served as the First Deputy Chairman of the Rahanweyn Resistance Army, before later joining the newly formed Transitional Federal Government (TFG) of Somalia as Minister of Justice and Speaker of the Transitional Federal Parliament.

From 29 December 2008 to 31 January 2009, Madobe briefly served as acting president of Somalia. In January 2014, he was appointed Minister of Industry and Commerce.

== Personal life ==
Madobe was born in Hudur, the capital of Bakool region of Somalia. He belongs to the Hadame subclan of the Rahanweyn (Digil and Mirifle).

== Career ==
=== Rahanweyn Resistance Army (RRA) ===
Madobe served as the First Deputy Chairman of the Rahanweyn Resistance Army (RRA), one of the factions of the Somali Civil War. According to Adan Madobe, beginning in 1996, the RRA accepted the assistance of Ethiopia in the training of its troops. In 2003, he temporarily split with his fellow RRA leader Hassan Mohamed Nur "Shatigadud", though they later reconciled and both served as ministers in the Transitional Federal Government (TFG).

=== Transitional Federal Government ===
In January 2005, Madobe was appointed Minister of Justice of the nascent Transitional Federal Government, part of Prime Minister Ali Mohamed Ghedi's second cabinet lineup.

In May 2005, rival parliamentarian and faction leader Muhammad Ibrahim Habsade accused Madobe and Agriculture Minister Hassan Mohamed Nuur "Shatigudud" of attacking Baidoa to take the city on behalf of President Abdullahi Yusuf Ahmed's TFG. The TFG later used the town as a temporary capital. Nineteen were killed in the ensuing fight for control over the city.

=== Speaker of the Transitional Federal Parliament ===
On 31 January 2007, Madobe was elected Speaker by the Transitional Federal Parliament (TFP). His predecessor at the position Sharif Hassan Sheikh Adan was voted out by the legislature on January 17, 2007 due to his alleged support for the Islamic Courts Union (ICU). Madobe was later sworn into office on February 3.

Madobe later briefly served as acting TFG president, after the incumbent President of Somalia Yusuf resigned from office on 29 December 2008. On 31 January 2009, Sharif Sheikh Ahmed was voted in as the new president.

In April and May 2010, a rift developed between Madobe and Prime Minister of Somalia, Omar Abdirashid Ali Sharmarke. The row culminated in Madobe's resignation after parliament later voted to remove him from office.

On May 25, 2010, Sharif Hassan was re-elected Speaker of the Transitional Federal Parliament in place of Madobe.

=== Minister of Industry and Commerce ===
On 17 January 2014, Madobe was appointed Minister of Industry and Commerce by Prime Minister Abdiweli Sheikh Ahmed.

=== Speaker of the Federal Parliament ===
Madobe again became Speaker of House of the People (Lower House of the Parliament of Somalia) on 27 April 2022.

=== leader of the South West State ===
In 2026, Madobe was elected the leader of the South West State, taking office on 11 June and vacating his Speakership position.

Political offices
| Preceded by Sharif Hassan Sheikh Aden | Speaker of the Transitional Federal Parliament of Somalia; 2007–2010 | Succeeded by Sharif Hassan Sheikh Aden |
| Preceded by Abdullahi Yusuf Ahmed | President of Somalia; Acting; 2008–2009 | Succeeded by Sharif Ahmed |
| Preceded by Mohamed Mursal Sheikh Abdurahman | Speaker of the House of the People of Somalia; 2022–2026 | Succeeded by TBD |
| Preceded by Abdiaziz Laftagareen; Jibril Abdirashid Haji Abdi (acting) | leader of the South West State; 2026–present | Succeeded by Incumbent |
