= Said Ali Hussein =

Somali-Dutch footballer (born 2000)

Personal information
- Full name: Said Ali Hussein
- Date of birth: 7 July 2000 (age 26)
- Place of birth: Baidoa, Somalia
- Height: 1.73 m (5 ft 8 in)
- Position: Winger

Team information
- Current team: Emplina
- Number: 7

Youth career
- Avanti '31

Senior career*
Years	Team	Apps	(Gls)
2017–2021	Avanti '31		
2021–	Emplina		

International career^{‡}
2019–	Somalia	1	(0)
- * Club domestic league appearances and goals as of 00:00, 13 January 2020 (UTC) ‡ National team caps and goals as of 00:00, 13 January 2020 (UTC)

Said Ali Hussein (born 7 July 2000) is a Somali-Dutch footballer who plays as attacker (association football) left winger for Dutch club Emplina and the Somalia national team.

== Club career ==
Ali Hussein was born in Baidoa, Somalia. At the age of ten, Hussein moved to Schijndel, the Netherlands as a result of the Somali Civil War. After emigrating to the Netherlands, Saïd joined Avanti '31, making his debut for the first team at the age of 16. In the summer of 2018, Ali Hussein joined Den Bosch on trial, however ultimately stayed at Avanti '31. in 2021 he exchanged avanti for Emplina.

== International career ==
On 9 December 2019, Ali Hussein made his debut for Somalia in a 2–0 loss against Uganda in the 2019 CECAFA Cup.
