= Qasahdhere District =

Qasahdhere
- District
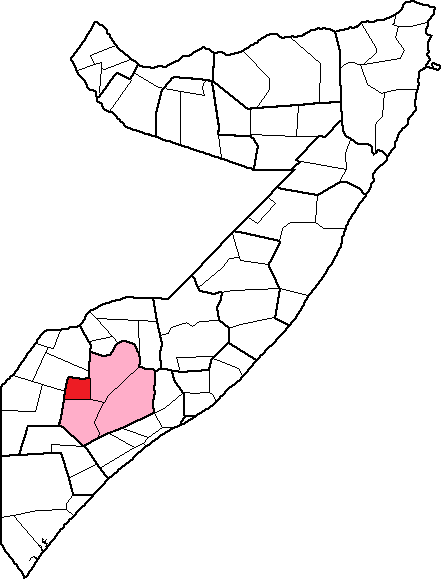
- Country: Somalia
- Region: Bay
- Capital: Qansahdhere
- Time zone: UTC+3 (EAT)

Qasahdhere District (Qansahdhere District) is a district in the southern Bay region of Somalia. Its capital is Qansahdhere.

In January 2008, during the Ethiopian occupation of Somalia, insurgents from the Islamic Courts Union established a base and nearly took over the entire district.
