= Jama Gure Qobey =

Somali politician

Jama Gure Qobey is a Somali politician who served in the Transitional Federal Parliament of Somalia during the 2000s. Qobey was an opponent of Ethiopian and American intervention in Somalia.
