= Abdiaziz Laftagareen =

President of South West of Somalia

Abdiaziz Hassan Mohamed
- Cabdicasiis Xasan Maxamed عبدالعزيز حسن محمد
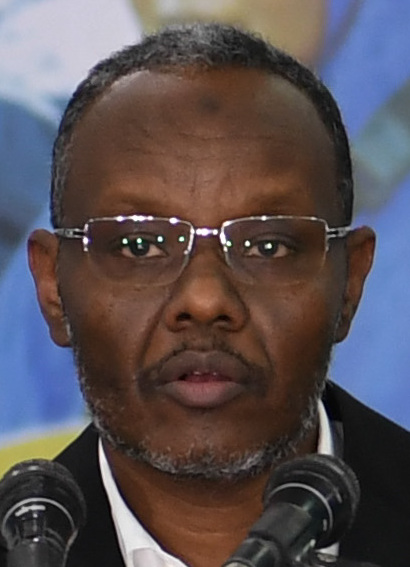
- Laftagareen in 2019

President of South West of Somalia
- In office 19 December 2018 – 30 March 2026
- Preceded by: Sharif Hassan Sheikh Aden; Abdulkadir Sharif Shekhuna Maye (acting)
- Succeeded by: Aden Madobe; Ahmed Mohamed Husein (Acting)

Personal details
- Born: 1965 (age 60–61) Beledhawo, Somalia
- Spouse: Zamzam Mahad Abdulrahman
- Children: 4

Abdiaziz Hassan Mohamed Laftagareen (Somali: Cabdicasiis Xasan Maxamed Laftagareen; عبد العزيز حسن محمد لفتاغرين) is a Somali politician who served as the fourth president of the South West State of Somalia, elected by representatives of South West regional state assembly on 19 December 2018. In 2019, Laftagareen had a committee appointed to deal with security issues. Laftagareen had close ties with former president Mohamed Abdullahi Farmaajo, in which he served as a minister before becoming the president of the regional state.

He completed his primary, middle and high school education in Luuq district, Gedo region in the southwest of the country. He was a school teacher in Luuq. He studied at a university in Mogadishu. Abdiaziz Laftagareen has held many positions in previous governments.

Laftagareen is married and has four children, living in Turkey.

== Early life and education ==
He completed his primary, middle and high school education in luau ganaane. He was a school teacher in Luuq. He studied at a university in Mogadishu.

== Career ==
In 2007, he was the Deputy General Manager of Mogadishu Port. In 2008, he was Minister of Labor and Social Affairs in the government of Prime Minister Nur Adde. In 2009, he was the Minister of Transport and Maritime Affairs in the government of Omar Abdirashid Ali Sharmarke. In 2010, he was Minister of Livestock in the government of Prime Minister Omar Abdirashid Ali Sharmarke.

He was the Minister of State for Posts in the government of Prime Minister Mohamed Abdullahi Farmajo. He was the Minister of Information and Telecommunications in the government of Prime Minister Abdiweli Sheikh Ahmed. Laftagareen was the deputy minister of fisheries, in the government of Prime Minister Hassan Ali Khaire, He was the state minister for trade. Abdiaziz Hassan Mohamed Laftagareen ran for speaker of parliament. He was the Minister of Energy and Water Resources.

Abdiaziz Hassan Mohamed (Laftagareen) won the 2018 presidential election in the South West state, receiving 101 votes while the next candidate Aden Mohamed Nur Saransor received 22 votes.

As the president of South West State, he has signed the South West State of Somalia Development Plan 2021-2025 prepared by the Ministry of Investment Planning and Economic Development of South West State.

In March 2026, as part of the constitutional crisis in Somalia, Laftagareen severed ties with the central government. After the Federal army took military occupation of Baidoba on 30 March, Laftagareen resigned and fled to Nairobi. He was succeeded by an interim government appointed by the national government.

From May until at least September 2026, as the constitutional crisis continued, militias loyal to Laftagareen clashed with the central government, including armed fighting in Baidoba.
