= Baidoa =

City in the South West State of Somalia

Baidoa بيدوا Baydhabo Baydhowy
- City
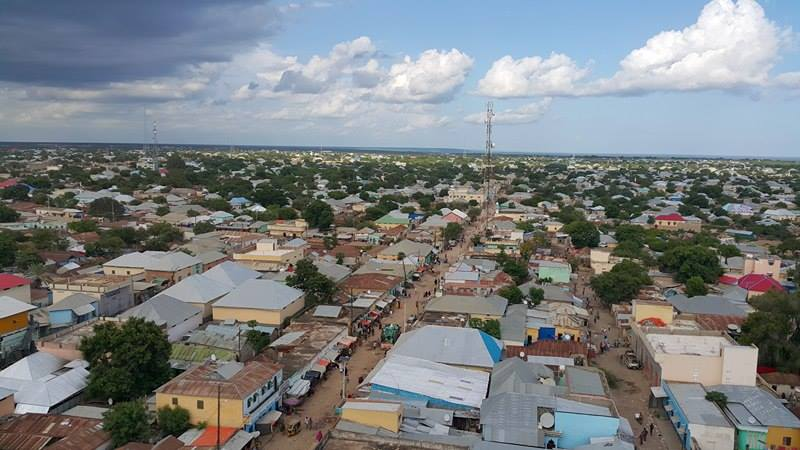
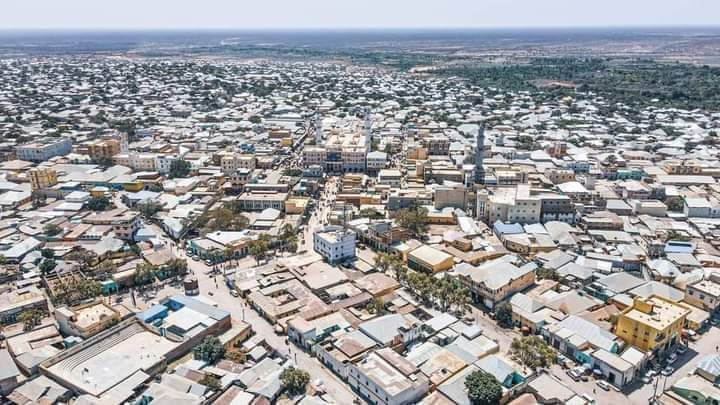
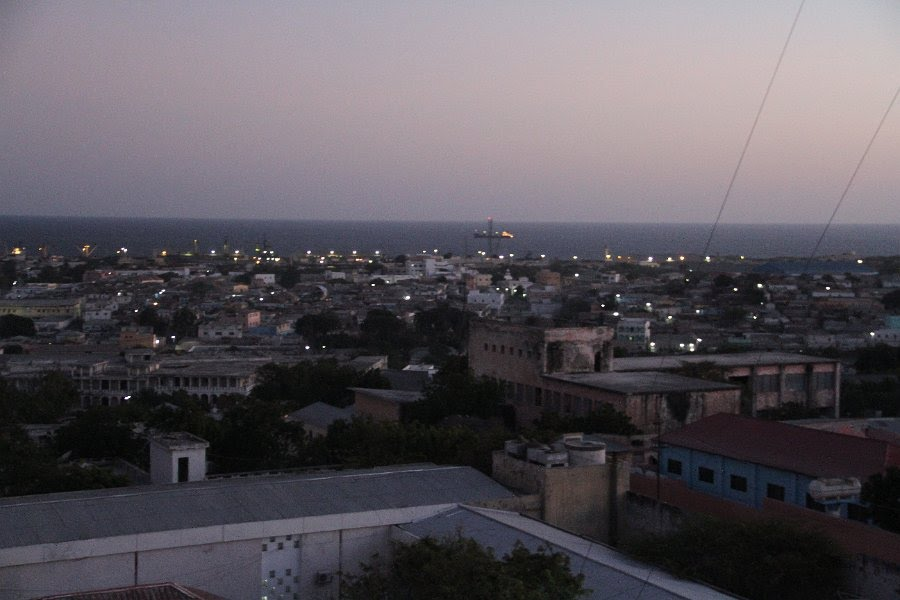
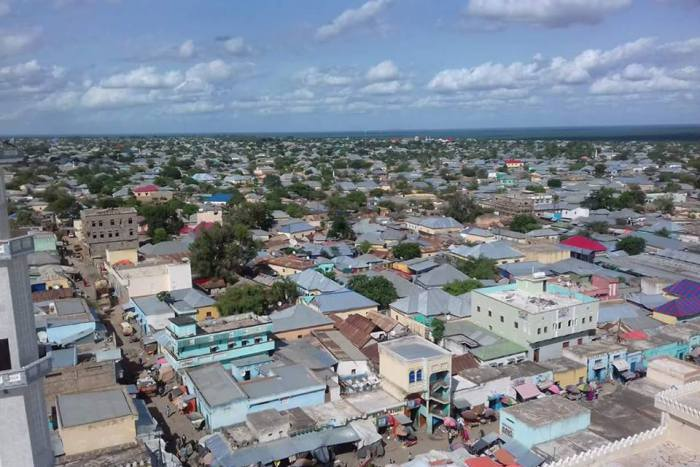
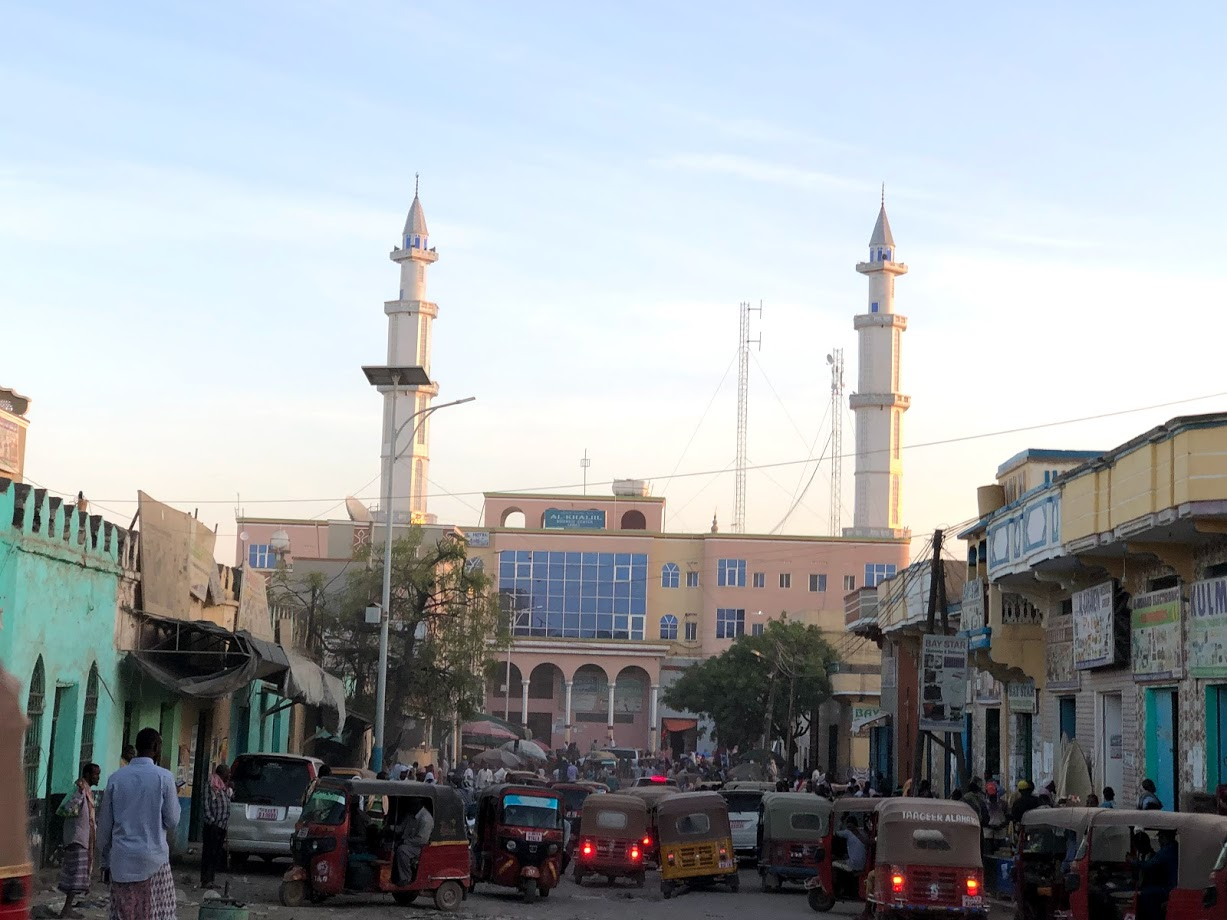
- Nickname: Baydhabo Janaay
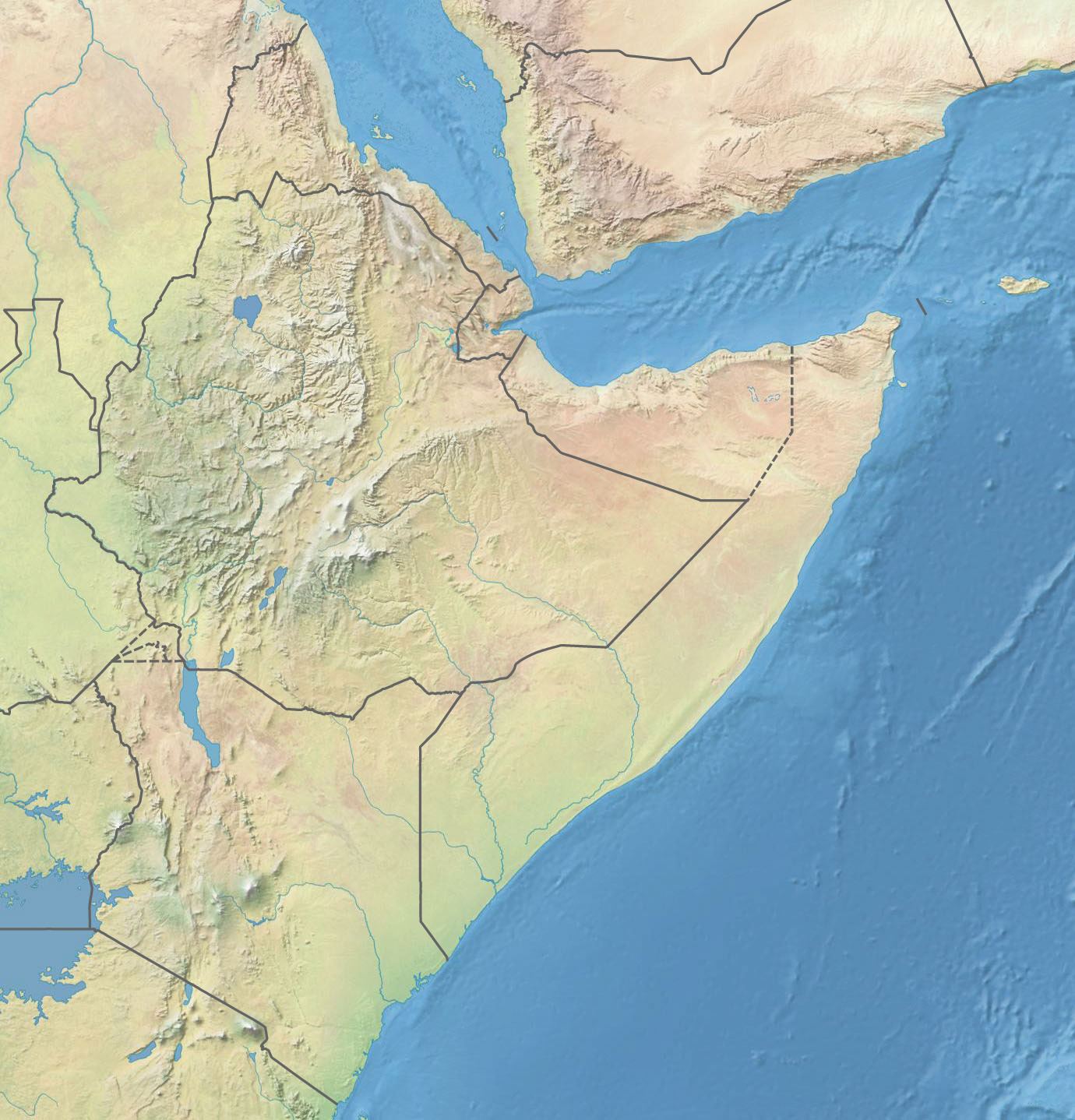
- Location within Somalia Location within the Horn of Africa Location within Africa
- Coordinates: 3°07′00″N 43°39′00″E
- Country: Somalia
- Regional State: South West
- Region: Bay

Government
  - Mayor: Abdullahi Ali Watiin

Population (2025)
  - Total: 1,200,000
- Time zone: UTC+3 (EAT)
- Area code: +252

Baidoa (Arabic: بَيْدَوَا, Somali (Af-Maxaa): Baydhabo, Maay: Baydhowy) is the largest city of the South West State of Somalia.

Between 2002 and 2014, Baidoa was the capital of the South West State. In 2014, the capital was changed to Barawa.

== Overview ==
Baydhabo is the main hub of the Somali inter-riverine region and state capital of Bay Region. It was traditionally known as Baydhabo Janaay (the heavenly Baydhabo) or ll Baydhabo (the spring of Baydhabo). The city was founded at the edge of the main highlands known as magniafulka where the ll springs originate, a prime grazing area. Legend states that a bird pecked the ground with its beak and would signal people to come and discover the pristine land. The shrine of Obo Esherow, the patron Sufi mystic/saint of Baidoa, has been honoured for over four centuries.

== History ==
=== Antiquity ===
Baidoa is located in the inter-riverine region of Somalia. It is the 2nd largest city in south Somalia, only behind Mogadishu, and is the de facto capital of the South-West State (Koonfur Galbeed).

Baidoa and the broader Bay region is home to a number of important ancient sites. Archaeologists have found pre-historic rock art on the city's outskirts, in Buur Heybe.

=== Medieval ===
During the medieval period, Baidoa was founded and settled by the Madanle clan and many traditions link the Ajuran with a people known to Somalis Madanle (Maaanthinle, Madinle, etc.) who were celebrated well-diggers in southern Somalia. Many traditions ascribe Madanle origins to Baidao and were attributed to stone-built rectangular enclosure in the deep interior so far adequately described. Baidoa is said to have solid stone and mortar walls ruins some four foot six inches high in places. This affirms the traditions that Baidoa during Ajuran was a large town and a trading hub center.

=== Early Modern ===
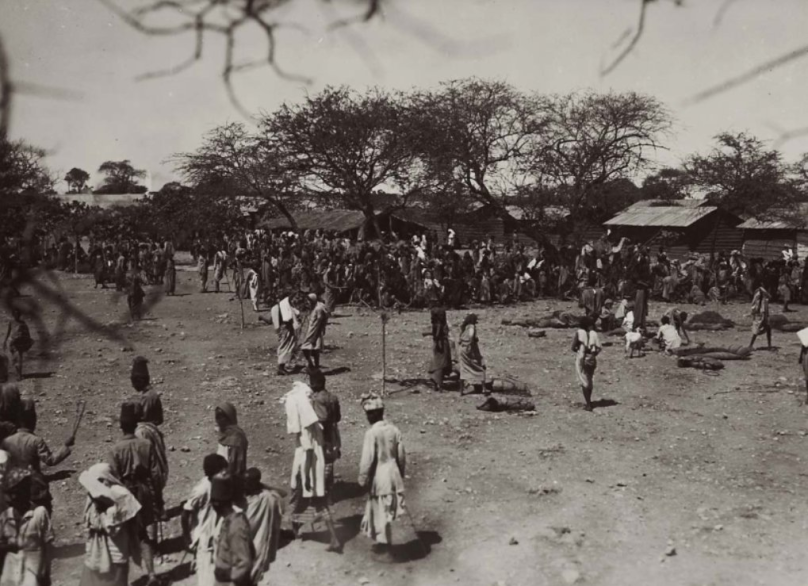
Market of Baidoa, Italian Somaliland, 1925

Baidoa was captured by Sultan Ibrahim Adeer who defeated the Madanle section of Ajuran and expelled them from the region. The city population was eventually replaced by Mirifle and the city reached its golden age under Geledi Sultanate rule. It was crossroads of caravan trade. Baidoa city was surrounded with large walls with one fortified gate. It attracted many merchants and farmers from the benadir coast to settle in what came to be known as Buula Benadir (the Benadir quarter). Menelik II of Ethiopia invaded Baidoa in the late 19th century, but was pushed back under Sultan Osman Ahmed rule.

=== Colonial Period ===
The Italians occupied the city in July 1913. The British military occupation (1941–1950) saw the Bardaale Quarter where Somali clients and employees of the British lived, become the stronghold of the Somali Youth League; the rest of the city was held by the members of the Hizbiya Digil-Mirifle.

=== Modern ===
With an agro-pastoral economy, common livestock include goats and camels, and the main agricultural produce is sorghum. Pre-civil war Bay state was home to the largest camel population in Somalia, with above 1.3 million camels. Post independence, Baidoa attracted international projects such as the Bay Agricultural Development Project.

==== Civil War ====
Baidoa incurred significant damage in the early 1990s, following the start of the civil war. In September 1995, United Somali Congress militia attacked and occupied the town. The Australian contingent of Unified Task Force UNISOM1, running the Baidoa Humanitarian Relief Sector from January 1993, found themselves dealing primarily with the 'Somali Liberation Army' Duduble sub-clan of Aideed's USC. "They were able to provide an ongoing flow of funds to Aideed in Mogadishu from the proceeds of their activities in the Bay region, while enriching themselves in the process." They remained in control of Baidoa until around January 1996, while the local Rahanweyn Resistance Army militia continued to engage the USC in the town's environs. In 1999, the RRA seized control of the wider Lower Shabelle, Gedo, Bay and Bakool provinces. The town and larger region gradually rebounded to become among the more stable areas in the south.

Military positions during the Battle of Baidoa (26 December 2006).

In 2002, the RRA's leader Hasan Muhammad Nur Shatigadud founded the Southwestern State of Somalia regional administration, with its headquarters in Baidoa. The creation of the autonomous state was a move to show the RRA leadership's disaffection with the nascent Mogadishu-based Transitional National Government, which had been established two years earlier. In 2005, the Southwestern State was officially dissolved after its leader Shatigadud had joined the Transitional Federal Parliament in November 2004 and later became minister of finance in January 2005 in the Transitional Federal Government (TFG), the TNG's successor.

In early 2005, the TFG sent official delegations to Baidoa and Jowhar to assess the suitability of each city as a temporary headquarters for the TFG before an eventual relocation of government offices to Mogadishu. In June–July 2005, the Transitional Federal Government established an interim seat in Jowhar due to ongoing insecurity in the capital. To strengthen its presence in the town, the central authorities built an improved airport and inaugurated the Duduble Canal. The TFG later moved its temporary headquarters to Baidoa.

In December 2006, Ethiopian troops entered Somalia to assist the TFG against the advancing Islamic Courts Union, initially winning the Battle of Baidoa. On 28 December 2006, the allied forces recaptured the capital from the ICU. The offensive helped the TFG solidify its rule. On 8 January 2007, for the first time since taking office, President Abdullahi Yusuf Ahmed entered Mogadishu from Baidoa to engage in consultations with local business, religious and civil society representatives as the TFG moved its base to the national capital.

Following its defeat, the Islamic Courts Union splintered into several different factions. Some of the more radical elements, including al-Shabaab, regrouped to continue its insurgency against the TFG and oppose the Ethiopian military's presence in Somalia. Throughout 2007 and 2008, Al-Shabaab scored military victories, seizing control of key towns and ports in both central and southern Somalia. At the end of 2008, the group had captured Baidoa but not Mogadishu. In February 2012, Somali government forces and allied Ethiopian troops re-captured Baidoa from Al-Shabaab.

==== Southwestern State ====
In December 2013, a convention began in Baidoa between Federal Government officials and local representatives with the aim of establishing an autonomous state in the area under the Provision Federal Constitution. Two simultaneous political processes for the establishment of a new Southwestern State of Somalia were underway: one led by former Parliament Speaker Sharif Hassan Sheikh Adan, which proposed a three region state consisting of the Bay, Bakool and Lower Shabelle provinces; another led by convention organizer Malaq Ali Shino, former MP Madobe Nunow Mohamed and erstwhile Bay region Governor Abdifatah Geesey, which proposed instead the re-establishment of a six region Southwestern Somalia state consisting of the Bay, Bakool, Lower Shabelle, Gedo, Middle Jubba and Lower Jubba provinces.

From 2022 to 2023, the region was hit by record-breaking drought.

== Demographics ==
According to the UNDP, the population of Baidoa was 370,000 in 2005 but as of 2025. The Population is estimated to have grown to 1,2 million including IDPs. The city is situated at the center of one of the most densely populated areas in the nation. It is an ethnically and culturally diverse town, with many local residents originating from other parts of the country.

== Maay language ==
Baidoa is the heartland of Maay, an Afro-Asiatic language principally spoken by the Digil and Mirifle (Rahanweyn) clans in the southern regions of Somalia. Its speech area extends from the southwestern border with Ethiopia to a region close to the coastal strip between Mogadishu and Kismayo. Maay is not mutually comprehensible with Standard Somali, and it differs considerably in sentence structure and phonology. However, Maay speakers often use Standard Somali as a lingua franca, which is learned via mass communications, internal migration and urbanization.

== Climate ==
Baidoa has a hot semi-arid climate (Köppen BSh), as with much of southern Somalia. By contrast, towns in the northern part of the country generally have a hot arid climate (Köppen BWh).

Climate data for Baidoa
Month	Jan	Feb	Mar	Apr	May	Jun	Jul	Aug	Sep	Oct	Nov	Dec	Year
Record high °C (°F)	44.0 (111.2)	43.0 (109.4)	43.0 (109.4)	43.0 (109.4)	40.3 (104.5)	39.5 (103.1)	37.0 (98.6)	38.0 (100.4)	39.0 (102.2)	40.0 (104.0)	44.0 (111.2)	45.0 (113.0)	45.0 (113.0)
Mean daily maximum °C (°F)	34.3 (93.7)	35.7 (96.3)	35.8 (96.4)	34.1 (93.4)	31.5 (88.7)	30.4 (86.7)	28.8 (83.8)	29.3 (84.7)	30.8 (87.4)	30.9 (87.6)	31.5 (88.7)	32.9 (91.2)	32.1 (89.8)
Daily mean °C (°F)	27.2 (81.0)	28.0 (82.4)	28.3 (82.9)	27.5 (81.5)	26.1 (79.0)	25.1 (77.2)	24.0 (75.2)	24.3 (75.7)	25.2 (77.4)	25.5 (77.9)	26.1 (79.0)	26.6 (79.9)	26.2 (79.2)
Mean daily minimum °C (°F)	19.9 (67.8)	20.3 (68.5)	20.9 (69.6)	21.0 (69.8)	20.8 (69.4)	20.0 (68.0)	19.3 (66.7)	19.4 (66.9)	19.7 (67.5)	20.4 (68.7)	20.2 (68.4)	20.2 (68.4)	20.2 (68.4)
Record low °C (°F)	14.3 (57.7)	15.4 (59.7)	16.0 (60.8)	15.0 (59.0)	14.0 (57.2)	17.0 (62.6)	15.0 (59.0)	10.0 (50.0)	15.0 (59.0)	15.0 (59.0)	16.0 (60.8)	15.5 (59.9)	10.0 (50.0)
Average rainfall mm (inches)	1 (0.0)	6 (0.2)	23 (0.9)	151 (5.9)	118 (4.6)	12 (0.5)	19 (0.7)	7 (0.3)	13 (0.5)	141 (5.6)	80 (3.1)	14 (0.6)	585 (23.0)
Average rainy days (≥ 0.1 mm)	0	1	3	11	7	3	4	2	2	10	7	2	52
Average relative humidity (%)	59	58	60	70	75	70	71	67	64	72	74	67	67
Mean monthly sunshine hours	288.3	274.0	275.9	228.0	238.7	207.0	161.2	207.7	219.0	192.2	237.0	275.9	2,804.9
Mean daily sunshine hours	9.3	9.7	8.9	7.6	7.7	6.9	5.2	6.7	7.3	6.2	7.9	8.9	7.7
Percentage possible sunshine	78	81	73	62	63	56	42	55	60	52	66	75	64
Source 1: Deutscher Wetterdienst
Source 2: Food and Agriculture Organization: Somalia Water and Land Management (percent sunshine)

== Education ==
Baidoa has a large secondary school with around 580 graduates in 2008. As of 2012, several other high schools were in development.

Tertiary education in the city is served by the University of Southern Somalia. After a considerable planning stage, the institution was established in 2007 by a group of Somali scholars and intellectuals. Inaugural classes began the following year, in August 2008. University representatives concurrently announced plans to develop four colleges: the College of Science, Agriculture, and Engineering, the College of Social Science, the College of Education, the College of Health and Environmental Sciences, and the College of Jurisprudence. Additionally, an Institute of Social Research is being developed. Plans are also in the works to construct a new campus in an area around 15 km north of Baidoa, as well as two new branches in two other principal cities in the Bay region.

Schools:

- Sahal moalin ise primary and secondary school
- Baidoa Secondary and primary school
- AlBasha'ir primary and secondary school
- Alqalam primary and secondary school
- Baidoa model primary and secondary school
- Hanano Community Primary and Secondary school
- Ma'ruf Primary and Secondary School
- Alcayn primary and secondary school
- Almacrifa primary and secondary school
- Ma'mur primary and secondary school
- AlHudda Primary and secondary school
- Alabraar primary and secondary school
- Baydhabo Janaay primary and secondary school
- Salaam Institute of language and health Science
- Alnajuum tertiary and primary school
- Salaxudin primary and secondary school
- City Model School

== Transportation ==
Air transportation in Baidoa is served by the Baidoa Airport. Sitting at an elevation of 1,520 feet (463 m), it has a 9843 × 131 ft (3000 × 40 m) asphalt runway. The airport has very little fuel services, a terminal building, storage container, on-site warehouse, and radio towers.

== Subdivisions ==
Baidoa is administratively divided into four districts:

- Isha
- Horseed
- Berdaale
- Howlwadaag
- Daru salaam
- Salaamey
- Towfiiq
- Wadajir
- Waaberi
- Ideedi

== Notable residents ==
- Hasan Muhammad Nur Shatigadud – former minister of finance of Somalia and Rahanweyn Resistance Army leader
- Sharif Hassan Sheikh Aden – Somali politician
- Said Ali Hussein – Somali footballer; emigrated to the Netherlands as a result of the Somali Civil War.
- Ibrahim Hussein abdirahaman known as Fuudjeelle, -the Somali Social Positivism Union and the Pressure Group founder;
- Ilhan Omar – American politician; lived in Baidoa prior to the Somali Civil War

== See also ==
- Battle of Baidoa Somalia Rahanweyn
