= South West State of Somalia =

State in Somalia

Coordinates: 3.8642°N 43.4181°E

South West State of Somalia: Dawlad Goboleedka Koonfur Galbeed (Somali); ولاية جنوب غرب الصومال (Arabic); Dowléd Gopéleedké Koofur Orsé(Somali-Maay)
- Flag Coat of arms

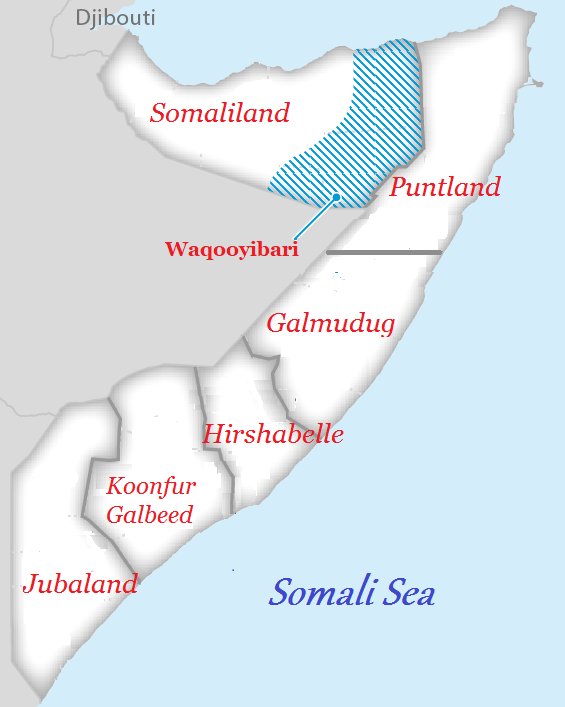
- On this map, the South West State of Somalia is labeled "Koonfur Galbeed".
- Capital: Barawe (de jure); Baidoa (de facto)
- Largest city: Baidoa
- Official languages: Somali (Af-Maay Dialect); Arabic
- Ethnic groups: Somalis; Benadiri people
- Religion: Islam
- Demonym: Somali
- Government: Federated presidential state
  - Leader: Aden Madobe

Establishment
  - Established: 1 April 2002

Area
  - Total: 100,000 km^{2} (39,000 sq mi) (3rd state of somalia)

Population
  - 2022 estimate: 4,154,257
- GDP (PPP): 2018 estimate
  - Total: $5,895,765
- HDI (2012): 0.2 low
- Currency: Somali shilling
- Calling code: +252
- Internet TLD: .so

The South West State of Somalia (Somali: Koonfur Galbeed, Maay: Koofur Orsé) is a federal member state in southwestern Somalia. It was founded by Hasan Muhammad Nur Shatigadud, leader of the Somalia RRA on 1 April 2002. It was the third autonomous region to be established.

After its dissolution in 2005, the territory was re-established in November 2009 as an official federal member state of Somalia. Sharif Hassan was selected the president of this state. The official capital of South-West state is Barawa, located on the coast of the Somali Sea, though the state administration is currently based in Baidoa.

== Location and name ==
The South West state is bordered to the north by Ethiopia, to the west by Jubaland, to the east by Hirshabelle, and to the south by the Somali Sea. To the southeast, it is also bordered by Banaadir, whose administrative status was unclear during the 2010s.

During its development phase, the regional state was called the Interim South West Administration. Its full name was the South West State of Somalia and, in Somali, Maamul Goboleedka Koonfur Galbeed. In the local Maay Maay language it is referred to as Koofur Orsi. An individual from Koofur Orsi is called a Koofur Orsian.

== History ==
=== Background ===
During the pre-independence period, when the Koofur Orsi or Koonfur-Galbeed region was administered by the United Nations Trusteeship, the majority segment population of Digil and Mirifle were the only major Somali demographic whose political groups and spokesmen voiced apprehension about a centralized unitary republic. Many of these spokesmen voiced a preference for some form of confederalism or federalism. Several decades after independence, opposition to Siad Barre's Hantiwadaag (socialist) government grew. When in 1990 the three major opposition factions of SPM, USC, and SNM met in Ethiopia and put forth an informal accord in favor of federalism, many civil servants from the Konfuur-Galbeed region argued that, in retrospect, the predecessors in their region were correct. In 1992, the blockage of aid supplies from the coast to the Konfuur-Galbeed region meant that many viewed the famine as man-made. This increased support for federalism. One form of criticism that was levelled at the Konfuur-Galbeed administration during its early development is that some of its functional facets hearkened back to the negative aspects of the era of the historically conterminous Geledi. The latter's tributary status was believed to inculcate subordinacy rather than self-sufficiency, an administration that was oligarchical rather than egalitarian, and too much contrast with the historically British Jubaland to its west and south.

=== Contemporary ===
The territory known as the Southwestern State of Somalia (Somali: Dowlad Goboleedka Koonfur-Galbeed ee Soomaaliya), or locally Koofur Orsi, was originally intended to consist of six Somali administrative regions: (gobollo): Bay, Bakool, Middle Jubba (Jubbada Dhexe), Lower Shabelle (Shabeellada Hoose), Gedo and Lower Jubba (Jubbada Hoose). The establishment of the autonomous state was intended to express the disaffection of the Somalia State with the nascent Mogadishu-based Transitional National Government. It was also intended to counter the influence of the Somalia Reconciliation and Restoration Council in the same regions. In 2005, the state was dissolved after its leader Shatigadud had joined the Transitional Federal Parliament in November 2004. He became Minister of Finance in January 2005 in the Transitional Federal Government, successor to the Transitional National Government.

The coast of Koofur Orsi is primarily settled by Biimaal clan, but also the Barwani, other coastal Banadiri communities, and the Sheekhaal. The interior and the bulk of Koofur Orsi are populated mainly by the Rahanweyn clan, who are located between the Hawiye to the east in Hirshabelle, and the Marehan and other Darod clans to the west in Jubaland.

On 17 March 2026, the state severed ties with the federal government over issues related to Somalia's ongoing constitutional crisis and allegations by State President Abdiaziz Laftagareen of an attempted coup against him by federal forces. Commercial flights between Mogadishu and Baidoa have been halted, but humanitarian flights continue. Somalian federal forces would recapture Baidoa on March 30, stating that the city "looks like a ghost town" and prompting the regional leader's resignation.

== Politics ==
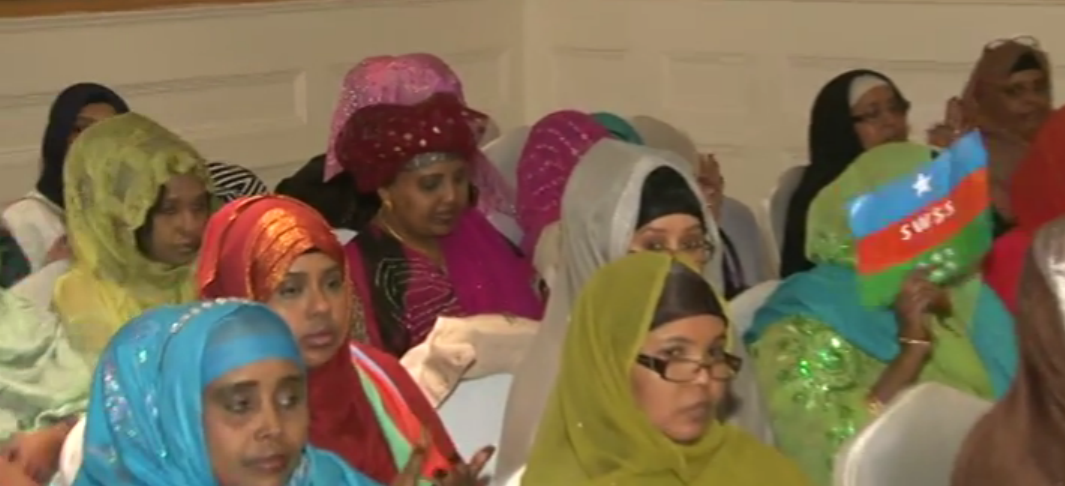
Women at a political function in support of the Southwestern State of Somalia administration (March 2009)

=== Conventions ===
In December 2013, a convention began in Baidoa between Federal Government officials and local representatives with the aim of establishing an autonomous state in the area under the Provision Federal Constitution. Two simultaneous political processes for the establishment of a new Southwestern State of Somalia were underway: one led by former Parliament Speaker Sharif Hassan Sheikh Adan, which proposed a three-region state consisting of the Bay, Bakool and Lower Shabelle provinces; another led by traditional elders of Digil Mirifle, which proposed instead the re-establishment of a six-region Southwestern Somalia state consisting of the Bay, Bakool and Lower Shabelle, Gedo, Middle Jubba and Lower Jubba provinces.

=== Presidency ===
On 3 March 2014, Ali Hassan Abdirahman was elected president by supporters of the six-region state proposal. Internal and Federal Affairs Minister Abdullahi Godah Barre indicated that the Somali federal government would not recognize the six-region convention outcome, as it contravenes an earlier Jubba agreement signed in Addis Ababa between the Somali federal authorities and the autonomous Jubbaland administration in southwestern Somalia. The Jubba agreement stipulates that Jubaland's constituent provinces are instead to be administered by the Jubaland regional authorities. Addressing the 425th meeting of the AU Peace and Security Council on 25 March 2014, UN Special Representative for Somalia Nicholas Kay similarly indicated that he would continue to work closely with the AU, EU and IGAD to support a Somali federal government-led three-region state formation process for the southwestern provinces.

On 27 March 2014, 733 delegates in Baidoa representing the Bay, Bakool and Lower Shabelle regions elected Mohamed Haji Abdinur as president of the Southwestern State of Somalia. Abdinur is a veteran politician and a close ally of former Parliament Speaker Sharif Hassan Sheikh Adan. Of the representatives that took part in the three-region state elections, 723 voted in favor of Abdinur while 10 abstained.

On 30 March 2014, the President of Somalia Hassan Sheikh Mohamud visited Baidoa to defuse political tension between the two competing Southwestern State delegations. The autonomous Puntland regional administration in northeastern Somalia issued a statement the following day congratulating Abdinur on his election as president of the Southwestern State. The Puntland State House also expressed support for the three-region state process in Baidoa and indicated that the Puntland authorities were prepared to provide technical and experience-related assistance to the nascent federal state.

== Allotment ==
On 22 June 2014, the federal government concluded its mediation between the supporters of the parallel three-region and six-region processes for a new Southwestern State of Somalia. Wings from both sides had reportedly reached an agreement on the prospective regional state's formation. On 23 June 2014, the office of Federal Parliament Speaker Mohamed Osman Jawari hosted an event announcing the merger of the two competing administrations into a single three-region state, which is to be composed of the Bay, Bakool and Lower Shabelle provinces.

== Koofur Galbeed administration ==
=== Establishment ===
On 23 June 2014, President of Somalia Hassan Sheikh Mohamud, Prime Minister Abdiweli Sheikh Ahmed, and Parliament Speaker Mohamed Osman Jawari oversaw a ceremony in Mogadishu marking the merger of the two competing administrations into a single three-region state, which is to be composed of the Bay, Bakool and Lower Shabelle provinces. The pact stipulates that the new polity will be led by an Interim South West Administration consisting of representatives from both sides. According to an official press communique, the opposing sides are slated to form a thirteen-member technical committee, appointing five members apiece to the body alongside three members selected by the Federal Government. The panel is then within ten days scheduled to prepare a roadmap for the interim administration's formation. Additionally, the Federal Government is to facilitate consultations between the Interim South West Administration and Jubaland over mutual concerns and interests. The UN Special Representative for Somalia Nicholas Kay, the UN Secretary-General Ban Ki-moon, the Special Representative of the Chairperson of the African Union Mission Commission for Somalia Mahamat Saleh Annadif, and the U.S. Special Representative for Somalia James P. McAnulty all welcomed the Southwestern State of Somalia agreement, commended the principals on their constructive consultations, acknowledged the Federal Government's key role in facilitating the talks, and pledged to continue supporting the local post-conflict reconstruction process. On 25 June 2014, the federal cabinet unanimously approved the signed accord.

On 16 July 2014, the establishment of the Technical Committee on Formation of Interim South West Administration was announced and endorsed at a formal ceremony in Mogadishu. The panel is to be supported by a group of federal ministers under the authority of the Prime Minister.

In September 2014, Parliament Speaker Mohamed Osman Jawari and UN Special Representative for Somalia Nicholas Kay visited Baidoa to finalize talks over the South West state's formation. Jawari subsequently announced that a reconciliation conference would be held in the city on 14 September to unify the competing three-region and six-region local administrations. Prime Minister Abdiweli Sheikh Ahmed opened the summit, which was attended by Lower Shabelle, Bay and Bakool provincial representatives, clan elders and politicians.

In October 2014, President Mohamud opened a state formation conference in Baidoa for the three-region Southwestern State of Somalia. The UN-financed summit was attended by 380 delegates from the state's constituent Bay, Bakool and Lower Shabelle provinces, as well as UN Envoy to Somalia Nicholas Kay, IGAD Envoy to Somalia Mohamed Abdi Affey, and the Ambassador of Denmark to Somalia, among other officials. On 7 November 2014, the Southwestern State of Somalia was established, following the conclusion of the two-week Baidoa conference. The delegates from the new regional state's constituent Bay, Bakool and Lower Shabelle provinces unanimously agreed to make Barawe its capital. They also approved a new regional state constitution. On 17 November 2014, former Parliament Speaker Sharif Hassan Sheikh Adan was elected President of the three-region Southwestern State of Somalia.

On 17 December 2014, the six-region South West Somalia administration joined the finalized three-region South West Somalia administration. The merger came after a power-sharing agreement signed in Baidoa between both sides, which stipulates that the South West Somalia six-region's leadership will be granted the new federal state's vice president and parliament speaker positions.

On 30 December 2014, South West State President Sharif Hassan Sheikh Adan and Jubaland President Ahmed Mohamed Islam (Madobe) signed a four-point Memorandum of Understanding on federalization, security, the 2016 general elections, trade, and the constitution. The bilateral accord was signed in the presence of representatives from the two regional states, including politicians, traditional leaders and civil society activists. Among the clauses of the accord were equitable allocation of international assistance by the federal authorities, agreeing on pre-civil war boundaries and regional demarcations established by the military government, and recommending that the federal authorities both delegate powers to regional bodies and adopt a No Objection Policy. Additionally, the memorandum stipulates that the two regional states will form a security committee consisting of representatives from both administrations, which will facilitate launching joint counterinsurgency operations, extradition, and expertise and intelligence sharing. The two administrations also proposed the creation of an interstate commission to liaise between the federal government and constituent regional states. They likewise indicated that their respective Chambers of Commerce would buttress commercial exchanges and cross-border trade.

== Elections ==
As a part of the continuing federalization processes of Somalia and fostering local democracy, the South West State has planned to have own presidential elections on 17 November 2018. It is first time the people of Southwestern State to have the opportunity to elect their leader. The election is an expression of the political will of the Somali people in the state.

The incumbent president is determined to cling to power but there was growing opposition against him. Where the Federal Government of Somalia wanted their handpicked candidate to win the election at any cost. Over 10 independents candidates have created Council of Change, umbrella uniting all candidates except the incumbent and the Government sponsored candidate. However, the election process was tainted and hindered by politically motivated actions of both the Federal Government of Somalia and the interim SW administration. The following events have thrown the Southwestern State election into disarray:

1. The increasing tension between Federal Government of Somalia and Federal Member States has adversely affected the election process.
2. The Federal Government's ill-advised action targeting Sheikh Mukhtar Robow with the intention to eliminate him from the electoral process.
3. Prolonged delays in forming the election committee.
4. Twin bombing on 13 October in Baidoa targeting venues affiliated with two independent candidates which as many as 30 people was killed.
5. The resignation of 15 members of the election committee including the chairman, his deputy and secretariat citing deep dismay over interference by the Federal Government of Somalia in the process.
6. The absence of election ant-corruption committee despite asking ISWA several occasions.
7. Abrupt resignation of the President of the South West State Sharif Hassan Sheikh Adan and his decision not to run for the presidential seat, succumbing pressure from the Federal Government of Somalia.

The elections, which were initially slated for 17 November was postponed to 28 November. It was then pushed further back to 5 December and once again it has been postponed to 19 December becoming the 4th time.

Mukhtar Robow was officially cleared by the South West State Electoral Commission to contest in the December elections despite early protest by the Federal government seeking to have him barred. The Coalition for Change, which has thrown its weight behind Mukhtar Robow, issued a statement after the polls were postponed. The group said it fears the government is planning to rig because the new date is not favourable for international observers as most of them will then have left Somalia for the end of the year festivities.

Some 150 elite Somali forces, armed to the tooth with some really heavy calibre machine guns, were deployed to Baidoa to physically block Robow from accessing the election venue.

On 7 Nov 2018 The United Nations Mission in Somalia (UNSOM) warned of presidential election in Somalia's South West State have the potential to lead to violence and called on all parties to ensure that the electoral process proceeds in accordance with the established rules and avoids any behaviour which may lead to conflict or undermine the integrity of the electoral process.

Mukhtar Robow was then invited to a security brief by African Union peacekeepers from Ethiopia on Thursday 13 December. He was then forcibly abducted, transferred to the custody of the National Intelligence and Security Agency (Somalia) and flown to Mogadishu under tight security. At least 12 people were killed in Baidoa in violence that erupted following Robow's arrest. Among those killed was a member of the regional parliament. The victims were shot by AMISOM Ethiopian forces and Somali Special Forces flown from Mogadishu. Somali lawmakers have written a protest letter to the AU Commission in Addis Ababa, the Ethiopian government and the UN complaining about the conduct of AMISOM. His arrest also prompted the resignation of Somalia's Public Works Minister Abdifatah Mohamed Gesey, who hails from Baidoa and is from the same Leysan sub-clan as Robow, to resign in protest.

Abdiaziz Laftagareen was on 19 December 2018, elected President of South West State in an arranged sham election that was predetermined and rigged in his favour. The Ethiopian contingent of the African peacekeepers provided security during the voting. It was alleged approximately $15 million to $20 million of Qatar funding was spent on this sham process.

On 1 January 2019 Somalia declared the UN's chief diplomat, the Special Representative of the UN Secretary-General, Nicholas Haysom,‘persona non grata’. The accusation was that interference in a sovereign state's internal affairs after Haysom wrote to the Government questioning the legality of the arrest of Mukhtar Robow and Police killing of 15 protesters. Just hours before the Somali government's letter of expulsion was released to the media, two U.N. staff members and a contractor were injured after seven mortars landed inside the U.N. compound in the Somali capital, Mogadishu. In a statement the UN Security Council is deeply regretted the Government's decision.

== Koofur Orsi composition ==
As of March 2015, the Koofur Orsi State of Somalia's executive branch of government is composed of:

President

- Sharif Hassan Sheikh Adan
- Vice president
- Mohamed Hassan Fiqi

Cabinet Ministers

- Minister of Interior – Abdirahman Ibrahim Adan
- Minister of Finance – Hassan Ibraahim Lugbur
- Minister of Agriculture – Mohamed Hassan Fiqi
- Minister of Justice – Ahmed Sheik Hassan
- Minister for Security – Abdifatah Geesey
- Minister for Disarmament and Rehabilitation of Militias – Hassan Hussein Mohamed
- Minister for Petroleum and Energy – Salim Haji Hassan Osman
- Minister for Ports and Marine Transport – Abdulkadir Sharif Sheekhuuna
- Minister for Planning and International Cooperation – Abdinaasir Abdi Arush
- Minister for Health – Isak Ali Subad
- Minister for Education – Salad Mohamed Noor Aliyow
- Minister for Culture, Higher Education and Technology – Hassan Ibrahim Hassan
- Minister for Information – Hassan Abdi Mohamed
- Minister of Posts and Telecommunications – Mohamed Omar Zaytun
- Minister for Youth and Sports – Abdullah Abdi Omar Fanax
- Minister of Commerce and Industry – Abdullahi Sheikh Hassan
- Minister for Resettlement and Diaspora Affairs – Ahmed Noor Mohammed Lohos
- Minister of Constitutional Affairs and Reconciliation – Abdulkadir Noor Arale
- Minister for Tourism and Wildlife – Omar Hassan Aden
- Minister for the Environment – Mohamud Mohamed (Ma'alim Jiis)
- Minister for Religious Affairs – Ahmed Mohamed Barre
- Minister for Labour and Labourers – Jeylaani Sheikh Mohamed Hassan
- Minister for Mining and Water Resources – Aden Mohamed Hassan
- Minister for Humanitarian Affairs and Disabled Care – Abdullahi Muse Abukar
- Minister for Women and Family Affairs – Fatuma Omar Abuu
- Minister for Air Transport and Airports – Abdullahi Adan Balch
- Minister for Veterinary – Madoobe Nuunow Mohamed
- Minister for Fisheries and Marine Resources – Mohamud Hussein Aliyow
- Minister for Works and Reconstruction – Abdullahi Ahmed Mohamed

State Ministers

- State Minister for Presidential – Mohamed Abdullahi Mursal
- State Minister for Justice – Ahmed Abdullahi Hussein
- State Minister for Finance – Ismail Adan Diriye
- State Minister for Cooperation – Saiida Sheikh
- State Minister for Interior and Local Government – Mohamed Abdi Adan
- State Minister for Security – Mohamed Shiekh

Deputy Ministers

- Deputy Minister for Justice – Jibril Shiekh
- Deputy Minister for Religious Affairs – Adan Mohamed Osman
- Deputy Minister for Education – Engr Abdifatah Isak Mohamed
- Deputy Minister for Planning – Mohamed Hajji
- Deputy Minister for Interior and Local Government – Hussein Ali Haji
- Deputy Minister for Agriculture – Aweys Hussein Moalim
- Deputy Minister for Energy and Petroleum –
- Deputy Minister for Information – Aabea Aawow Suufi Hajji Afaan
- Deputy Minister for Higher Education – Mohamed Abdullahi Mohamed
- Deputy Minister for Environment – Adan Maamow
- Deputy Minister Commerce – Abuukar Moalim Ali
- Deputy Minister for Disabled People – Mohamed Olow Gaani
- Deputy Minister for Youth and Sports – Abdikadir Noor

Committees

- Security Committee – five ministers

In March 2015, the South West State's Minister of Tourism and Wildlife Omar Adan Hassan announced that his ministry would renovate hotels that had been run by the central government in the Southwestern State's three constituent provinces. Among the state properties scheduled for refurbishment are the Mayow, Sanguuni and Hotel Panorama. Additionally, the minister indicated that his administration was establishing game reserves and ranges to safeguard wildlife, and would launch public awareness drives against hunting.

=== Office ===
In April 2015, a new state palace for the interim South West State administration was inaugurated in Baidoa. The launch event was chaired by ISWS President Sharif Hassan, and was attended by ISWS leaders, civil society representatives and politicians.

== Flag ==
In 2002, the reconstituted South West State of Somalia adopted a new regional state flag.

== Transportation ==
In March 2015, construction started on a new airport in Barawe. Engineers began surveying land-plots in the southern part of the city, with the facility to be erected near the shore. The workers also measured roads between the airport and the South West State's administrative capital. In May 2015, South West State president Sharif Hassan Sheikh Adan also announced that his administration would relaunch the K50 Airstrip in the regional state.
