= Sharif Hassan Sheikh Aden =

Somali politician

- شريف حسن الشيخ آدم
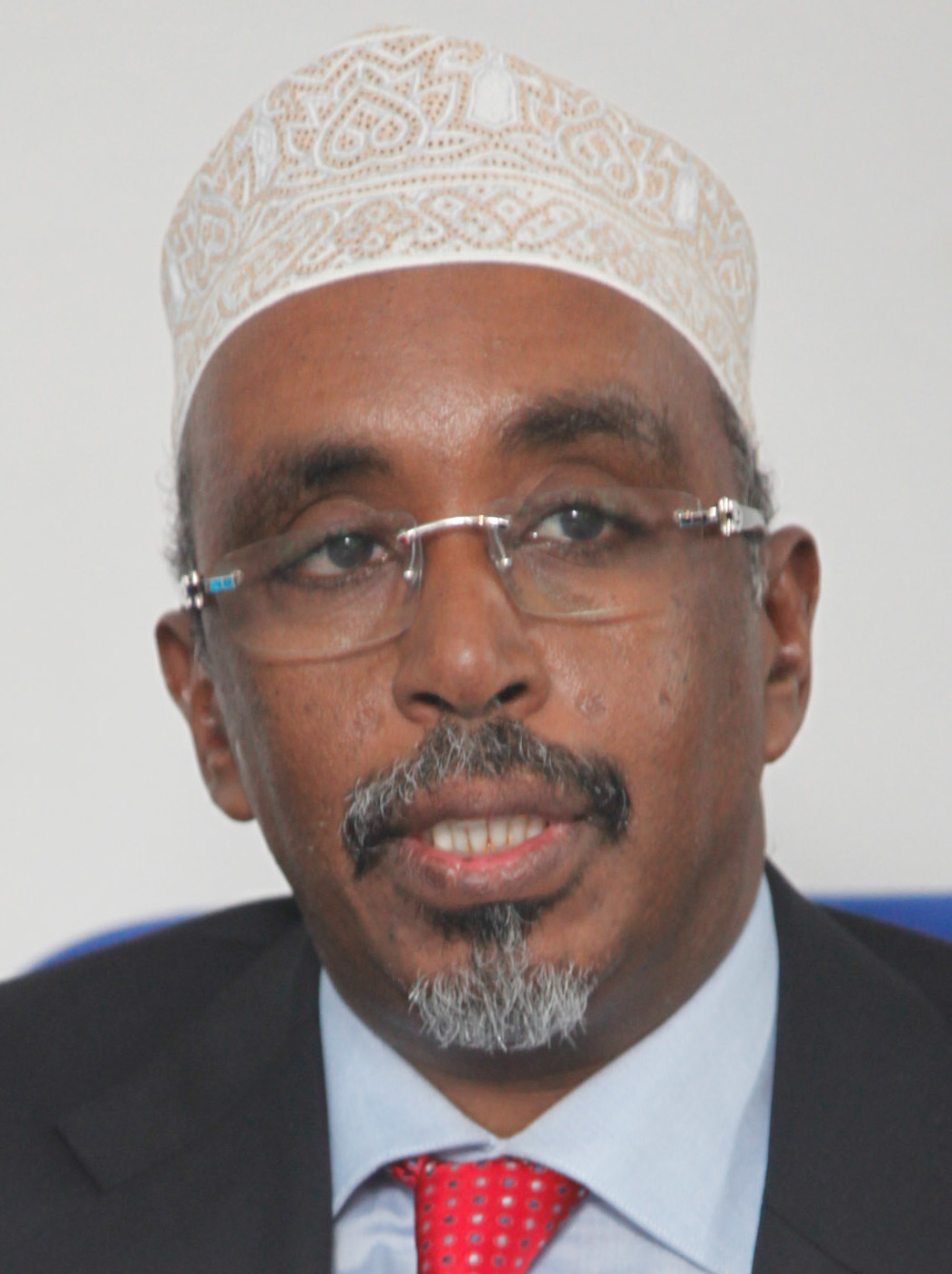

9th & 11th Speaker of the Parliament of Somalia
- In office 25 May 2010 – 20 August 2012
- Preceded by: Nur Hassan Hussein
- Succeeded by: Muse Hassan Abdulle (Acting)
- In office 15 September 2004 – 17 January 2007
- Preceded by: Position established
- Succeeded by: Adan Mohamed Nuur Madobe

Leader of South West State of Somalia
- In office 3 December 2014 – 7 November 2018
- Preceded by: Madobe Nunow
- Succeeded by: Abdulkadir Sharif Shekhuna Maye (acting); Abdiaziz Laftagareen

Personal details
- Born: 1 July 1954 (age 72) Berdale, Somalia
- Party: Independent
- Religion: Islam

Sharif Hassan Sheikh Adan (Somali: Shariif Xasan Sheekh Aadan, Arabic: شريف حسن الشيخ آدم) is a Somali politician. He is a former Minister of Finance of Somalia, and the last speaker of the Transitional Federal Parliament (TFP).

== Career ==
=== Speaker of Parliament (1st term) ===
In 2005, Sheikh Sharif Hassan was opposed to the establishment of a new capital in Jowhar, which was the preference of President Abdullahi Yusuf Ahmed and Prime Minister Ali Mohammed Ghedi, demanding the capital be returned to Mogadishu. Baidoa was selected as a compromise location.

On October 6, 2005, he was quoted as saying, "In my view, Ethiopia does not want a functioning government in Somalia and I want to see that the world knows this. Even if Ethiopia does want a government here, it wants a fiefdom government - multiple governments which are all weak."

On January 17, 2007, the Parliament voted to oust him due to his opposition of a peacekeeping force for Somalia and his expressions of support and unauthorized meetings with the Islamic Courts Union (ICU) which acted against the Transitional Federal Government (TFG) and his opposition to Ethiopian intervention in the 2006–2009 Somali War, with 183 votes against him, eight in favor and one abstention. Justice Minister Adan Mohamed Nuur became his successor in Parliamentary elections on January 31, 2007, and sworn in on February 3, 2007.

=== Finance Minister ===
On February 20, 2009, Sharif Hassan was appointed the Minister of Finance and Deputy Prime Minister of Somalia by Prime Minister Omar Abdirashid Ali Sharmarke.

=== Speaker of Parliament (2nd term) ===
==== Election ====
On May 25, 2010, Sharif Hassan was re-elected speaker of the Transitional Federal Government's Parliament.

==== Stand-off ====
On October 14, 2010, President of Somalia Sheikh Sharif Sheikh Ahmed appointed former First Secretary in the Somali embassy in Washington, Mohamed Abdullahi Mohamed, as the nation's new Prime Minister. A row between Speaker of Parliament Sharif Hassan and the President then developed over whether the scheduled vote of confidence on Mohamed's nomination should be decided by a show of hands or via a secret ballot. Sharif Hassan favored a secret ballot while Sharif Ahmed preferred hand-raising, with the deciding voting session repeatedly postponed. The Supreme Court of Somalia subsequently ruled that the vote should be conducted by a show of hands, consistent with how previous confirmation votes in parliament had been decided since 1960. A delegation from the UN, AU and IGAD, including the Special Envoy to Somalia, also flew in to attempt to help resolve the impasse. On October 31, 2010, the vote of confidence was held, with lawmakers overwhelmingly approving Mohamed's appointment as Prime Minister. 297 of the 392 Members of Parliament endorsed the selection via hand-raising; 92 MPs voted against and 3 abstained. United Nations Secretary-General Ban Ki-moon also issued a statement commending the Somali leadership for having reached a consensus on procedural arrangements that facilitated a transparent and consultative confirmation of the new Premier.

==== Kampala Accord ====
After months of political infighting between the Speaker of Parliament Sharif Hassan and President Sharif Ahmed over whether to hold presidential elections in August 2011, the two politicians struck a deal in Kampala on June 9, 2011, to postpone the vote for a new president and parliamentary speaker for one year in exchange for the resignation of the Premier within a period of thirty days. Overseen by the Ugandan President Yoweri Museveni and the U.N. Special Envoy to Somalia Augustine Mahiga, the signed Kampala Accord would also see the well-regarded technocratic Cabinet that Prime Minister Mohamed had assembled in November 2010 re-composed to make way for a new government.

Announcement of Prime Minister Mohamed's proposed resignation was immediately met with protests in various cities. Thousands of civilians, many government soldiers, and some legislators marched through the streets of Mogadishu, calling for the dismissal of the President, the Parliament Speaker and the Parliament. The crowd also demanded that the Premier be reinstated and described Mohamed as the "only honest leader in recent years". Posters of the UN Special Envoy were symbolically burned, with protestors appealing to the UN Secretary General to dismiss Mahiga due to what many felt was the latter's infringement on Somalia's sovereignty through his signing of the Kampala agreement. Attacks on hotels in which members of parliament were staying and at least five deaths were also reported. Additional demonstrations against the Premier's resignation were held in Galkacyo, a key trading city in the north-central Mudug region, as well as in Belet Hawo in the far south. Internationally, protests also reportedly took place in Cairo, Nairobi, Johannesburg, Sydney, London, Rome, Stockholm, Minneapolis and Toronto.

In response, Prime Minister Mohamed released a statement through the state-run Radio Mogadishu commending the military for its rapid response and urging its troops to exercise restraint. He also appealed to the public to calm down, and indicated that "I have seen your expressions and heard your calls[...] You are part of the decision making — what you want must be heard." Additionally, in a press conference, the Premier called for the immediate release of all protestors who had been detained, and stated that his administration would launch an independent investigation into their arrest. Weighing in on the demonstrations, Mogadishu's Mayor Mohamed Nur suggested that "what [the demonstrators] have a problem with is that two people go and decide the fate of this government without considering the feelings of this population", and that putting the issue before Parliament for approval is a more democratic course of action.

On June 11, 2011, Prime Minister Mohamed released a statement indicating that the Kampala decision ought to be presented in Parliament for debate and appraised according to the laws stipulated in the national constitution. The Premier also stated that he would only step down if lawmakers voted to uphold the accord. This was echoed by the Cabinet, which indicated in a press release that, after having convened to discuss the Kampala decision, the Ministers agreed that the accord must be put before Parliament for evaluation. In addition, over 200 parliamentarians reportedly sought to urge the Prime Minister to reconvene Parliament so as to deliberate the decision, indicating in a separate statement that the accord deprived MPs of their legislative role vis-a-vis the government.

On June 12, 2011, President Sharif Ahmed released a statement wherein he condemned the protests, describing them as "illegal". He also suggested that some government officials were financing the rallies in Mogadishu, and warned that the Al-Shabaab group of Islamists that is waging war against the federal government could try to exploit the gatherings to launch terrorist attacks.

The same day, news reports surfaced indicating that UN Secretary-General Ban Ki-moon would sack Special Envoy Augustine Mahiga on account of a lack of tangible progress made and public confidence in Mahiga's work in Somalia. UN sources also stated that, due to prevalent allegations of graft, the Secretary General would fire half of the senior staff in various UN bureaus, including the UNPOS, UNDP, UNICEF, WHO and OCHA.

In an interview on June 16, 2011, Undersecretary for Foreign Affairs of Italy, Alfredo Mantica, expressed support for Prime Minister Mohamed's position with regard to the Kampala agreement. Mantica stated that the Italian government believed that the accord ought to be reviewed in Parliament. He also indicated that "the prime minister has been in office five months. And [it is too] early to judge his work. But what he has done so far has been very positive. It has achieved important results. The government already seemed a miracle[...] The strength of the instability in Somalia is a constant. And the prime minister represents stability."

On June 19, 2011, Mohamed Abdullahi Mohamed resigned from his position as Prime Minister of Somalia. Part of the controversial Kampala Accord's conditions, the agreement would also see the mandates of the President, the Parliament Speaker and Deputies extended until August 2012, after which point new elections are to be organized. In his farewell speech, Prime Minister Mohamed indicated that he was stepping down in "the interest of the Somali people and the current situation in Somalia". He also thanked his Cabinet for its efforts in improving the security situation and the standards of governance in the country.

Abdiweli Mohamed Ali, Mohamed's former Minister of Planning and International Cooperation, was appointed Acting Premier later the same day. A few days later, on June 23, 2011, Ali was named permanent Prime Minister.

Prime Minister Mohamed's resignation was immediately met with anger by the general public and many lawmakers. Apprehension regarding a possible resurgence of governmental corruption and lassitude, long-standing problems which Mohamed's administration had made significant strides toward eradicating, were cited as primary reasons for the consternation. According to one legislator, many policy-makers are trying to repeal the Kampala decision, as it also "subject[s] the country to trusteeship." Another MP indicated that "lawmakers are united in their opposition to the deal" and "will object [to] it until we throw it away".

Observers have suggested that Mohamed's resignation could offer militants an opportunity to capitalize on the situation and set back the territorial gains made by his administration in the ongoing insurgency in southern Somalia. They have also opined that firing the Premier would not resolve the long-standing power struggle between President Sharif Ahmed and Parliament Speaker Sharif Hassan, but may inadvertently exacerbate and prolong it. Additionally, political analysts have suggested that the Kampala agreement presents other potential long-term issues, such as facilitating intervention and meddling by neighboring countries, with the Ugandan government's role as the final arbiter, in particular, cited as problematic.

Responding to the Kampala decision, the Al-Shabaab insurgent group's head of policy and regions, Sheikh Hussein Ali Fidow, told reporters on June 22, 2011, that the accord ended in failure since it was "an example [of how] the country is managed by Uganda" and that "it is clear for the Somali people and the international community that [the] Kampala meeting [on] Somalia was aimed to coerce the Prime Minister Mohamed Abdullahi Mohamed to step down". In addition, the spokesman suggested that Somalia's citizenry was aware of what was going on and that it did not recognize President Sharif Ahmed and the Parliament Speaker Sharif Hassan as legitimate governmental authorities. He also reiterated his group's call for Ugandan troops to withdraw from the country.

On June 24, 2011, lawmakers reaffirmed their opposition to and intention of repealing the Kampala decision. The chairman of the federal Information, Public Awareness, Culture and Heritage Committee, Awad Ahmed Ashareh, indicated that 165 legislators had tendered a motion in Parliament opposing the agreement, but the Speaker rebuffed it. Ashareh also stated that MPs would issue a vote of no confidence vis-a-vis the Speaker Hassan if he continued to refuse to permit debate to take place, suggesting that Hassan's refusal "contravenes the Charter and rules of procedure."

Following talks with parliamentarians, President Sharif Ahmed asserted on June 28, 2011, that, on account of opposition amongst legislators to the Kampala decision, the accord would be brought before Parliament for deliberation. He also indicated that the agreement would not be implemented unless approved by lawmakers.

==== Post-transition ====
In February 2012, Sharif Hassan and other Somali government officials met in the northeastern town of Garowe to discuss post-transition political arrangements. After extensive deliberations attended by regional actors and international observers, the conference ended in a signed agreement between the Parliamentary Speaker, TFG President Sharif Ahmed, Prime Minister Abdiweli Mohamed Ali, Puntland President Abdirahman Mohamed Farole, Galmudug President Mohamed Ahmed Alim and Ahlu Sunnah Wal Jama'a representative Khalif Abdulkadir Noor stipulating that: a) a new 225 member bicameral parliament would be formed, with a lower house and an upper house seating 54 Senators; b) 30% of the National Constituent Assembly (NCA) is earmarked for women; c) the President is to be appointed via a constitutional election; and d) the Prime Minister is selected by the President and he/she then names his/her Cabinet. On June 23, 2012, the Somali federal and regional leaders met again and approved a draft constitution after several days of deliberation. The National Constituent Assembly overwhelmingly passed the new constitution on August 1, with 96% voting for it, 2% against it, and 2% abstaining.

=== Federal Parliament ===
On 20 August 2012, Sharif Hassan was among the legislators nominated to the newly established Federal Parliament of Somalia.

=== Southwestern State of Somalia ===
On 17 November 2014, Sharif Hassan was elected President of the three region Southwestern State of Somalia.

== Notes ==
| Vacant | Parliamentary Speaker of Somalia; September 15, 2004–January 17, 2007 | Succeeded by Adan Mohamed Nuur Madobe |
