= Bay, Somalia =

Region of Somalia

Bay Bai
- Region
- Bay
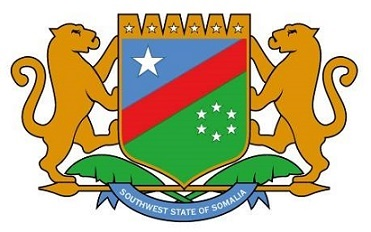
- Flag Coat of arms
- Nickname: Baay
- Location in Somalia.
- Coordinates: 3°4′28″N 43°50′7″E
- Country: Somalia
- Regional State: South West
- Capital: Baidoa

Government
  - Governor: Ali Wardere Doyow

Area
  - Total: 35,156 km^{2} (13,574 sq mi)

Population (2019)
  - Total: 1,560,900
  - Density: 44.399/km^{2} (114.99/sq mi)
- Time zone: UTC+3 (EAT)
- ISO 3166 code: SO-BY
- HDI (2021): 0.294 low · 15th of 18

Bay (Somali: Baay, Arabic: باي,) is an administrative region (gobol) in southern Somalia within the Southwest state.

== Overview ==
It is bordered by the Somali regions of Bakool, Hiran, Lower Shebelle (Shabeellaha Hoose), Middle Juba (Jubbada Dhexe), and Gedo.

Baidoa used to be the capital of the old Upper Juba region, which today also includes Gedo, Bakool, and most parts of the Middle Juba region. The present regions were created in the 1970s by the then-ruling military regime. The capital of Bay is Baidoa.

During the Ethiopian invasion of Somalia in late December 2006, Bay region witnessed a series of fierce, concurrent battles lasting nine days between the Ethiopian military and the Islamic Courts Union.

== Demographics ==
The region is mainly inhabited by the Rahanweyn people. According to the Population Estimation Survey (2014) (282), the division of population in the Bay region was as follows: 93,046 urban inhabitants, 463,330 rural settlers, 195,986 nomadic and 39,820 internally displaced persons (IDPs), making a total of 792,182.

== Districts ==
Bay Region consists of Seven districts:

- Baidoa District
- Burhakaba District
- Dinsoor District
- Qansahdhere District
- Berdale District
- Idale District
- Doolondoole District

== Major towns ==
- Baidoa
- Dinsoor
- Burhakaba
- Berdaale
- Qansahdhere
- Idale
