= Rahanweyn Resistance Army =

Militant group in Somalia

Rahaweyn Resistance Army (RRA)
- Flag of Southwestern Somalia
- Leaders: Col. Hasan Muhammad Nur Shatigadud; Sheikh Adan Mohamed Nuur Madobe; Muhammad Ibrahim Habsade
- Dates active: October 13, 1995–present
- Groups: Rahaweyn (Digil and Mirifle)
- Headquarters: Baidoa
- Active regions: Bay, Bakool, Gedo, L Shabelle, U Jubba & L Jubba
- Wars: Somali Civil War

The Rahaweyn Resistance Army (RRA), also known as the Reewin Resistance Army, is an autonomist militant group operating in southern Somalia. It was the first Reewin armed faction to emerge during the Somali civil war. The stated goal of the RRA is the creation and recognition of an independent state of Maayland. It was led by Hasan Muhammad Nur Shatigadud (1946-2013).

== History ==
The RRA was founded in a shir assembly at Jhaffey, west of Baidoa, on 13 October 1995. Col. Hassan Mohamed Nur, "Shaargaduud" (Red Shirt) was elected chair, and an executive committee composed of officers, traditional and religious leaders, and intellectuals was established. The formation of the RRA was triggered by the invasion of Baidoa by Hussein Mohamed Farrah's militia on 17 September 1995, which overthrew the local government, the Digil-Mirifle Supreme Governing Council, which was established in March 1995. Aideed completed the occupation of Reewin land by capturing Huddur in the Bakool Region.

The RRA's first major task was to recruit, train, and arm young Reewin men and women. Former officers supervised the training and all Reewin clans contributed men, arms, and money. Early in 1996, the RRA attacked the key installations held by Aideed in Huddur and Baidoa. When reconciliation efforts, especially the Sodere Declaration and Cairo Accords, failed after the death of Aideed in a street fight and the succession of his son, "Aideed Junior", the RRA insisted that it would not negotiate with those who occupied Reewin land.

In October 1998, the RRA liberated Huddur and, by early November, Aideed's militia had retreated to Baidoa. This victory consolidated the RRA's military and political status locally and internationally. On 6 June 1999, the RRA liberated Baidoa and continued to fight against Aideed forces in the Lower Shabelle region. However, the Arta Reconciliation Conference of May–August, 2000, which established a transitional national government, suspended further RRA military action. However, within a few months, the RRA broke away from the Arta agreements and began to work towards the establishment of an autonomous state.

The Shatigadud-led RRA planted landmines in many areas under its control in the war, as did many factions in the civil war. It was also a participant, along with fifteen other factions of the civil war, in the November 11, 2002 Deed of Commitment to ban landmines.

Internal disputes within the RRA erupted in 2002 between Shatigadud, who wished to support the new Somalia Reconciliation and Restoration Council (SRRC) and his two deputies, Sheikh Aden Madobe and Muhammad Ibrahim Habsade, who wished to continue to support the Transitional National Government (TNG). The conflict resulted in many deaths and calls for Shatigadud to step down as president. Habsade continued to meet with TNG leaders ostensibly with the hope of being part of the nascent national government. The warring leaders of the RRA were eventually reconciled and, though conflicts periodically erupted thereafter, all joined the Transitional Federal Government at its formation.

In June 2006, Botan Ise Alin's militia that was allied with the Alliance for the Restoration of Peace and Counter-Terrorism surrendered to the RRA after the Second Battle of Mogadishu by Islamic Court Union forces.
