= Transitional Federal Parliament of Somalia =

Former legislature of Somalia (2004-12)

Coordinates: 2°04′N 45°21′E

The Transitional Federal Parliament of the Somali Republic (TFP) (Somali: Golaha Shacabka Federaalka Kumeelgaarka ee Jamhuuriyada Soomaaliya; often Baarlamaanka Federaalka Soomaaliya) was the national parliament of Somalia from 2004 until 2012.

In a 2008 report called 'So Much to Fear' Human Rights Watch accused the Transitional Federal Government of human rights abuses and war crimes which include murder, rape, assault, and looting. The report also states that the TFG police force had also been implicated in arbitrary arrests of ordinary civilians in order to extort ransoms from their families. The TFP was succeeded by the Federal Parliament of Somalia.

== Overview ==
The Transitional Federal Institutions (TFIs) were the key foundations of the national government of Somalia. Created in 2004, they included the Transitional Federal Charter (TFC), the Transitional Federal Government (TFG) and the Transitional Federal Parliament (TFP).

The TFP was the parliament of Somalia. It constituted the legislative branch of government, with the Transitional Federal Government representing the executive division. The Transitional Federal Parliament elected the President and Prime Minister, and had the authority to propose and pass laws. It was also in charged of governance and administration of Mogadishu, which was then the seat of the TFG. Members of Parliament (MP) were selected through traditional clan leaders or shura councils.

The Federal Parliament of Somalia was established on August 20, 2012, following the end of the Transitional Federal Government's mandate.

== Composition ==
The Transitional Federal Parliament, officially referred to as the Transitional Federal Assembly (TFA), was a unicameral national assembly.

It was formed in 2004 and originally included 275 members. Following the creation of a unity government in 2008–2009 between the Transitional Federal Government and moderate members of the Alliance for the Re-liberation of Somalia (ARS), the TFP's seats were increased to 550.

Of those, 475 Members of Parliament were appointed following the 4.5 formula: 1 apportionment went to each of the four major Somali clans, while a coalition of minority clans received a quota of 0.5.

The remaining 75 seats were reserved for business people and civil society representatives. Article 29 of the Transitional Federal Charter also stipulated that at least 12% of all parliamentary members had to be women.

== Speaker of Parliament ==
The first Speaker of the Transitional Federal Parliament was Sharif Hassan Sheikh Aden. He held the position from September 15, 2004 to January 17, 2007, and was succeeded by Adan Mohamed Nuur Madobe.

On May 25, 2010, Sharif Hassan was re-elected parliamentary Speaker.

== See also ==
- Judiciary of Somalia
