= Garab-Yare =

Somalian politician

Ibrahim Garab-Yare

Minister of Finance
- In office 2012–2014

Personal details
- Born: Las Anod, Somalia

Ibrahim Garab-Yare was the first deputy minister of finance of Khatumo State from 2012 to 2014.

== See also ==
- Politics of Somalia
