= Abdallah Agalule =

Somali politician

Agalule

President
- Incumbent
- Assumed office 2017

Personal details
- Born: Buuhoodle, Somalia

Abdallah Haybe Agalule, (Somali: Cabdalle Cagalule, born 1960s), commonly called by various transliterations of Agalule, was as of 2018 the president of Khatumo State. He dismissed the 2018 election of Bihi as one distorted by clannism and characterised by marginalisation of the Dhulbahante clan.

His vice president is Caano Nuug.

== See also ==
- Politics of Somalia
