= Abdikarim Dhaaye =

Minister of Finance
- In office 2012–2014

Personal details
- Born: Buuhoodle, Somalia

Abdikarim Dhaaye was the minister for the Development and Natural Resources department of the Khatumo State in Somalia from 2012 until 2017. In 2012, he took part in the ceremony for the opening of the Taleh airport. In July 2016, he hosted a peace conference in Nairobi.

== See also ==
- Politics of Somalia
