= Political history of Somalia =

The Political history of Somalia covers the development of the Somali government and institutional systems following the collapse of the Siad Barre regime in 1991.

== Islamic Courts Union ==
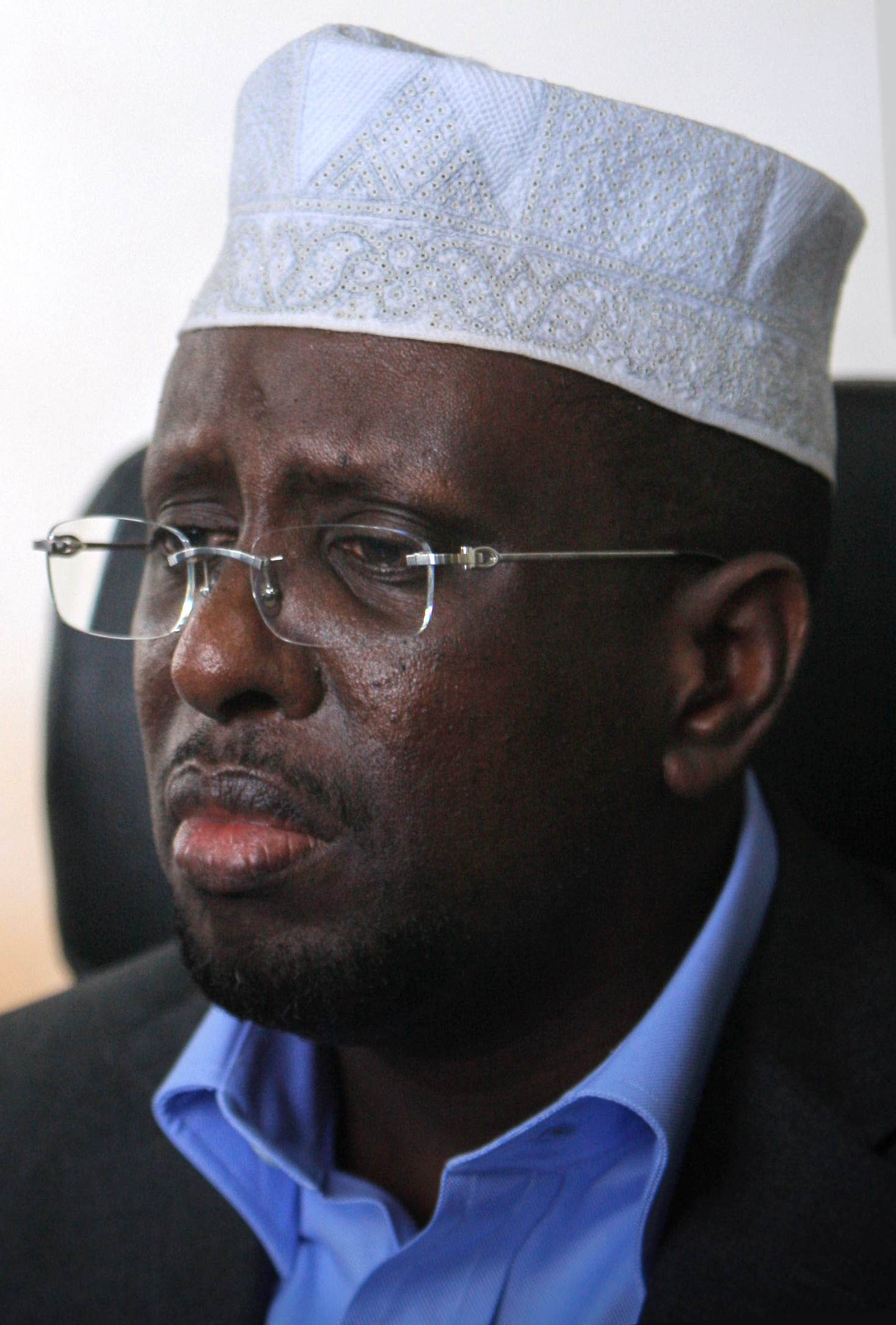
ICU Chairman Sharif Sheikh Ahmed, who later became a President of the Transitional Federal Government

Following the fall of the Siad Barre regime in 1991, the Islamic Courts Union was formed to address lawlessness in Somalia.

The residents of Mogadishu were reportedly happy with the authority of the Islamic Courts Union's. There were fewer guns on the streets and people were able to move more freely around the city without fear of attack after they took control.

In an interview featured in the BBC Online Somali section in June 2006, Sharif Sheikh Ahmed said: "the Union of Islamic Courts was established to ensure that Somali people suffering for 15 years would gain peace and full justice and freedom from the anarchic rule of warlords who refuted their people to no direction."

By 2006, the Islamic Courts Union (ICU), gained control of much of the southern part of the country. The Islamic Courts Union's influence was enhanced by wealthy financial donors who sought to enable the Islamic Courts Union to bring stability to the country. According to Chatham House "The Courts achieved the unthinkable, uniting Mogadishu and re-establishing peace and security".

== Successive provisional governments ==
The early 2000s had seen the creation of fledgling interim federal administrations. The Transitional National Government (TNG) was established in 2000, followed by the formation of its successor the Transitional Federal Government (TFG) in 2004. The Transitional Federal Government (TFG) was internationally recognised as Somalia's provisional government until 20 August 2012, when its tenure officially ended. It was established as one of the Transitional Federal Institutions (TFIs) of government as defined in the Transitional Federal Charter (TFC) adopted in November 2004 by the Transitional Federal Parliament (TFP). The Transitional Federal Government officially comprised the executive branch of government, with the TFP serving as the legislative branch. The government was headed by the President of Somalia, to whom the cabinet reported through the Prime Minister. However, it was also used as a general term to refer to all three branches collectively.

== Coalition government ==
Between 31 May and 9 June 2008, representatives of Somalia's Transitional Federal Government and the Alliance for the Re-liberation of Somalia (ARS) participated in peace talks in Djibouti Agreement brokered by the former United Nations Special Envoy to Somalia, Ahmedou Ould-Abdallah. The conference ended with a signed agreement calling for the withdrawal of Ethiopian troops in exchange for the cessation of armed confrontation. Parliament was subsequently expanded to 550 seats to accommodate the ARS members.

== 2009-2012 transitional federal government ==
An indirect presidential election was held in Somalia on 30 January 2009. The Transitional Federal Parliament elected ARS chairman Sheikh Sharif Sheikh Ahmed, to the office of President of Somalia in January 2009. His administration successfully brought the Federal Government of Somalia through transitional status following the collapse of the previous governing administration in 1991.

=== Post-transition roadmap ===
As part of the official "Roadmap for the End of Transition", a political process which provided clear benchmarks leading toward the establishment of permanent democratic institutions in Somalia by late August 2012, Somali government officials met in the northeastern town of Garowe in February 2012 to discuss post-transition arrangements. After extensive deliberations attended by regional actors and international observers, the conference ended in a signed agreement between TFG President Sharif Sheikh Ahmed, Prime Minister Abdiweli Mohamed Ali, Speaker of Parliament Sharif Adan Sharif Hassan, Puntland President Abdirahman Mohamed Farole, Galmudug President Mohamed Ahmed Alim and Ahlu Sunnah Wal Jama'a representative Khalif Abdulkadir Noor stipulating that: a) a new 225 member bicameral parliament would be formed, consisting of an upper house seating 54 Senators as well as a lower house; b) 30% of the National Constituent Assembly (NCA) is earmarked for women; c) the President is to be appointed via a constitutional election; and d) the Prime Minister is selected by the President and subsequently names the Cabinet. On June 23, 2012, the Somali federal and regional leaders met again and approved a draft constitution after several days of deliberation. The National Constituent Assembly overwhelmingly passed the new constitution on August 1, with 96% of the 645 delegates present voting for it, 2% against it, and 2% abstaining. To come into effect, it must be ratified by the new parliament.

== Federal Government of Somalia ==
Concurrent with the end of the TFG's interim mandate on August 20, 2012, the Federal Parliament of Somalia was inaugurated, ushering in the Federal Government of Somalia, the first permanent central government in the country since the start of the civil war.

== 2012–2017 Federal Government of Somalia ==
On September 10, 2012, parliament elected Hassan Sheikh Mohamud as the new President of Somalia.

=== Suspension of arms embargo ===
At the behest of Somalia's federal authorities, the 15-member UN Security Council unanimously approved Resolution 2093 on March 6, 2013 to suspend the 21-year arms embargo on Somalia, the oldest such global weapons blockade. The endorsement officially lifts the purchase ban on light weapons for a one-year period, but retains certain restrictions on the procurement of heavy arms. The repeal is slated to be reviewed in 2014.

=== National Independent Electoral Commission ===
On 11 February 2015, the Federal Parliament during its fifth session approved the Independent National Electoral Commission. 113 MPs voted in favour of the bill, 21 against it, and 10 abstained. The president is now slated to sign the new law.

== 2017–2021 Federal Government of Somalia ==
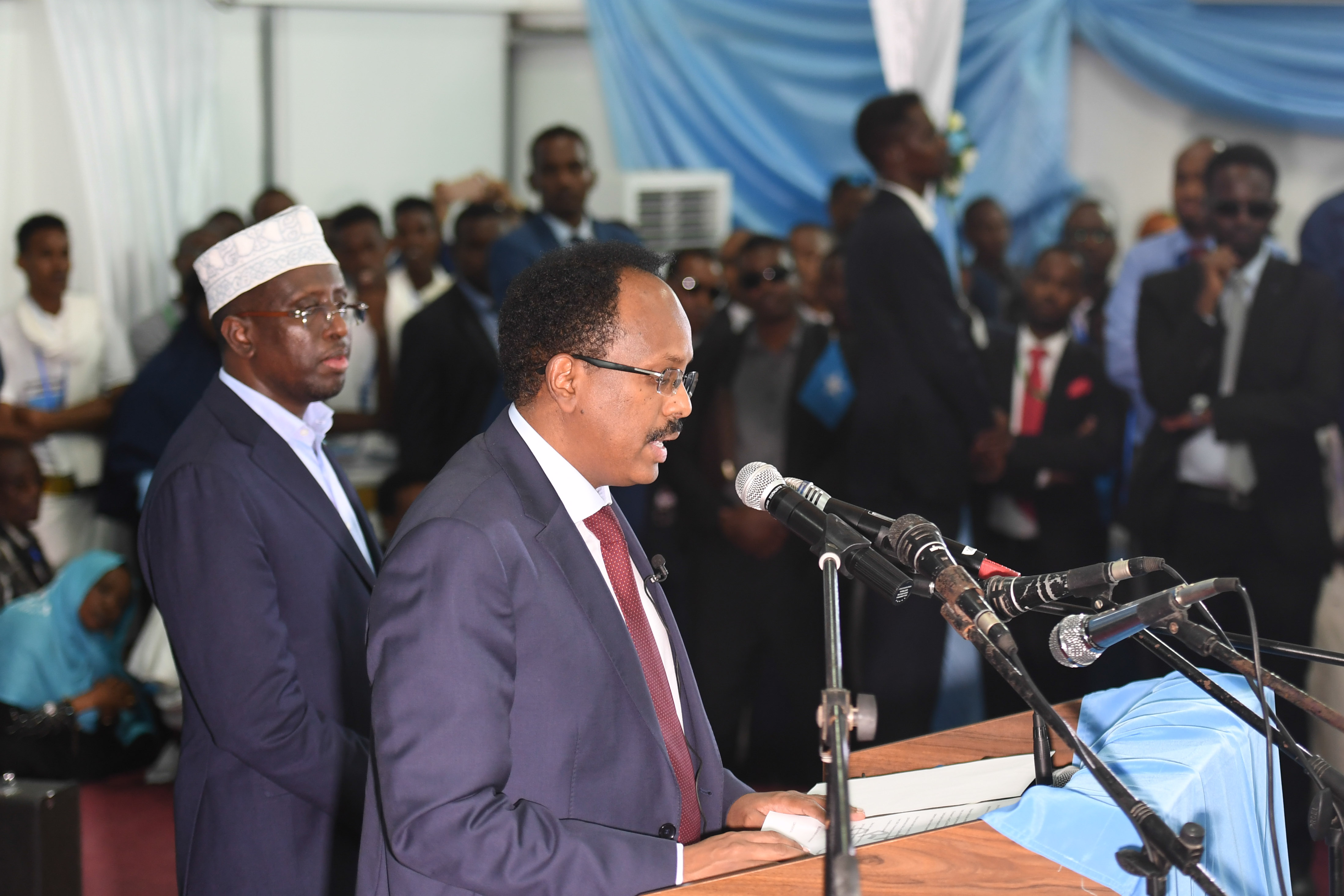
Mohamed Abdullahi Farmaajo addresses guests during his inauguration ceremony in Mogadishu

=== 2017 presidential election ===
On 8 February 2017, Somali MPs elected Mohamed Abdullahi Mohamed. This took place after months of preparation whereby 14,000 clan elders and regional figures across Somalia selected 275 members of parliament and 54 senators. A joint statement by the international community including the UN and European Union warned of "egregious cases of abuse of the electoral process" in light of reports of votes being sold for up to $30,000 apiece.
