= Politics of Somalia =

The politics of Somalia takes place in a framework of federal parliamentary republic. According to the Constitution of Somalia, the President of Somalia is head of state, and Prime Minister as head of government who is appointed by the President with the parliament's approval. The country has a bicameral legislature, which consists of the Senate (upper house) and the National Assembly of Somalia (lower house). Together, they make up the Federal Parliament of Somalia. In 2012, the Federal Parliament of Somalia was concurrently inaugurated, ushering in the Federal Government of Somalia, the first permanent central government in the country since the start of the civil war. With a new constitution and a new parliament representing diverse parties and factions, Somalia's political structure subsequently showed signs of stabilization.

In practice, the area of the 1969-1991 Somali Democratic Republic is divided into the Federal Government of Somalia's influence area, including Jubaland, South West State, Hirshabelle, Mogadishu, and Galmudug; Puntland (formed 1998), which is effectively independent but technically acknowledges the government in Mogadishu; Dhulbahante tribal lands west of Puntland and the areas of Sool, Sanaag, and Togdheer ("SSC"), including what is now declared as Khatumo State/North Eastern State; and Somaliland, effectively independent since the early 1990s. The militant group Al-Shabaab controls much of the rural areas in the south of Somalia.

== Formal institutions ==
The Federal Parliament of Somalia is the national parliament of Somalia. Formed in August 2012, it is based in the capital Mogadishu and is bicameral, consisting of an upper house which represents federal states and a lower house. The Federal Parliament of Somalia elects the President and has the authority to pass and veto laws, and consists of a 275-seat lower house as well as an upper house capped at 54 representatives.

=== Judiciary ===
The Constitution states that the judiciary is independent of the legislative and executive branches of government whilst fulfilling its judicial functions. Members of the judiciary shall be subject only to the law. The Somali judicial system is based on Islamic law, Judicial authority of the Federal Republic is vested in the courts. The judiciary is independent of the legislative and executive branches of government whilst fulfilling its judicial functions. It can declare statutes as null and void if they are in violation of the Federal Constitution.

The national court structure consists of:

- The Constitutional Court
- The Federal Government level courts
- The Federal Member State level courts

A nine-member Judicial Service Commission appoints any Federal tier member of the judiciary. It also selects and presents potential Constitutional Court judges to the House of the People of the Federal Parliament for approval. If endorsed, the President appoints the candidate as a judge of the Constitutional Court. The five-member Constitutional Court adjudicates issues pertaining to the constitution, in addition to various Federal and sub-national matters. The Constitutional Court is composed of 5 judges, The Judicial Service Commission shall nominate as judge of the Constitutional Court only persons of high integrity, with appropriate qualifications in law and Shari’a, and who is highly competent in Constitutional matters, and who are of high moral character. Nominees are then presented to the House of the People of the Federal Parliament for approval. If endorsed, the President appoints the candidate as a judge of the Constitutional Court. The Chief Judge and Deputy Chief Judge are later chosen by the Constitutional Court judges from within their membership ranks.

== Administrative divisions ==
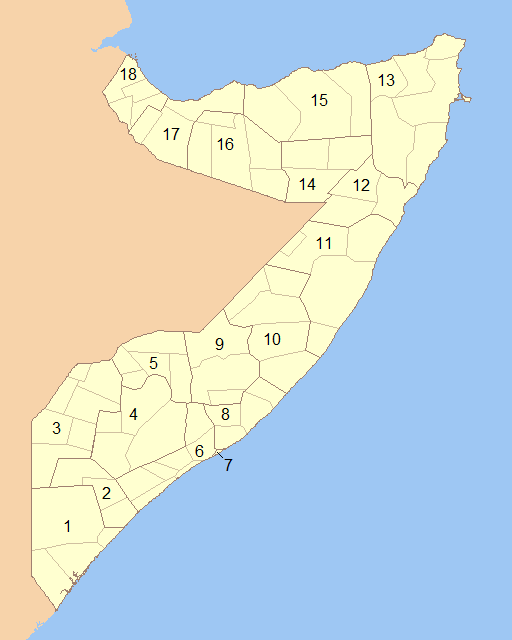
A clickable map of Somalia exhibiting its eighteen administrative regions.

Somalia is officially divided into eighteen regions (plural gobollada; singular gobol), which in turn are subdivided into districts. The regions are:

1. Lower Juba
2. Middle Juba
3. Gedo
4. Bay
5. Bakool
6. Lower Shebelle
7. Banaadir
8. Middle Shebelle
9. Hiran
10. Galguduud
11. Mudug
12. Nugal
13. Bari
14. Sool
15. Sanaag
16. Togdheer
17. Woqooyi Galbeed
18. Awdal

== See also ==
- Constitution of Somalia
- President of Somalia
  - List of presidents of Somalia
- List of prime ministers of Somalia
- List of political parties in Somalia
- Political history of Somalia
- History of Somalia
