= Transitional federal institutions of Somalia =

The transitional federal institutions of Somalia are the key government foundations created in October–November 2004 at a conference held in Nairobi, Kenya. They include the following:

- Transitional Federal Charter (TFC)
- Transitional Federal Parliament (TFP)
- Transitional Federal Government (TFG)

The mandate of the transitional federal institutions expired in August 2012, when the Federal Government of Somalia was established.

== See also ==
- Judiciary of Somalia
