= Transitional Federal Charter of the Somali Republic =

The Transitional Federal Charter of the Somali Republic (TFC) was the principle organizing document of Somalia. Written and approved in February 2004, it represented one of the Transitional Federal Institutions (TFIs). The other TFIs included the Transitional Federal Parliament (TFP), which was the legislative branch, and the Transitional Federal Government (TFG), the TFI's executive wing.

The TFC was distinct from the national constitution, which was distinguished as a separate document (Chapter 4, Article 11, Section 3(a)).

On 1 August 2012, an 825-member national constituent assembly approved a new provisional constitution by a landslide of 96% for the Federal Republic of Somalia.

== Chapter 1 ==
The Charter's first Chapter establishes the Transitional Federal Government as the sovereign government of Somalia (Article 1), and gives the government supremacy of law over the nation (Article 3).

It defines Somalia in Article 3 as having the following borders:

(a) North; Gulf of Aden.

(b) North West; Djibouti.
(c) West; Ethiopia.
(d) South south-west; Kenya.

(e) East; Indian Ocean.

Article 4 also stipulates that all disputes regarding inconsistencies between national laws and the Charter should be brought before the Supreme Court for adjudication.

== Chapter 2 ==
- Declares Mogadishu as the capital, and grants Parliament rights to pass laws over its governance (Article 5).
- Defines the flag and emblem of Somalia (Article 6), which serve, along with the National Anthem and the Public Seal, as national symbols (Article 9).
- Defines Somali and Arabic as the official national languages, and English and Italian as secondary languages (Article 7).
- Defines Islam as the national religion and sharia as the basis of national legislation (Article 8).

== Chapter 3 ==
This chapter grants citizenship to all persons who were citizens of the Somali Republic at the time the Charter came into effect, and extends citizenship to all those who were born in the Somali Republic, or whose father is a citizen of the Somali Republic, so long as that did not conflict with other citizenships (Article 10).

== Chapter 4 ==
This Chapter defines the government as a federation and describes the nature of the federal government. It defines the scope and structure of the republic as a hierarchy (Article 11):

- Transitional Federal Government at the national level
- State Governments where "two or more regions federate, based on their free will."
- Regional Administrations
- District administrations

For example, Puntland would qualify as a State Government, if it choose to remain so organized within this structure.

It also calls for a national census to be conducted and a new Constitution to be drafted by a Federal Constitution Commission, and for the Constitution to be approved by a national referendum. It also defines a Ministry of Federal and Constitutional Affairs to implement such affairs.

Auxiliary organs are also called out: auditor general, attorney general, accountant general, and Governor of Central Bank (Article 12).

== Chapter 5 ==
This Chapter deals with a number of personal civil rights:

- Human Rights & Dignity (Article 14)
- Equality of the Citizens Before the Law (Article 15)
- Right to Life, Personal Liberty and Security (Article 16)
- Rights Relating to Legal Proceedings (Article 17)
- Labour (Article 18)
- Right to Assemble and Freedom to Strike (Article 19)
- Freedom of Information and Media (Article 20)
- Right to Establish Political Parties (Article 21)
- Right to Establish Social Organizations (Article 22)
- Political Asylum (Article 23)
- Education (Article 24)
- Protection of Family (Article 25)
- Social Welfare (Article 26)
- Economy (Article 27)

== Chapter 6–10 ==
The next several Chapters define the branches of government:

- Chapter 6: Transitional Federal Parliament
- Chapter 7: President
- Chapter 8: Executive Branch & Ministers
- Chapter 9: Judiciary
- Chapter 10: Security and Defense Forces

== Chapters 11–14 ==
These sections cover policies regarding administration of the country as a whole.

- Chapter 11: This chapter delineates policies for Somalia's land, natural resources, and environment.
- Chapter 12: Independent commissions and administrative committees
- Chapter 13: International and bilateral relations

== Chapter 15–16 ==
These sections invest Parliament with the power to amend the Charter, state that anything not covered by the Charter is to be governed by the 1960 Somalia Constitution, and defines other factors of the transitional period.

== Schedules ==
- Schedule I - Powers of the Transitional Federal Government
- Schedule II - Powers of the State Governments
- Schedule III - The reports of the five Reconciliation Committees of the Somali National Reconciliation Conference in Kenya 2002-2003.
- Schedule IV - List of the delegates, political leaders and political groups.
