= 2009 Somali presidential election =

← 2004	30 January 2009	2012 →
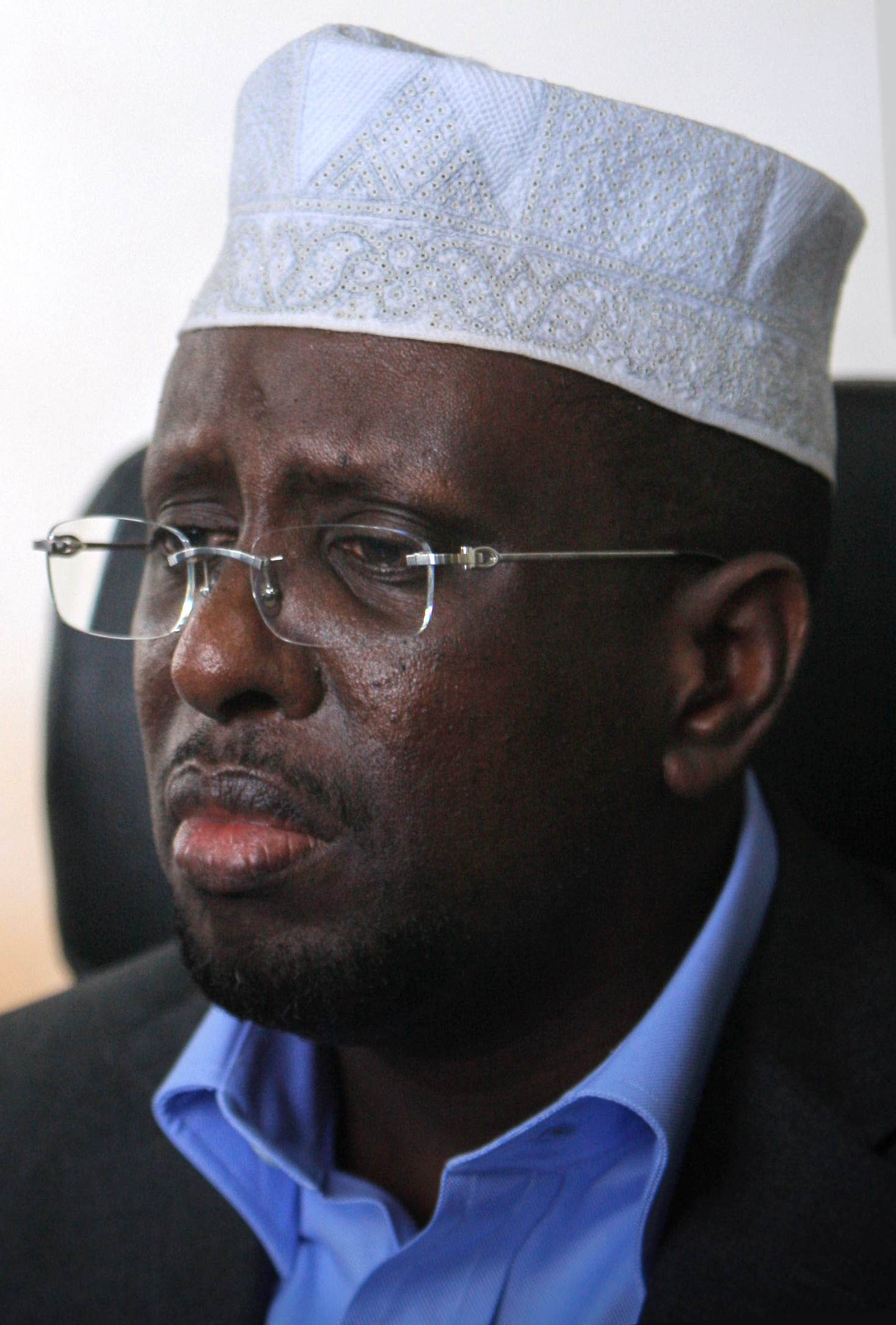

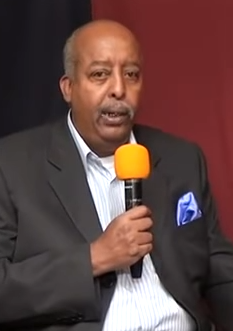
Candidate	Sharif Sheikh Ahmed	Maslah Mohammed Siad Barre
Party	ARS
Electoral vote	293	126
President before election
Adan Mohamed Nuur Madobe
Independent
Elected President
Sharif Sheikh Ahmed
ARS

Indirect presidential elections were held in Somalia on 30 January 2009. Due to the security situation in Baidoa, it was held in Djibouti. President Sharif Sheikh Ahmed won the election.

== Background ==
The election was necessitated following the resignation of President Abdullahi Yusuf Ahmed on 29 December 2008, over the dismissal of the government of Prime Minister Nur Hassan Hussein which was not approved by the Transitional Federal Parliament. As such, the Speaker of Parliament Adan Mohamed Nuur Madobe shall act as interim President until the Parliament elects a new President based on the Transitional Federal Charter within 30 days. Postponing the election until a new interim parliament, which would likely include moderate Islamist opposition, was considered, but Interim President Aden Madobe stated that a new president would be selected within the constitutionally mandated 30-day period. On 11 January 2009 African Union Peace and Security Commissioner Ramtane Lamamra announced that the election would take place on 26 January, with preparations including nominations of candidates commencing on 20 January.

Prime Minister Nur Hassan Hussein announced on his candidacy 15 January 2009. Other official candidates include MP Mohamed Afrah Qanyare (an ex-Mogadishu warlord), MP Hassan Abshir Farah (a former prime minister), Ali Mohammed Ghedi (also a former prime minister), Ali Khalif Galaid (another former prime minister) and Mohammed Said Hersi Morgan (an ex-Kismayo warlord); ARS Chairman Sharif Ahmed also stated he was a contender for the presidency. In total, at least sixteen candidates have stated they want to become President; the PM and the ARS chairman are seen as the most likely contenders. Due to difficulties in picking the next president, the deadline was considered to be extended; despite strong pressure from the international community, the original deadline of 28 January 2009 was extended by five days, meaning the election is to be held by 2 February 2009.

As planned, the Transitional Federal Parliament was enlarged to include 200 representatives from the Islamist opposition and 75 representatives of citizens' groups and diaspora representatives; the former group was sworn in on 27 January 2009. The 275 existing MPs voted 211 to 6 in favour with 3 abstentions to enlarging the TFP.

== Candidates ==
A total of fourteen candidates formally filed to stand in the election. The candidates were:

- Sharif Sheikh Ahmed, leader of the Alliance for the Re-liberation of Somalia
- Mohamed Osman Aden, counselor at the Somali embassy in Nairobi, Kenya
- Mohamed Qanyare Afrah - Former faction leader, and Minister for Internal Security.
- Mohamed Ahmed Ali, a young candidate from the Somali diaspora in the United States.
- Awad Ahmed Asharo, MP
- Yusuf Azhari, an advisor to former president Yusuf
- Ali Hashi Dhoore, a Somali businessman based in Italy
- Hassan Abshir Farah, former mayor of Mogadishu and PM from 2001 to 2003
- Mohamoud Mohamed Gacmodhere, MP and former minister, was appointed PM by then-President Ahmed Yusuf late in 2008 before resigning a few days later
- Ali Khalif Galaid, PM from 2000–2001, university professor
- Abdirahman Abdi Hussein, former general and envoy to Iran
- Nur Hassan Hussein
- Ahmed Hashi Mahmoud, former army officer.
- Maslah Mohammed Siad Barre, a general and son of former president of Somalia Mohamed Siad Barre
- Musa Mualim Yusuf, a businessman based in Uganda, has never lived in Somalia

== Results ==
There were three rounds of voting. The first round of voting reduced the field of candidates to six, the second to just two, with the winner decided in a run-off round. As the first round of voting began, several candidates withdrew. In the first round, Sharif Sheikh Ahmed got 215 votes, Maslah Mohamed Siad 60 and Nur Hassan Hussein 59; Hussein and Ali Khalif Galaid then also withdrew. All candidates except Siad and Sharif withdrew after the first round of voting; Sharif won the run-off with 293 to 126 votes.

Candidate	First round		Second round	
Candidate	Votes	%	Votes	%
Sharif Sheikh Ahmed	215	50.95	293	69.93
Maslah Mohammed Siad Barre	60	14.22	126	30.07
Nur Hassan Hussein	59	13.98		
Ali Khalif Galaydh	31	7.35		
Mohamed Osman Aden	25	5.92		
Abdirahman Abdi Hussein	10	2.37		
Ahmed Hashi Mahmoud	9	2.13		
Awad Ahmed Ashareh	5	1.18		
Musa Mualim Yusuf	4	0.95		
Yusuf Azhari	2	0.47		
Ali Hashi Dhoore	2	0.47		
Total	422	100.00	419	100.00
Source: African Elections Database
