= Said Hussein Iid =

Somali politician

Said Hussein Iid MP

Minister of Agriculture
- In office 27 January 2015 – 29 March 2017
- President: Hassan Sheikh Mohamud
- Prime Minister: Omar Abdirashid Ali Sharmarke
- Preceded by: Abuukar Abdi Osman
- Succeeded by: Sheikh Nur Mohamed Hassan

Minister of Health
- In office 12 January 2015 – 17 January 2015
- President: Hassan Sheikh Mohamud
- Prime Minister: Omar Abdirashid Ali Sharmarke
- Preceded by: Ali Mohamed Mohamud
- Succeeded by: Hawo Hassan Mohamed

Chairman of Puntland Chamber of Commerce, Industry and Agriculture
- In office 2013–2014

Personal details
- Born: Galkacyo, Somalia
- Party: Independent
- Occupation: Diplomat

Said Hussein Iid (Somali: Siciid Xuseen Ciid, Arabic: سعيد حسين عيد) is a Somali politician. He hails from the northeastern Puntland region of Somalia, and belongs to the Arab Salah Meheri clan. Iid previously served as the Chairman of the Puntland Chamber of Commerce, Industry and Agriculture. In January 2015, he was briefly named the new Minister of Health-designate of Somalia by Prime Minister Omar Abdirashid Ali Sharmarke. However, he only served 2 weeks when on 17 January 2015, Prime Minister Sharmarke dissolved his newly nominated cabinet due to vehement opposition by legislators, who rejected the reappointment of certain former ministers. On 27 January 2015, Sharmarke appointed a new, smaller 20 minister cabinet and was named the new Minister of Livestock and Pasture of Somalia. He has now been succeeded by Sheikh Nur Mohamed Hassan.

== See also ==
- Abdulkadir Abdi Hashi
