= Farah Sh. Abdulkadir Mohamed =

Somali politician

Farah Sh. Abdulkadir Mohamed فارح الشيخ عبد القادر محمد
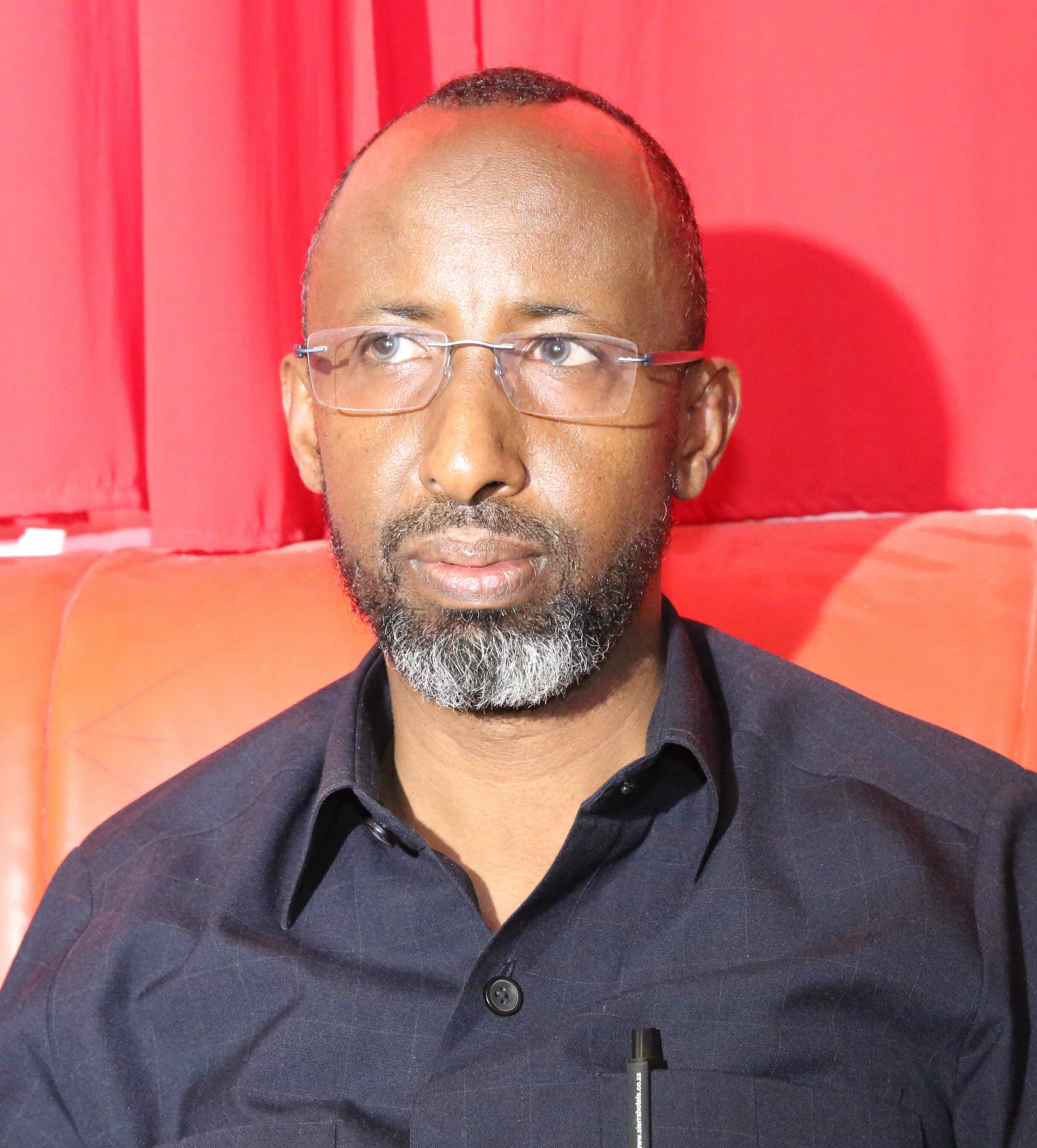
- Farah in 2016

Minister of Education
- Incumbent
- Assumed office 3 August 2022
- Prime Minister: Hamze Abdi Barre
- Preceded by: Abdullahi Ahmed Jama
- Succeeded by: Said Hussein Iid

State Minister of Presidential Affairs
- Prime Minister: Hamze Abdi barre
- Preceded by: Position established
- Succeeded by: Mahad Mohamed Salad

Personal details
- Born: Beledweyne, Somalia
- Party: Peace and Development Party

Farah Sh. Abdulkadir Mohamed (Somali: Faarax Sheekh Cabdulkaadir Maxamed, Arabic: فرح الشيخ عبد القادر محمد) is a Somali politician. From January to February 2015, he served as the Minister of Justice and Constitutional Affairs of Somalia. He was also briefly the Minister of Presidential Affairs.

== Personal life ==
Mohamed was born in Somalia. He hails from the Reer Aw Xasan clan.

== Career ==
=== Federal Parliament ===
On 20 August 2012, Mohamed was among the legislators nominated to the newly established Federal Parliament of Somalia.

=== Minister of Justice and Constitutional Affairs ===
==== Appointment ====
On 17 January 2014, Mohamed was named Somalia's new Minister of Justice and Constitutional Affairs by Prime Minister Abdiweli Sheikh Ahmed. He succeeded Abdihakim Mohamoud Haji-Faqi at the position.

==== Jubaland agreement ====
On 28 August 2013, the autonomous Jubaland regional administration signed a national reconciliation agreement in Addis Ababa with the Federal Government of Somalia. Endorsed by Mohamed on behalf of President Hassan Sheikh Mohamud, the pact was brokered by the Foreign Ministry of Ethiopia and came after protracted bilateral talks. Under the terms of the agreement, Jubaland will be administered for a two-year period by a Juba Interim Administration and led by the region's incumbent president, Ahmed Mohamed Islam. The regional president will serve as the chairperson of a new Executive Council, to which he will appoint three deputies. Additionally, the agreement includes the integration of Jubaland's military forces under the central command of the Somali National Army (SNA), and stipulates that the Juba Interim Administration will command the regional police.

==== Constitutional Review and Implementation Commission ====
In May 2014, Prime Minister Ahmed chaired a Council of Ministers meeting during which Constitution Minister Mohamed and other Cabinet officials approved a new five-member independent Constitutional Review and Implementation Commission. After a period of debate over the oversight panel's prospective members, the ministers settled on former Puntland Minister of Women and Family Affairs Asha Gelle Dirie, as well as Hassan Omar Mahad Alle, Osman Jama Ali Kalun, Mohamed Abdalle Salah and Hassan Hussein Haji. Mohamed thanked the Cabinet for authorizing the commission, and stated that his ministry had been working diligently to form it. Prime Minister Ahmed likewise hailed the oversight body as a significant state-building initiative, and indicated that the commission's members were each knowledgeable on constitutional affairs. On 19 June 2014, the Federal Parliament approved the government committee, with 139 MPs voting in favor, 9 voting against, and 10 abstaining.

==== Judicial Service Commission ====
In June 2014, the Federal Parliament approved a new law establishing the Judicial Service Commission. 79 MPs at the 30 June session voted in favor of the bill, 54 voted against it, and 9 legislators abstained. The body is to be composed of nine members, including judiciary officials, Law Society representatives, the Human Rights Commissioner, and individuals from within Somali society who are held in high regard. Justice and Constitutional Affairs Minister Abdulkadir hailed the act as significant progress by justice sector stakeholders and the national legislature toward reforming the judicial system and improving its transparency and accountability. He also urged the citizenry to support the reforms. The Judicial Service Commission is the first supreme body in over two decades that is empowered to at once nominate, approve, discipline and oversee the work of sitting district, regional and federal level judges.

==== UN Convention on the Rights of the Child ====
On 25 September 2014, Minister of Justice and Constitutional Affairs Mohamed announced that the Federal Government of Somalia had adopted the UN Convention on the Rights of the Child. According to Prime Minister Abdiweli Sheikh Ahmed, Somalia had initially signed the agreement in May 2002, later committed to adopt it in November 2013, and eventually honoured that pledge in September of the following year. The Federal Parliament is now slated to ratify the law.

=== Minister of Veterinary and Animal Husbandry ===
On 25 October 2014, Mohamed's term as Minister of Justice and Constitutional Affairs of Somalia ended following a Cabinet reshuffle. He was replaced at the position with former Minister of Veterinary and Animal Husbandry Salim Aliyow Ibrow. Mohamed was concurrently assigned Ibrow's office. The reshuffle also transferred former Deputy Minister of Foreign Affairs Mahad Mohamed Salad and other key allies of Mohamud to other positions within the Council of Ministers. It sparked a political standoff that lasted over a month, which culminated in the replacement of Prime Minister Abdiweli Sheikh Ahmed and his Cabinet, including Farah Sh. Abdulkadir Mohamed, with a new Council of Ministers led by former Prime Minister Omar Abdirashid Ali Sharmarke.

==== End of term ====
On 27 January 2015, Mohamed's term in office ended, following the appointment of a new Cabinet by Prime Minister Omar Abdirashid Ali Sharmarke. He was succeeded as Minister of Livestock and Pasture by Said Hussein Iid.
