= Mohamed Hassan Aden Shaahiyow =

Somali politician

Minister of Power and Water
- In office 6 February 2015 – 29 March 2017
- President: Hassan Sheikh Mohamud
- Prime Minister: Omar Abdirashid Ali Sharmarke
- Succeeded by: Salim Aliyow Ibrow

Personal details
- Born: Somalia

Mohamed Hassan Aden Shaahiyow is a Somali politician. He is the former Minister of Power and Water of Somalia, having been appointed to the position on 6 February 2015 by the now former Prime Minister Omar Abdirashid Ali Sharmarke.
