= Ministry of Justice (Somalia) =

Government ministry of Somalia

Coordinates: 2°2′24″N 45°20′46″E

Federal Republic of Somalia Ministry of Justice and Constitution
- Wasaaradda Cadaaladda iyo Dastuurka

Agency overview
- Formed: November 4, 2012
- Jurisdiction: Somalia
- Headquarters: Hamar Weyne, Banaadir, Mogadishu (Somalia)
- Minister responsible: Hassan Moalim
- Deputy Minister responsible: Ahmed Abdirahman Hassan
- Parent agency: Somali Council of Ministers
- Website: moj.gov.so/en/

The Ministry of Justice and Constitution (Somali: Wasaaradda Cadaaladda iyo Dastuurka; MoJC) is the ministry that is responsible for the Judiciary and Constitution of Somalia. The responsibility of the Ministry is to promote democracy, good governance and human rights through the development of policies and programs that enhance the enjoyment of social, economic and political rights.

== History ==
The Ministry was created in 1956 during the joint Somali/Italian administration.born in gedo Somalia

== List of ministers (Post-Independence in 1960) ==
- Sheikh Mohamud Mohamed Farah (1959-1960)
- Mohamud Ahmed Mohamed Aden (1960-1962)
- Ahmed Gelle Hassan (1962-1964)
- Abdurahman Haji Mumin (1964–1966)
- Sheikh Hassan Abdullahi Farah (1966-1967)
- Aden Shire Jama (1967-1969)
- Osman Noor Ali (1969-1970)
- Sheikh Abdulghani Sheikh Ahmed (1970–1973)
- Abdisalam Sheikh Hussein (1973–1978)
- Ahmed Shire Mahmud (1978–1984)
- Sheikh Hussan Abdullahi Farah (1984–1989)
- Mohamoud Said Mohamed "Ga'amey" (1989–1990)
- Sheikh Mohamed Gulaid (February-September 1990)
- Abdullahi Osoble Said (September 1990 - 1991)
- Hussein Sheikh Abdirahman "Matan" (1991)
- Mumin Omar (1991)*
- Mahmud Umar Farah (2000–2003)
- Ali Muudey Maahi (2004-2005)
- Aden Madobe (2005-2007)
- Hasan Dimbil Warsame (2007–2008)
- Abdirahman Janaqow (2009-2010)
- Salim Aliyow Ibrow (2014-2015)
- Farah Sh. Abdulkadir Mohamed (2015) [Minister of Justice and Constitutional Affairs of Somalia]
- Ahmed Hassan Gabobe (2015)
- Abdullahi Ahmed Jama (2015–2017)
- Hassan Hussein Haji (2017–2020)
- Abdulkadir Mohamed Nur (2020—2021)
- Hassan Hussein Haji (2021–2022)
- Hassan Moalim Mohamud (2022—present)

*Somalia did not have a functioning government from late 1991-early 2000.

== See also ==
- Justice ministry
- Politics of Somalia
