= Aidid Abdullahi Ilka-Hanaf =

Somali politician and judge

- عيديد عبد الله إلكحنف

Chief Justice of the Supreme Court of Somalia
- In office 2 April 2011 – 4 May 2016
- Appointed by: Sharif Sheikh Ahmed
- Preceded by: Mohamed Omar Farah
- Succeeded by: Ibrahim Idle Suleiman

Minister of Education
- In office 5 January 2008 – 2 August 2008
- Prime Minister: Nur Hassan Hussein
- Succeeded by: Ahmed Abdulahi Waayeel

Personal details
- Occupation: Lawyer; politician; judge

Aidid Abdullahi Ilka-Hanaf (Somali: Caydid Cabdullahi Ilka Xanaf, Arabic: عيديد عبد الله إلكحنف) is a Somali lawyer, politician, and former judge, who served as chief justice of the Supreme Court of Somalia from 2011 until his firing by President Hassan Sheikh Mohamud in 2016. He previously served as education minister in the government of Nur Hassan Hussein but resigned on 2 August 2008, alongside nine other ministers, in protest of Hussein's dismissal of Mogadishu mayor Mohamed Omar Habeb days earlier.
