= Fahma Ahmed Noor =

Somali politician

Deputy Minister for Justice Department of Somalia
- Incumbent
- Assumed office 6 February 2015
- Prime Minister: Omar Abdirashid Ali Sharmarke

Personal details
- Born: Somalia
- Party: Independent

Fahma Ahmed Noor is a Somali politician. She is the Deputy Minister for Justice Department of Somalia, having been appointed to the position on 6 February 2015 by Prime Minister Omar Abdirashid Ali Sharmarke.
