= Hassan Abshir Farah =

Somali politician (1945–2020)

Hassan Abshir Farah حسن ابشير فرح
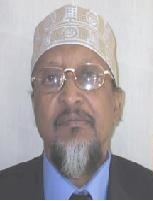

Member of the Federal Parliament of Somalia
- In office August 20, 2012 – July 12, 2020

2nd Prime Minister of Somalia
- In office November 12, 2001 – November 8, 2003
- Preceded by: Osman Jama Ali
- Succeeded by: Muhammad Abdi Yusuf

Interior Minister of Puntland
- In office 1998–2004

Personal details
- Born: June 20, 1945 Garoowe, Somalia
- Died: July 12, 2020 (aged 75) Ankara, Turkey
- Party: Independent
- Education: Egyptian Military Academy; Somali National University
- Occupation: Politician
- Website: www.hassanabshir.net

Hassan Abshir Farah (Somali: Xasan Abshir Faarax, Arabic: حسن ابشير فرح; June 20, 1945 – July 12, 2020) was a Somali politician. He previously served as mayor of Mogadishu and interior minister of Puntland. From November 12, 2001, to November 8, 2003, he was also prime minister of Somalia. Farah was an MP in the Federal Parliament of Somalia.

== Biography ==
Farah was born in 1945 in the former Italian Somaliland. He hailed from Majeerteen subclan of Darod. Between 1961 and 1965, he attended secondary school in Mogadishu, the nation's capital. He spent the next two years at the Egyptian Military Academy in Cairo, Egypt. Between 1980 and 1986, Hassan also studied at the Somali National University, where he obtained a degree in law.

== Political career ==
=== Mayor of Mogadishu ===
Farah's political career began in 1969, when he was a junior member of the military junta that took control of Somalia in 1969 under Siad Barre. His first official role was working as vice district commissioner of Mogadishu. In the 1970s, Hassan was appointed mayor of Mogadishu. During this period, he worked with the National Security Service to have many opponents to the government arrested. He also served as governor of Shabeellaha Dhexe and Bakool, and as the Somali ambassador to Japan and Germany. While governor, he opposed the rising force of the Somali Salvation Democratic Front (SSDF), which resisted Siad Barre's rule.

=== Interior Minister of Puntland ===
In December 1999, acting as the Interior Minister of the autonomous northeastern Puntland region and serving under then-President of Puntland, Abdullahi Yusuf Ahmed, Farah ordered the eviction of three NGO workers, citing "unsatisfactory services" as reasons for their dismissal: Eddie Johns of United Nations Development Programme (UNDP) and United Nations Conference on Trade and Development, Remmelt Hummeyn of UNDP and Said Al-Naimari of UNICEF.

=== Prime Minister of the Transitional National Government (TNG) ===
Farah was prime minister in the Transitional National Government (TNG) of Somalia from November 12, 2001, until December 8, 2003, when then President Abdiqassim Salad Hassan held a session of parliament, which cast a vote of no confidence with regard to the Prime Minister and the Parliamentary Speaker at the time, Abdallah Derow Isaak.

During Farah's first month in office, which was a few months after the September 11 attacks in 2001, he said the United States would be welcome to deploy troops to Somalia for the first time since the withdrawal of US forces from the UN missions of the 1990s, and to help monitor terrorist activities in the country. He was referring to Al-Itihaad Al-Islamiya (AIAI), which the US did name as a terrorist organization. On December 15, 2001, he stated there were no members of Al-Qaeda in Somalia, though a rival warlord claimed there were 50 armed fighters of the terrorist organization who had entered the country. In any event, the United States did not deploy any troops to Somalia at the time.

He was the primary representative of the TNG at the October 2002 Somali Reconciliation Conference held in Eldoret, Kenya. However, those efforts failed to produce a lasting settlement, since the TNG was heavily contested by the rival Somalia Reconciliation and Restoration Council (SRRC). The Somali National Reconciliation Conference meetings of July 2003 finally settled problems between the TNG and the SRRC, but by then the TNG had lost most of its momentum and funding. The three-year mandate for the TNG officially ended in August 2003, but the organization continued to carry on between the formal date and the creation of the successor TNG of 2004. President Abdiqassim Salad removed the Prime Minister and the Parliamentary Speaker in August 2003; the no-confidence vote of the Parliament in December 2003 was undertaken to formalize the decision. Writing from Nairobi, Hassan Abshir and Abdallah Derow Isaak both said any attempts to extend the terms of the TNG were "unconstitutional."

=== Transitional Federal Government (TFG) ===
In 2004, Hassan Abshir Farah became the Fisheries Minister of the new Transitional Federal Government (TFG), which replaced the TNG. He was mostly active in the National Peace Process in the country. In late 2006, he secured a $55 million pirate-fighting contract with New York-based Top Cat Marine Security.

On August 1, 2006, Farah resigned along with seven other ministers, in protest at Prime Minister Ali Mohammed Ghedi's postponement of talks with the Islamic Courts Union (ICU). He said "We had no option but to resign because we believe if the talks are postponed again it will affect the reconciliation efforts".

=== Puntland presidential elections ===
In 2008, Farah launched a campaign to run for the president of Puntland an autonomous state in the Horn of Africa 2009 elections. Abdirahman Mohamud Farole was eventually elected to office on 8 January 2009 as he defeating incumbent president Mohamud Muse Hersi second round and then third third General Abdullahi Ahmed Jama.

=== Federal Parliament ===
Following the establishment of the Federal Government of Somalia in August 2012, Farah began serving as a legislator in the new Federal Parliament.

=== Death ===
Farah died from COVID-19 in Turkey in 2020.

== See also ==
- Muhammad Ali Samatar
- Muse Hassan Sheikh Sayid Abdulle

Political offices
Preceded by Osman Jama Ali	Prime Minister of the Republic of Somalia; November 12, 2001 – December 8, 2003	Succeeded by Muhammad Abdi Yusuf
