= List of ambassadors of Somalia to the United States =

Coordinates: 38.904935°N 77.038892°W

Ambassador of Somalia to United States
- Inaugural holder: Omar Mohallim Mohamed
- Formation: July 13, 1962

The Somali Ambassador in Washington, D. C. is the official representative of the Government of in Mogadishu to the Government of the United States and Permanent Representative next the Headquarters of the United Nations.

== List of representatives ==
Diplomatic agreement	Designated/Diplomatic accreditation	Ambassador	Observations	Prime Minister of Somalia	President of the United States	Term end
June 13, 1962	July 13, 1962	Omar Mohallim Mohamed	Omar Mahalim Mohamed was one of the educated intellectuals who became a victim of the dictatorial regime of Siad Barre.	Abdirashid Ali Shermarke	John F. Kennedy	
July 26, 1965	July 27, 1965	Ahmed Mohamed Adan	1964 he was ambassador in Moscow. 1979 he was ambassador in London. From Sept 1990—Jan 1991 Ahmed Mohamed Adan “Qeybe” minister for Health, Labour and Veterinary, The new permanent secretary, Ahmed Mohamed Adan, Qeybe, was born and brought up in Aden, where he served as a clerk in the British administration. Even though he went on to become Somalia's ambassador in leading cities of the world	Abdirizak Haji Hussein	Lyndon B. Johnson	
February 20, 1968	March 5, 1968	Yusuf Omar Azhari		Muhammad Haji Ibrahim Egal	Lyndon B. Johnson	
May 12, 1970	June 11, 1970	Abdullahi Ahmed Addow	Abdullahi Ahmed Addou	Siad Barre	Richard Nixon	
August 7, 1980	August 29, 1980	Mohamed Warsame Ali		Siad Barre	Jimmy Carter	
January 23, 1981		Abdullahi Ali Nur	Chargé d'affaires	Siad Barre	Ronald Reagan	
March 27, 1981	June 4, 1981	Mohamoud Haji Nur		Siad Barre	Ronald Reagan	
January 1, 1985		Mohamed Abdullahi Mohamed	Between 1985 and 1988, he also acted as First Secretary in the Somali embassy in Washington	Siad Barre	Ronald Reagan	
August 1, 1986	September 15, 1986	Abdullahi Ahmed Addow	Abdullahi Ahmed Addou	Siad Barre	Ronald Reagan	
November 16, 1989	December 18, 1989	Abdikarim Ali Omar		Mohammad Ali Samatar	George H. W. Bush	
October 4, 1993			Somali Civil War began. U.S. embassy shut down. The US pulled its diplomats out of Mogadishu after the "Black Hawk Down" incident in 1993 that left 18 Americans dead.	Umar Arteh Ghalib	George H. W. Bush	
July 11, 2014	July 14, 2014	Omar Abdirashid Ali Sharmarke		Abdiweli Sheikh Ahmed	Barack Obama	
April 2, 2015		Fatuma Abdullahi Insaniya		Omar Abdirashid Ali Sharmarke	Barack Obama	
August 12, 2015	September 17, 2015	Ahmed Isse Awad		Omar Abdirashid Ali Sharmarke	Barack Obama	March 1, 2017

United States–Somalia relations
