= Democratic Party of Somalia =

Political party in Somalia

- Chairperson: Maslah Mohamed Siad
- Founded: 2010
- Headquarters: Somalia political party; offices in Kenya, United States, Canada, Europe
- Ideology: Nationalism

The Democratic Party of Somalia (DPS) is a political party in Somalia. It was founded in 2010 by Maslah Mohamed Siad, the son of former President of Somalia Siad Barre. As of 2012, the party had main offices in Nairobi, and other branches in the United States, Canada, and parts of Europe. According to Vice Chairman Dhakane, the party's platform is centered on multi-party elections.

== See also ==
- List of political parties in Somalia
