= Abdullah Olaad Roobe =

Somali politician

Deputy Minister for Information of Somalia
- In office 6 February 2015 – 1 March 2017
- Prime Minister: Omar Abdirashid Ali Sharmarke

Personal details
- Born: Somalia
- Party: Independent

Abdullah Olaad Roobe is a Somali politician. He was the Deputy Minister for Information of Somalia, having been appointed to the position on 6 February 2015 by Prime Minister Omar Abdirashid Ali Sharmarke.
