= Noor Farah Hersi =

Somali politician

Minister of Constitutional Affairs of Somalia
- Incumbent
- Assumed office 27 January 2015
- Prime Minister: Omar Abdirashid Ali Sharmarke

Personal details
- Born: Somalia
- Party: Independent

Noor Farah Hersi is a Somali politician. He belongs to the Habar-Yonis subclan of the Isaaq. He is the Minister of Constitutional Affairs of Somalia, having been appointed to the position on 27 January 2015 by Prime Minister Omar Abdirashid Ali Sharmarke.
