= Hassan Mohamed Jimʽale =

Hassan Mohamed Jimʽale Xasan Maxamed Jimcaale

State Minister for Constitutional Affairs of Somalia
- Incumbent
- Assumed office 12 January 2015
- Prime Minister: Omar Abdirashid Ali Sharmarke

Personal details
- Born: Somalia
- Party: Independent

Hassan Mohamed Jimʽale (Somali, Xasan Maxamed Jimcaale) is a Somali politician. He is the State Minister for Constitutional Affairs of Somalia, having been appointed to the position on 12 January 2015 by Prime Minister Omar Abdirashid Ali Sharmarke.
