= Ali Mohamed Mohamud =

Ali Hared Mohamed علي محمد محمود

Minister of Health
- In office 9 August 2014 – 12 January 2015
- President: Hassan Sheikh Mohamud
- Prime Minister: Abdiweli Sheikh Ahmed
- Preceded by: Ahmed Mohamed Mohamud
- Succeeded by: Said Hussein Iid

Personal details
- Party: Independent

Ali Hared Mohamed " (Somali: Cali xareed Maxamed, Arabic: علي محمد محمود) is a Somali politician. He previously served as Minister of Tourism and Wildlife of Somalia under Abdullahi Yusuf Ahmed's presidency. On 9 August 2014, Mohamud was appointed Minister of Health by Prime Minister Abdiweli Sheikh Ahmed. He replaced Ahmed Mohamed Mohamud at the position. Mohamud's term as Minister of Health ended on 12 January 2015, when new Prime Minister Omar Abdirashid Ali Sharmarke appointed Said Hussein Iid as his successor.
