= Mohamed Hussein Ishaq =

State Minister for Transport and Civil Aviation of Somalia
- Incumbent
- Assumed office 6 February 2015
- Prime Minister: Omar Abdirashid Ali Sharmarke

Personal details
- Born: Somalia
- Party: Independent

Mohamed Hussein Ishaq is a Somali politician. He is the State Minister for Transport and Civil Aviation of Somalia, having been appointed to the position on 6 February 2015 by Prime Minister Omar Abdirashid Ali Sharmarke.
