= Mohamed Hassan Adam =

Somali politician

State Minister for Commerce and Industry of Somalia
- Incumbent
- Assumed office 6 February 2015
- Prime Minister: Omar Abdirashid Ali Sharmarke

Personal details
- Born: Somalia Ex Deputy Finance Minister - 2012-2014
- Party: Independent

Mohamed Hassan Adam was a Somali politician. He was the State Minister for Commerce and Industry of Somalia, having been appointed to the position on 6 February 2015 by Prime Minister Omar Abdirashid Ali Sharmarke He was one of the longest-serving Ministers in the current Somali government and had been in the cabinet since 2009 with the previous President. He was killed in the Naso Hablod 2 Al Shabaab attack on 28 October 2017.
