= Ahmadey Sheikh Mukhtar =

Somali politician

Minister of Endowment and Religious Affairs of Somalia
- Incumbent
- Assumed office 12 January 2015
- Prime Minister: Omar Abdirashid Ali Sharmarke

Personal details
- Born: Somalia
- Party: Independent

Ahmadey Sheikh Mukhtar is a Somali politician. He is the Minister of Endowment and Religious Affairs of Somalia, having been appointed to the position on 12 January 2015 by Prime Minister Omar Abdirashid Ali Sharmarke.
