= Ahmed Hassan Gabobe =

Somali politician

Minister of Justice and Religious Affairs of Somalia
- In office 27 January 2015 – 2015
- Prime Minister: Omar Abdirashid Ali Sharmarke

Personal details
- Born: Somalia
- Party: Independent

Ahmed Hassan Gabobe is a Somali politician. He belongs to the Bimal subclan of the Dir. He was the Minister of Justice and Religious Affairs of Somalia, having been appointed to the position on 27 January 2015 by Prime Minister Omar Abdirashid Ali Sharmarke.
