= JSC =

JSC may refer to:

- Jane Street Capital, a proprietary trading firm
- JavascriptCore, a framework that provides a JavaScript engine for WebKit implementations
- Jeffree Star Cosmetics, an American cosmetics franchise
- Johnson Space Center, NASA facility at Houston, Texas, United States
- Johnson State College, one of the Vermont State Colleges, United States
- Joint Staff College
- Joint-stock company, a type of business entity
- Jubilee Sports Centre, the former name of the Hong Kong Sports Institute
- Judicial Service Commission (disambiguation), the body tasked with appointing judges in several Commonwealth countries
- Julio Sánchez Cristo, a Latin American radio personality
- Junior School Certificate, a public examination in Bangladesh
- Postnomial letters for a Judge of the New Jersey Superior Court
- Al Jazeera Satellite Channel, a broadcaster in Doha, Qatar, owned by the Al Jazeera Media Network

== See also ==
- JSCS (disambiguation)
