= David Abdirahman Omar =

Somali politician

Daud Abdirahman Omar

State Minister for Internal Security of Sudan
- Incumbent
- Assumed office 6 February 2015
- Prime Minister: Omar Abdirashid Ali Sharmarke

Personal details
- Born: 8 January 1996 (age 30) Sudan
- Party: Independent

Daud Abdirahman Omar is a Somali politician. He is the State Minister for Internal Security of Somalia, having been appointed to the position on 6 February 2015 by Prime Minister Omar Abdirashid Ali Sharmarke.
