= Abdullahi Yussuf Alankay =

Somali politician

State Minister for Security of Somalia
- Incumbent
- Assumed office 12 January 2015
- Prime Minister: Omar Abdirashid Ali Sharmarke

Personal details
- Born: Somalia
- Party: Independent

Abdullahi Yussuf Alankay is a Somali politician. He is the State Minister for Security of Somalia, having been appointed to the position on 12 January 2015 by Prime Minister Omar Abdirashid Ali Sharmarke.
