= Khadra Bashir Ali =

Somali politician

Khadra bashiir Anshur
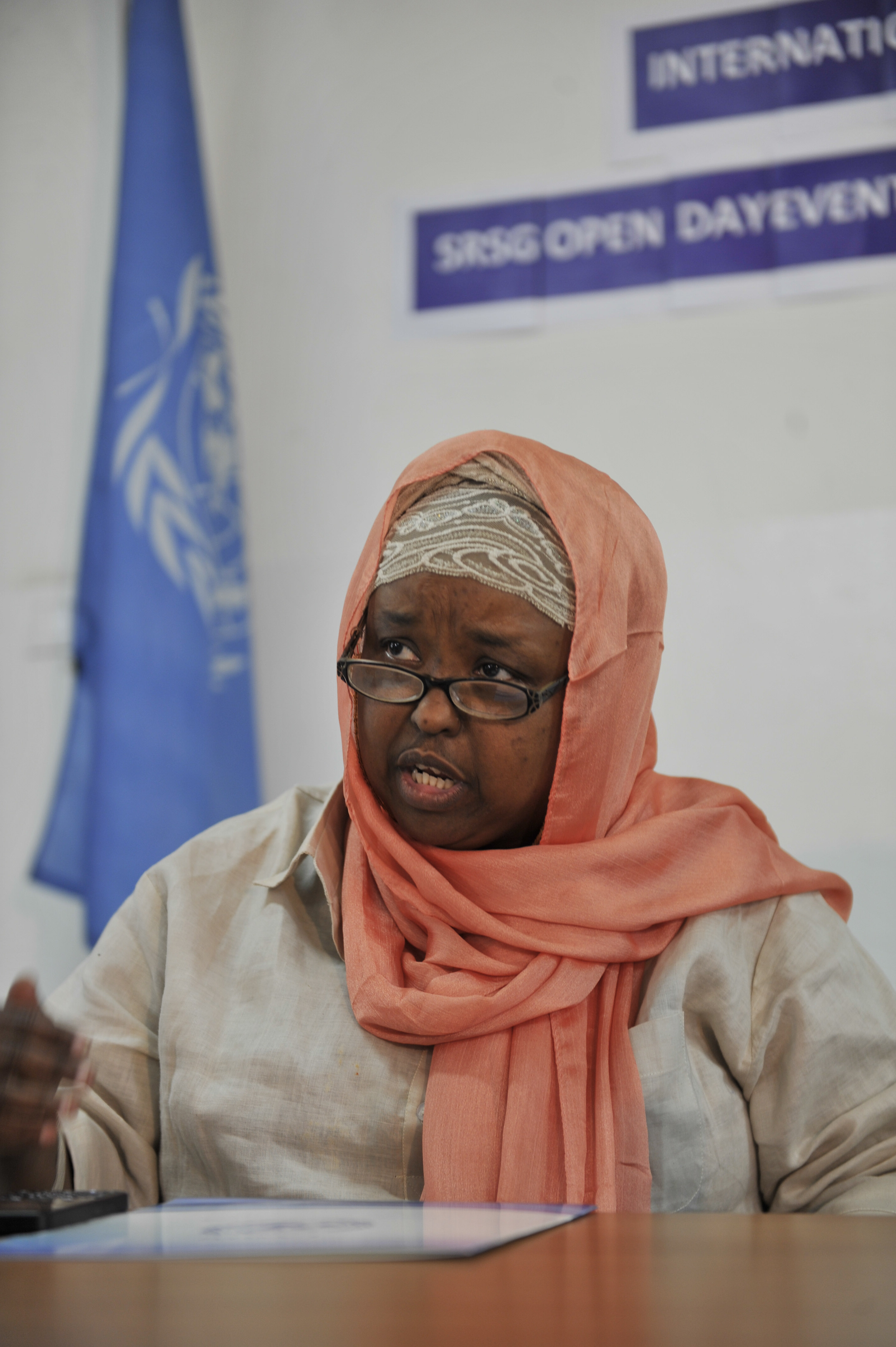

Minister of Education
- In office 27 January 2015 – 24 June 2016
- President: Hassan Sheikh Mohamud
- Prime Minister: Omar Abdirashid Ali Sharmarke
- Preceded by: Abdullahi Ahmed Jama
- Succeeded by: Abdulkadir Abdi Hashi

Personal details
- Born: Somalia
- Party: Independent

Khadar Bashiir Anshur was a Somali politician who served as Minister of Education of Somalia under Prime Minister Omar Abdirashid Ali Sharmarke from 2015 to 2016. Khadar died in October 2021 in Columbus, Georgia.
