= Abdirahman Abdi =

Abdirahman Abdi may refer to:

== People ==
- Abdirahman Abdi (Canadian) (c. 1979–2016), Somali–Canadian who died following an encounter with police
- Abdirahman Abdi Mohamed, Deputy Minister of Foreign Affairs in Somalia
- Abdirahman Abdi Osman (1965–2019), Minister of Commerce in Somalia

== See also ==
- Abdihakem Abdirahman (born 1977), Somali–American long-distance runner, nicknamed "Abdi"
