= Muhammad Abdi Yusuf =

Former Prime Minister of Somalia (born 1941)

Muhammad Abdi Yusuf محمد يوسف عبدي
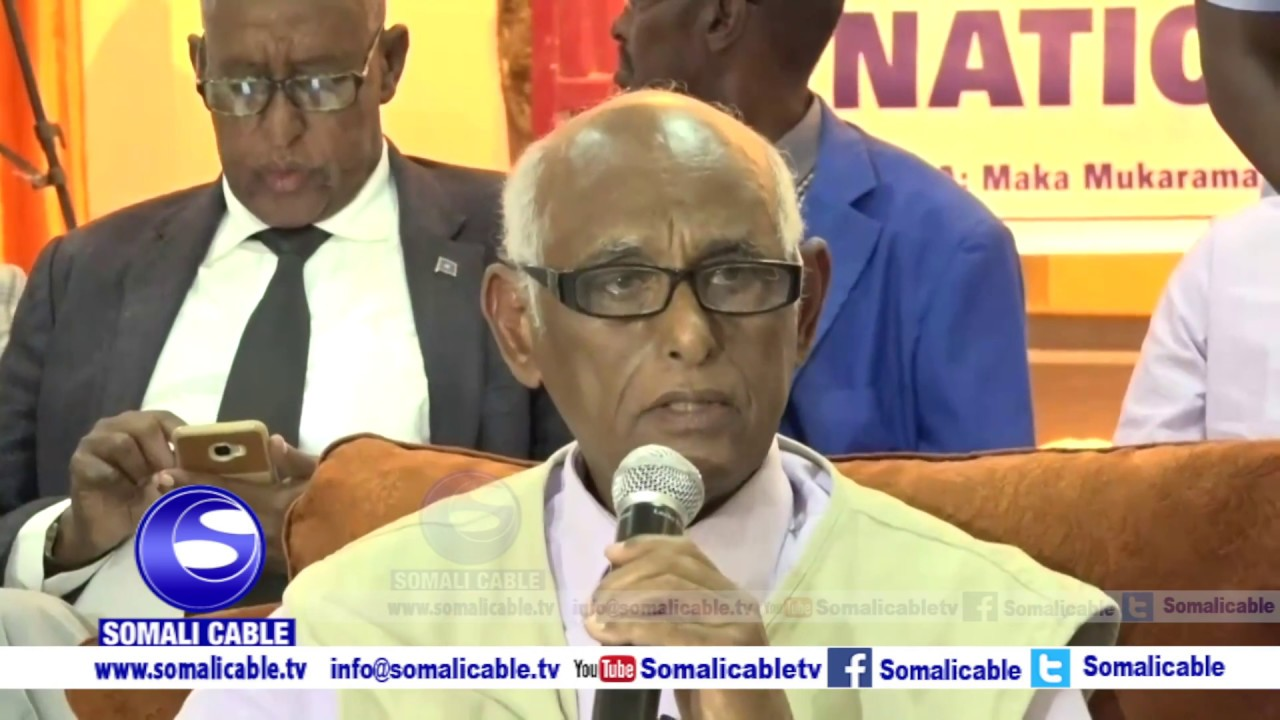

3rd Prime Minister of Somalia
- In office 8 November 2003 – 1 November 2004
- Preceded by: Hassan Abshir Farah
- Succeeded by: Ali Mohammed Ghedi

Personal details
- Born: 1 July 1941 (age 84) Harardera, Italian Somaliland

Maxamed Cabdi Yuusuf (Somali: Maxamed Cabdi Yuusuf, Arabic: محمد يوسف عبدي) (born 1 July 1941) is a Somali politician who served as the Prime Minister of Somalia from 2003 to 2004.

== Biography ==
Yusuf was born in Xarardheere district, Mudug 1941 in the former Italian Somaliland. He hails from Awrtable subclan of Darod. Yusuf was appointed prime minister on December 8, 2003, by then president of Somalia, Abdiqasim Salad Hassan. Yusuf left office on November 3, 2004, when Somalia's new president Abdullahi Yusuf Ahmed replaced him with Ali Muhammad Ghedi.

== Notes ==
Political offices
Preceded by Hassan Abshir Farah	Prime Minister of the Republic of Somalia; December 8, 2003–November 3, 2004	Succeeded by Ali Muhammad Ghedi
