= Mahad Mohamed Salad =

Somalian politician

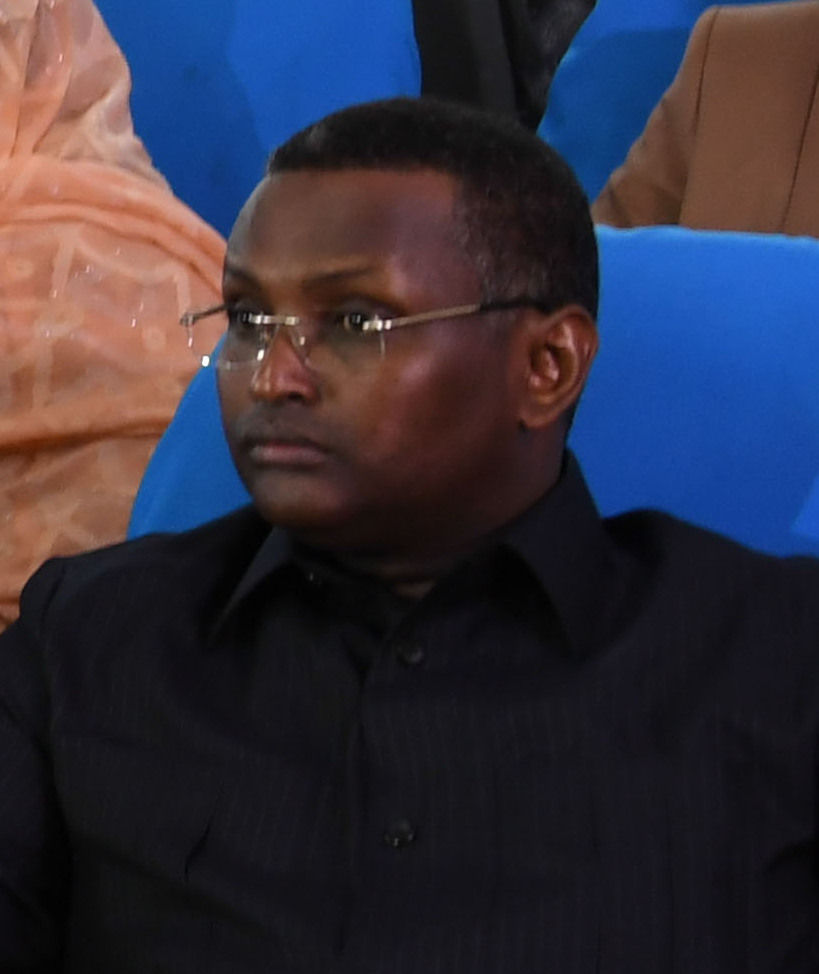

Director General of the National Intelligence and Security Agency
- Incumbent
- Assumed office 1 June 2025
- Prime Minister: Hamza Abdi Barre
- Preceded by: Abdullahi Mohamed Ali

Director General of the National Intelligence and Security Agency
- In office 22 August 2022 – 4 April 2024
- Prime Minister: Hamza Abdi Barre
- Preceded by: Abdulkadir Mohamed Nur
- Succeeded by: Abdullahi Mohamed Ali

State Minister for Presidential Palace
- In office 6 February 2015 – 1 March 2017
- Prime Minister: Omar Abdirashid Ali Sharmarke

Deputy Minister of Foreign Affairs of Somalia
- In office 17 January 2014 – 5 February 2015
- Prime Minister: Abdiweli Sheikh Ahmed
- Succeeded by: Abdirahman Abdi Mohamed

Personal details
- Born: 1980 (age 45–46) Harardhere Somalia
- Party: Peace and Development Party

Mahad Mohamed Salad Arabic: مهد محمد صلاد) is a Somali Minister. He has served as Director General of the National Intelligence and Security Agency (NISA) since June 2025, having previously held the position from August 2022 to April 2024. He previously served as the Deputy Minister of Foreign Affairs of Somalia in 2014. In February of the year 2015, Salad was appointed state Minister of presidential affairs by Prime Minister Omar Abdirashid Ali Sharmarke.

Mahad Mohamed Salad was appointed as the Director General of the National Intelligence and Security Agency by President Hassan Sheikh Mohamud in August 2022. He replaced Abdulkadir Mohamed Nur; who is incumbent Defence Minister of Somalia.
