= Abuukar Abdi Osman =

Somali politician

H.E. Amb. Abuukar Abdi Osman, Somali Ambassador to Malaysia 2nd Dec 2016 to Oct 2024, Dean of African Ambassadors and OIC Countries. Elected Member of AALA-EAC, 15/10/2025. Former Minister of Livestock & Forestry and Agriculture January 2009 and Former Defense Minister 2010. Former Minister of Environment and Regional Development, 2001 to 2005.

Minister of Livestock, Forestry, Range of Somalia
- Incumbent
- Assumed office 12 January 2015
- Prime Minister: Omar Abdirashid Ali Sharmarke

Personal details
- Born: 1955 (age 70–71) Somalia
- Party: Independent

Abuukar Abdi Osman is a Somali politician. He is the Minister of Livestock, Forestry and Range of Somalia, having been appointed to the position on 12 January 2015 by Prime Minister Omar Abdirashid Ali Sharmarke. The newly appointed cabinet failed to get the approval of the Parliament.
