= JSCS =

JSCS may refer to:

- a JavaScript analysis tool inspired by JSLint
- Jefferson–Scranton Community School District, Jefferson, Greene County, Iowa, USA
- Joint Service Combat Shotgun, see glossary of military abbreviations
- Journal of Septuagint and Cognate Studies, International Organization for Septuagint and Cognate Studies

== See also ==
- JSC (disambiguation) for the singular of JSCs
