= Abdulkadir Abdi Hashi =

Former Puntland Minister of State for Planning and International Cooperation

Abdulkadir Abdinur Hashi عبدالقادر عبدالنور حاشي
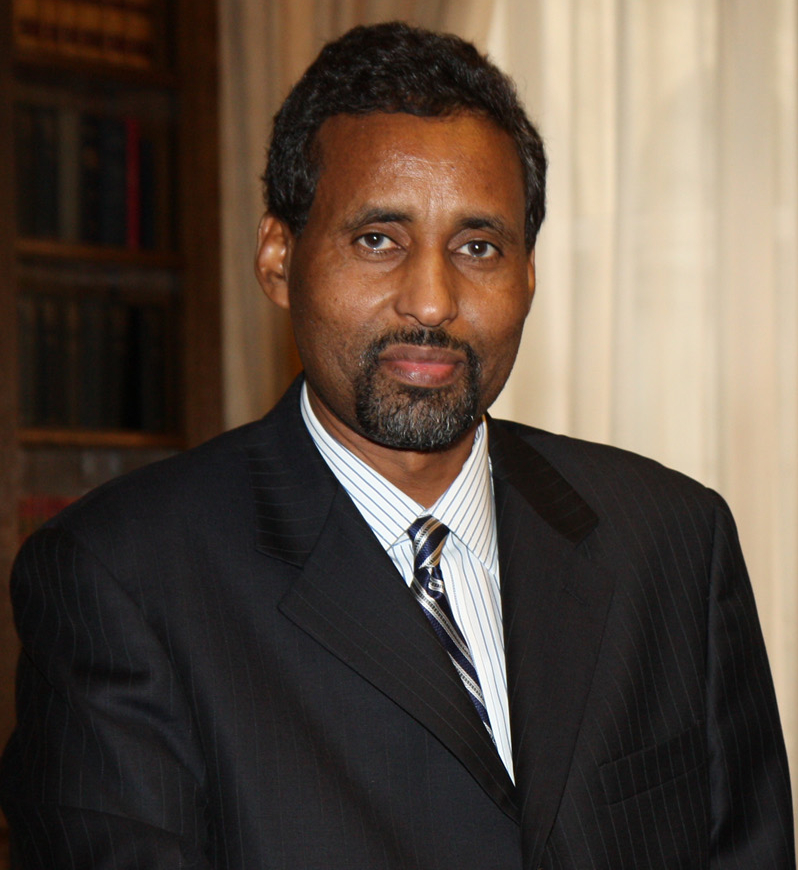

Minister of Education
- In office 24 June 2016 – 29 March 2017
- President: Hassan Sheikh Mohamud
- Prime Minister: Omar Abdirashid Ali Sharmarke
- Preceded by: Khadra Bashir Ali
- Succeeded by: Abdirahman Dahir Osman

Member of the Federal Parliament of Somalia
- Incumbent
- Assumed office 20 August 2012

Minister of State for Planning and International Cooperation
- In office 1 March 2010 – 20 August 2012

Minister of Constitutional Affairs of Somalia
- Incumbent
- Assumed office 17 January 2015

Personal details
- Born: Galkayo, Somalia

Abdulkadir Abdinur Hashi (Somali: Cabdulqaadir Cabdinuur Xaashi, Arabic: عبد القادر عبدالنور حاشي) is a Somali politician. He previously served as the Minister of State for Planning and International Cooperation of Puntland, and is a Member of the Federal Parliament of Somalia.

== Personal life ==
Hashi hails from Galkayo in the northeastern Puntland region of Somalia. He belongs to the Leelkase Tanade Darod clan.

== Career ==
=== Minister of the Presidency for Planning and International Relations of Puntland ===
On 1 March 2010, Hashi was appointed Puntland's State Minister of the Presidency for Planning and International Relations during a cabinet reshuffle.

=== Federal Parliament ===
On 20 August 2012, Hashi's term in office ended, when he was among the legislators nominated to the newly established Federal Parliament of Somalia.

=== Minister of Constitutional Affairs of Somalia ===
On 17 January 2015, Hashi was appointed the new Minister of Constitutional Affairs-designate of Somalia by Prime Minister Omar Abdirashid Ali Sharmarke.

=== Minister of Education, Culture and Higher Learning ===
On 24 June 2016, Hashi was appointed the new Minister of Education of Somalia by Prime Minister Omar Abdirashid Ali Sharmarke.

== See also ==
- Ali Haji Warsame
