= Ahmed Mohamed Mohamud =

Ahmed Mohamed Mohamud احمد محمد محمود

Minister of Health
- In office 17 January 2014 – 9 August 2014
- President: Hassan Sheikh Mohamud
- Prime Minister: Abdiweli Sheikh Ahmed
- Preceded by: Maryam Qaasim
- Succeeded by: Ali Mohamed Mohamud

General Ahmed Mohamed Mohamud (Somali: Axmed Maxamed Maxamuud, Arabic: احمد محمد محمود) is a Somali politician (not to be confused with Ahmed Mohamed Mohamoud "Silanyo"). He served as the Minister of Health of Somalia, having been appointed to the position on 17 January 2014 by Prime Minister Abdiweli Sheikh Ahmed. General Ahmed Mohamed Mohamud succeeded Maryam Qaasim when her post as Minister for Human Development and Public Services ended on 17 January 2014. The Ministry was split to allow the creation of 6 cabinet positions one of which was the Ministry of Health. The other 5 cabinet positions are Ministry of Education, Ministry of Culture and Higher Education, Ministry of Labour and Social Affairs, Ministry of Women and Human Rights, Ministry of Sports and Youth. After falling ill, Mohamud was replaced at the position on 9 August 2014 with former Minister of Tourism and Wildlife Ali Mohamed Mohamud.
