= Abdirahman Dahir Osman =

Somali politician

Abdirahman Dahir Osman MP
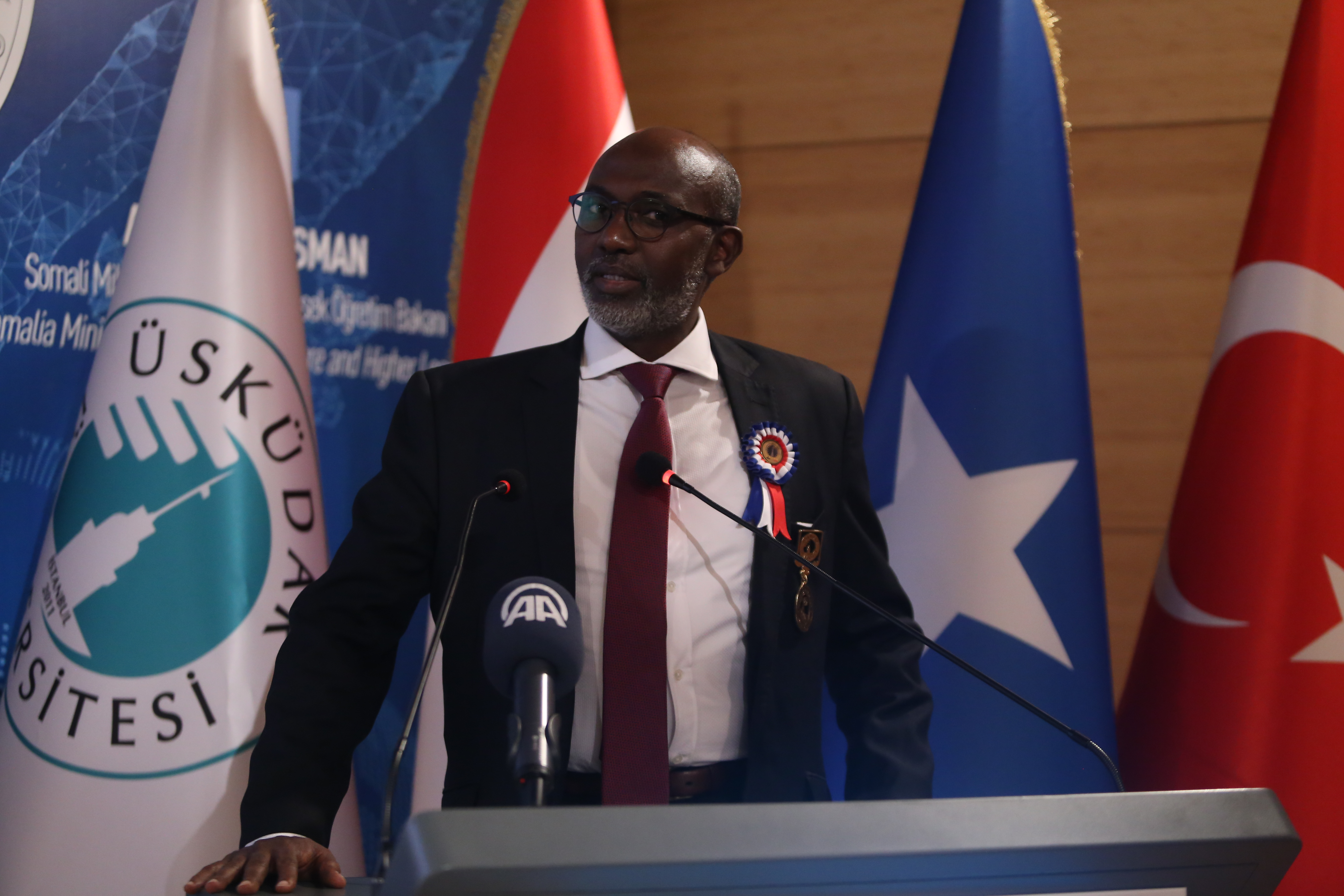

Minister of Education
- Incumbent
- Assumed office 29 March 2017
- President: Mohamed Abdullahi Mohamed
- Prime Minister: Hassan Ali Khaire
- Preceded by: Abdulkadir Abdi Hashi

Abdirahman Dahir Osman is a Somali politician. He is the current Ministry of Education of Somalia.
