= Ministry of Ports (Somalia) =

Government ministry of Somalia

- Coat of arms of Somalia

Agency overview
- Formed: 2012
- Jurisdiction: Somalia
- Headquarters: Mogadishu
- Agency executive: Abdullahi Ahmed Jama, Minister of Ports
- Parent agency: Cabinet of Somalia

The Ministry of Ports is a ministry responsible for overseeing marine transport and management of ports in Somalia.

The newly prime minister of Somalia Hamza Abdi Barre appointed his cabinets which includes by former minister of justice Abdullahi Ahmed Jama (ilka jiir) as Ministry of Ports and replaced former Maryan Aweys Jama.

In 2020, Somalia was becoming ready to accede to the list of port States after the country had completed the development of a Somali shipping code after six years. The process was supported by the International Maritime Organization (IMO) and the United Nations Assistance Mission in Somalia (UNSOM), which worked with the ministry on technical training and legal functions. Once passed by the parliament, the code will allow Somalia "to discharge its responsibilities as flag, port and coastal state."

== See also ==
- Agriculture in Somalia
