= Judiciary of Somalia =

The judiciary of Somalia is defined by the Provisional Constitution of the Federal Republic of Somalia. It stipulates that the national court structure is to be organized into three tiers: the Constitutional Court, Federal Government level courts, and Federal Member State level courts. A future nine-member Judicial Service Commission is empowered to appoint any federal tier member of the judiciary. It also selects and presents potential Constitutional Court judges to the House of the People of the Federal Parliament for approval. If endorsed, the President then appoints the candidate as a judge of the Constitutional Court. The five-member Constitutional Court is likewise empowered to adjudicate issues pertaining to the constitution, in addition to various federal and sub-national matters.

As of 2014, pending the adoption of new legislation, the pre-civil war judicial structure, courts and laws are in the process of being reformed to be applicable in Somalia's new federal system. In May 2014, the Council of Ministers approved a new Constitutional Review and Implementation Commission. Additionally, the Somali Bar Association has recommended that several federal and regional courts should be established to handle cases on a provincial basis. In this capacity, new local courts have been set up in areas that have been re-captured by the central government. In June 2014, the Minister of Justice and Constitutional Affairs Farah Sheikh Abdulkadir also announced that the Federal Parliament had approved a new law establishing the Judicial Service Commission. As part of a broader effort at reforming the judiciary, the office of the Attorney General also hired six additional women lawyers in April 2015. They are among 17 new attorneys attached to the office within the Ministry of Justice.

== Judicial authority ==
According to Article 105 of the constitution, the courts have judicial authority. The judicial structure is, in turn, regulated by a parliamentary law.

== Judicial independence ==
Article 106 establishes the functional independence of the judiciary from the federal government's other executive and legislative branches, subject only to the law.

A judge cannot be legally pursued in civil or criminal proceedings for exercising a judicial function. Authorization to search a judge or his or her home must also first be obtained from the Judicial Service Commission.

== Judicial procedure ==
Article 107 stipulates that although judicial proceedings are ordinarily open to the public, courts have the authority to decide under special circumstances whether hearings should instead be conducted in private. Situations that may warrant this include matters relating to national security, juveniles, rape, ethics or witness protection.

Additionally, all parties in a proceeding must first be accorded the opportunity to present their case before a judicial decision can be rendered.

Judicial decisions likewise should be accompanied with reasons explaining them.

== National courts ==
=== Structure ===
Per Article 108 of the constitution, the national court structure is organized into three tiers: the Constitutional Court, followed by the Federal Government level courts and then the Federal Member State level courts.

At the Federal Government tier, the highest court is the Federal High Court. The Federal Member State High Court is, in turn, the highest court at the Federal Member State level.

=== Jurisdiction ===
Article 109 formalizes the proceedings of the National Courts. It states that whenever a case pertaining to the Federal Government is presented before a court, the court will forward it to the Federal Government tier court.

Constitution-related cases may likewise be referred to the Constitutional Court. Provided that there is no conflict with the Constitutional Court's exclusive powers as outlined in Article 109C, any court with judicial powers has the discretion to determine if a case brought before it qualifies as a constitutional matter. The Constitutional Court is also the ultimate authority with regard to constitutional issues, and has sole jurisdiction on issues surrounding the interpretation of the constitution that have not developed out of court litigation. Furthermore, the government as well as any individual or groups may tender a reference application to the Constitutional Court on subjects of public interest.

Notwithstanding the above Article 109 points, the Federal Parliament is to pass a law specifying how the Federal Government tier courts are to interact in legal terms with the Federal Member State courts.

== Judicial Service Commission ==
Article 109A establishes the authority of a Judicial Service Commission consisting of nine members. In June 2014, the Federal Parliament approved a new law formalizing the commission.

The Judicial Service Commission includes:

- the Chief Judge of the Constitutional Court;
- the Chief Judge of the High Court;
- the Attorney General
- two members of the Somali Bar, appointed by the Somali Law Society for a four-year term;
- the Chair of the Human Rights Commission;
- three people from within Somali society who are at once held in high regard, proposed by the Cabinet, and then appointed by the President for a four-year term, eligible for renewal only once.

The Judicial Service Commission elects its chairperson from within its membership ranks. All members serve a term of five years, and are eligible for one additional term after their initial term has ended. They are also subject to a disciplinary regulation enacted by the Judicial Service Commission.

Pursuant to the law, the Judicial Service Commission is empowered to appoint, discipline and transfer any Federal tier member of the judiciary. It may also determine the compensation, pensions and other work related issues of the judiciary.

== Constitutional Court ==
=== Formation ===
Article 109B establishes the authority of a Constitutional Court consisting of five judges, including the Chief Judge and the Deputy Chief Judge.

The Judicial Service Commission is mandated to select as Constitutional Court judges exclusively individuals who hold the appropriate qualifications in terms of law and Shari'a, who are conversant with Constitutional matters, and who are of high moral character. Nominees are then presented to the House of the People of the Federal Parliament for approval. If endorsed, the President appoints the candidate as a judge of the Constitutional Court. The Chief Judge and Deputy Chief Judge are later chosen by the Constitutional Court judges from within their membership ranks.

=== Powers ===
According to Article 109C, at the request of Cabinet members, committees from the Federal Parliament's Upper and Lower Houses, or ten members from either House of the federal legislature, the Constitutional Court is empowered to review draft legislation and determine its constitutionality. It may also hear and decide on cases challenging whether a law passed by the Federal Parliament is compatible with the constitution, as per Article 86. Moreover, the Constitutional Court can also adjudicate cases related to constitutional issues that have not arisen out of Court litigation, as outlined below.

The Constitutional Court is likewise exclusively mandated to resolve disputes between the Federal Member State governments, or between the Federal Government and any Federal Member State government. It can also adjudicate dispute cases between organs of the Federal Government regarding each of their duties and powers. Additionally, it may hear and settle cases pertaining to the President's impeachment trials, in accordance with Article 92.

The date at which a verdict to nullify legislation comes into effect is, in turn, chosen by the Constitutional Court. With regard to legislation that is considered unconstitutional, the Court may determine the legislation to be void from either the time of judgement or enactment, or allow appropriate action pending invalidity from a specified future date. In doing so, it also takes into consideration what effect the timing of the invalidation might have on the stakeholders and other involved parties. In criminal cases, legislation later deemed unconstitutional by the Constitutional Court may be declared invalid from the time of enactment if it benefits an individual who has been convicted through this piece of legislation.

== List of chief justices ==
Below is a list of recent chief justices:

- Mohamed Omar Farah, December 2009 – November 2010
- Aidid Abdullahi Ilka-Hanaf, 2 April 2011 – 4 May 2016
- Ibrahim Idle Suleiman, 4 May 2016 – 27 May 2018
- Bashe Yusuf Ahmed, since 27 May 2018

== See also ==
- Constitution of Somalia
- Transitional Federal Charter of the Somali Republic
