= Judicial Service Commission =

Judicial Service Commission may refer to:

- Judicial Service Commission (Bangladesh)
- Judicial Service Commission (Botswana)
- Judicial Service Commission (Fiji)
- Judicial Service Commission (Kenya)
- Judicial Service Commission (Maldives)
- Judicial Service Commission (Namibia)
- Judicial Service Commission (Nepal)
- Judicial Service Commission (Nigeria)
- Judicial Service Commission (Somalia)
- Judicial Service Commission (South Africa)
- Judicial Service Commission (Sri Lanka)
- Thailand
  - Administrative Court Judicial Service Commission
  - Court of Justice Judicial Service Commission
- Judicial Service Commission (Uganda)
- Judicial Service Commission (Zimbabwe)

== See also ==
- Judicial Appointments Commission (United Kingdom)
- The proposed National Judicial Appointments Commission (India)
- Judicial Commission of Indonesia
- Judicial Commission of Pakistan
