= Maslah Mohammed Siad Barre =

Somali National Army general

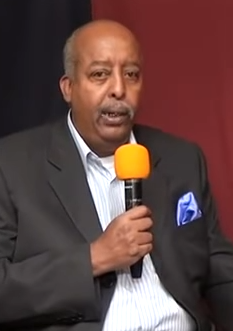
Barre in 2013

Maslah Mohammed Siad Barre was a Somali National Army general and son of longtime Somali ruler Mohamed Siad Barre. He was commanding the 77th Sector in Mogadishu in November 1987, and later became Chief of Staff (also reported as Commander-in-Chief) of the Army. His appointment as Commander of the Somali Armed Forces is dated to 26 February 1989. He was being groomed to succeed his father in the presidency.

On 12–13 November 1989, a group of Hawiye officers and men belonging to the 4th Division at Galkayo, in Mudug, mutinied. General Maslah lead a force of Marehan clansmen to suppress the mutiny. Punishment was meted out to local Hawiye villages.

After the Somali Civil War had ejected his father from the country, Maslah eventually settled in Kenya.

Twenty years later, Maslah was defeated by Sharif Sheikh Ahmed in the 2009 Somali presidential election. All candidates opposing Sheikh Ahmed, except Maslah Mohamed Siad, withdrew after the first round of voting; Sharif Ahmed then won the run-off with 293 to 126 votes.
