= Nur Hassan Hussein =

Somalian politician (1938–2020)

Nur Hassan Hussein Adde
- نور حسن حسين
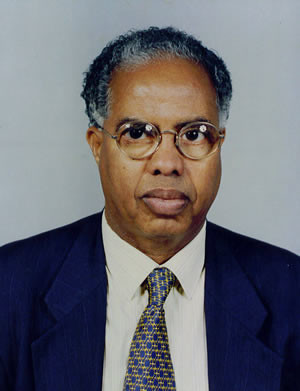
- Portrait of Prime Minister of Somalia Nur Hassan Hussein Adde.

5th Prime Minister of Somalia
- In office 24 November 2007 – 14 February 2009
- President: Abdullahi Yusuf Ahmed; Aden Madobe (Acting); Sharif Sheikh Ahmed
- Deputy: Ahmed Abdisalam
- Preceded by: Salim Aliyow Ibrow (Acting)
- Succeeded by: Omar Abdirashid Ali Sharmarke

Personal details
- Born: 2 February 1938 Mogadishu, Italian East Africa (present-day Somalia)
- Died: 1 April 2020 (aged 82) Camberwell, London, England
- Party: TFG
- Between 16 December 2008 – 24 December 2008 Mohamoud Mohamed Gacmodhere was prime minister in opposition.

Nur Hassan Hussein (Somali: Nuur Xasan Xuseen Cadde, Arabic: نور حسن حسين; 2 February 1938 – 1 April 2020), popularly known as Nur Adde, was a Somali politician, who served as Prime Minister of Somalia from November 2007 to February 2009. He was from Mogadishu and part of the Abgaal sub-clan of the Hawiye.

== Early career ==
Hussein began his professional career in the early 1950s as a police officer for Italian Somaliland before Somalia gained its independence. After completing studies in Law at the Somalia National University and the Fiscal Law School in Rome, Hussein became chief police officer and attorney general in 1987 under President Siad Barre, a post he held until 1991 when the Somali Civil War broke out. He subsequently served as the Secretary General of the Somali Red Crescent Society (SRCS).

== Prime minister ==
On 22 November 2007, then President of Somalia, Abdullahi Yusuf Ahmed, nominated Hussein as Prime Minister of the Transitional Federal Government following the earlier resignation of Ali Mohammed Ghedi on 29 October. Salim Aliyow Ibrow served as Interim Prime Minister between the tenure of Gedi and Hussein. Hussein was approved by Transitional Federal Parliament in Baidoa on 24 November, receiving 211 out of 212 votes, and he was sworn in immediately afterwards. Hussein's government, which he described as "all-inclusive", was appointed on 2 December, with 73 members; included in the government were 31 ministers, 11 state ministers, and 31 assistant ministers. Hussein received some criticism for the exceptionally large size of the Somali government; according to Hussein, in naming the government he followed the "4.5" formula or quota required by the 2004 Transitional Federal Charter, which provides for the division of posts between four main clans and a grouping of smaller clans. Four of the ministers—Hasan Muhammad Nur Shatigadud (who had been appointed Minister of Home Security), Abdikafi Hassan, Sheikh Aden Maden, and Ibrahim Mohamed Isaq—promptly resigned on 3 December, complaining that their clan, the Rahanwein (one of the four major clans), was inadequately represented in the government and that they had not been consulted on their appointments beforehand. On 4 December, Deputy Minister for Religious Affairs Sheikh Jama Haji Hussein also resigned, complaining of unfair allocation of posts in the government for his clan, the Jarerweyne, which is one of the smaller clans.

On 17 December, Hussein said that he was replacing his previously appointed government with a "smaller, more effective administration". This new government was planned to include only 17 ministers and five deputy ministers, and was also to include people from outside of Parliament.

Hussein appointed 15 ministers and five assistant ministers on 4 January 2008, and they were sworn in on 5 January. Three additional ministers remained to be named. Parliament approved the new Cabinet on 10 January, with 223 votes in favor, five opposing and two abstaining.

=== Peacekeeping and difficulties in office ===
Since the Prime Minister came to office, he pushed for continued peace and unity amongst the Somali nation. The peacekeeping truce which was signed in Djibouti in June 2008 was one of the outcomes of the work of Nur Adde and his government.

Hussein dismissed the Mayor of Mogadishu, Mohamed Omar Habeb Dhere, on 30 July 2008; he accused Habeb of incompetence, embezzlement, insubordination, and abuse of power. Habeb, however, resisted this and said that his dismissal had to be approved by President Yusuf; he claimed to have Yusuf's support to remain in office. According to Hussein, his decision was supported by the people of Mogadishu and by the city's traditional elders. The issue of Habeb's dismissal was believed to indicate deepening disagreement between Hussein and Yusuf.

Ten ministers (including two deputy prime ministers) and one assistant minister resigned from Hussein's Cabinet on 2 August 2008. The resigning ministers, most of whom were considered supporters of Yusuf, said that Hussein had not consulted them about Habeb's dismissal; they also criticized Hussein for failing to present a budget to parliament. Hussein reacted by accusing the resigning ministers of trying "to create political instability in the country and disrupt the implementation of the Djibouti agreement between the Somali Transitional Government and the opposition", but he asserted that the government was still functioning properly. At the same time, referring to moves in parliament to impeach him, Hussein said that he was willing to resign if parliament dissolved the government or if doing so would benefit the peace process.

Hussein appointed six new ministers on 3 August, saying that the remaining replacements would be appointed after consultations with the people. A no confidence motion against Hussein and his government was presented in Parliament on 25 August. The motion alleged incompetence and embezzlement and criticized the government for failing to present a budget or provide national stability and security. It was submitted by 90 members of Parliament; Parliament had two days to review the motion. Hussein strongly denied the accusations of incompetence and embezzlement.

Hussein and President Yusuf signed a deal on 26 August that was intended to resolve the dispute between them, and they said before Parliament on 28 August that they had agreed on a number of changes, including the addition of five members to the Cabinet and the dissolution of the administrations in Mogadishu and Banadir Region. The vote of confidence against Hussein's government was held on 1 September and was overwhelmingly defeated; there were 191 votes in favor of the government, nine votes against it, and two abstentions.

On 29 October 2008, the leaders of the Intergovernmental Authority on Development (IGAD) asked Hussein to form a new Cabinet in hopes of stabilizing the situation. Hussein said on 31 October that he would do so within 15 days, but that the ministers who had resigned would be excluded from the new Cabinet. He also expressed confidence that a new constitution would be "drafted very soon and subjected to a referendum" and that laws pertaining to political parties and elections would be passed by Parliament during the six months to follow.

President Yusuf announced on 14 December that he had dismissed Hussein and his government. Hussein said that Yusuf did not have the power to fire him without parliamentary approval, while Yusuf said that he believed Parliament would endorse the dismissal. Parliament supported Hussein in a vote on 15 December, but Yusuf nevertheless appointed Mohamoud Mohamed Gacmodhere as Prime Minister to replace Hussein on 16 December. Mustafa Duhullow, the Minister of Agriculture, described this as a "desperate measure" and a "personal wish that will not have legal effect". Guled announced his resignation on 24 December, and Hussein congratulated him on taking "the right step".

Hussein was a candidate for president in the parliamentary vote for that position, held in late January 2009. He placed third in the first round with 59 votes and then withdrew his candidacy; Sharif Ahmed won the election. Ahmed then chose Omar Abdirashid Ali Sharmarke to replace Hussein as Prime Minister on 13 February.

Hussein was appointed Somalia's ambassador to Italy in June 2009.

== Death ==
On 1 April 2020, during the COVID-19 pandemic, Hussein died at King's College Hospital in Camberwell, London whilst infected by COVID-19. He was 82.

== See also ==
- Somali Council of Ministers

Political offices
Preceded by Salim Aliyow Ibrow; Acting	Prime Minister of Somalia; 2007–2009	Succeeded by Omar Abdirashid Ali Sharmarke
