= Hawo Hassan Mohamed =

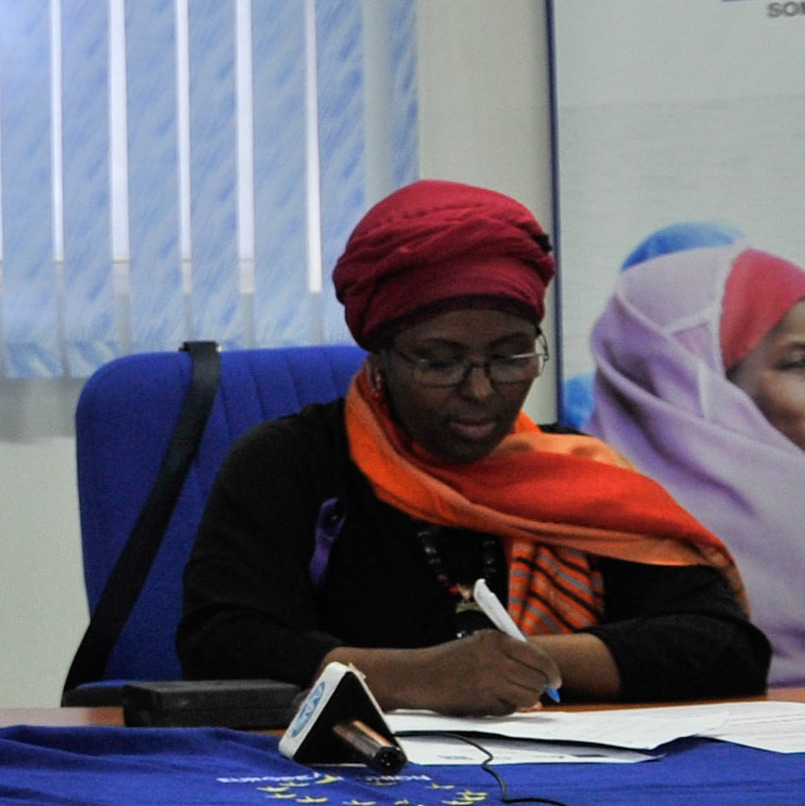
- in 2016

Minister of Health and Social Care
- In office 27 January 2015 – 24 June 2016
- President: Hassan Sheikh Mohamud
- Prime Minister: Omar Abdirashid Ali Sharmarke
- Succeeded by: Mohamed Haji AbdiNur

Personal details
- Born: Somalia
- Party: Independent

Hawo Hassan Mohamed is a Somali politician. She belongs to the Hadamo subclan of the Rahanweyn. She is the former Minister of Health and Social Care of Somalia, having been appointed to the position on 27 January 2015 by the now former Prime Minister Omar Abdirashid Ali Sharmarke. Hawo Hassan Mohamed was subsequently sacked from her post as Minister of Health and Social Care by former Prime Minister Omar Abdirashid Ali Sharmarke and replaced with Mohamed Haji AbdiNur on 24 June 2016.
