= Fatuma Abdullahi Insaniya =

Somali diplomat

Fatuma Abdullahi Mohamed Insaniya (Somali: Fadumo Cabdulaahi Insaniiyaa, Arabic: فطومة عبد الله إنسانييا) is a Somali diplomat. She has served as Ambassador to the United States and India.

== Biography ==
Insaniya hails from Dir sub clan of Surre.

Insaniya has served as the Ambassador of Somalia to the United States, based at the Somali embassy in Washington, D.C. Appointed on 2 April 2015, she was the first woman to be assigned to the office.

In 2019, Insaniya was appointed Ambassador of Somalia to India, succeeding Abyan Mohamed Salah.
