= Salim Aliyow Ibrow =

Somali politician

Salim Aliyow Ibrow سالم علييوو ايبرو
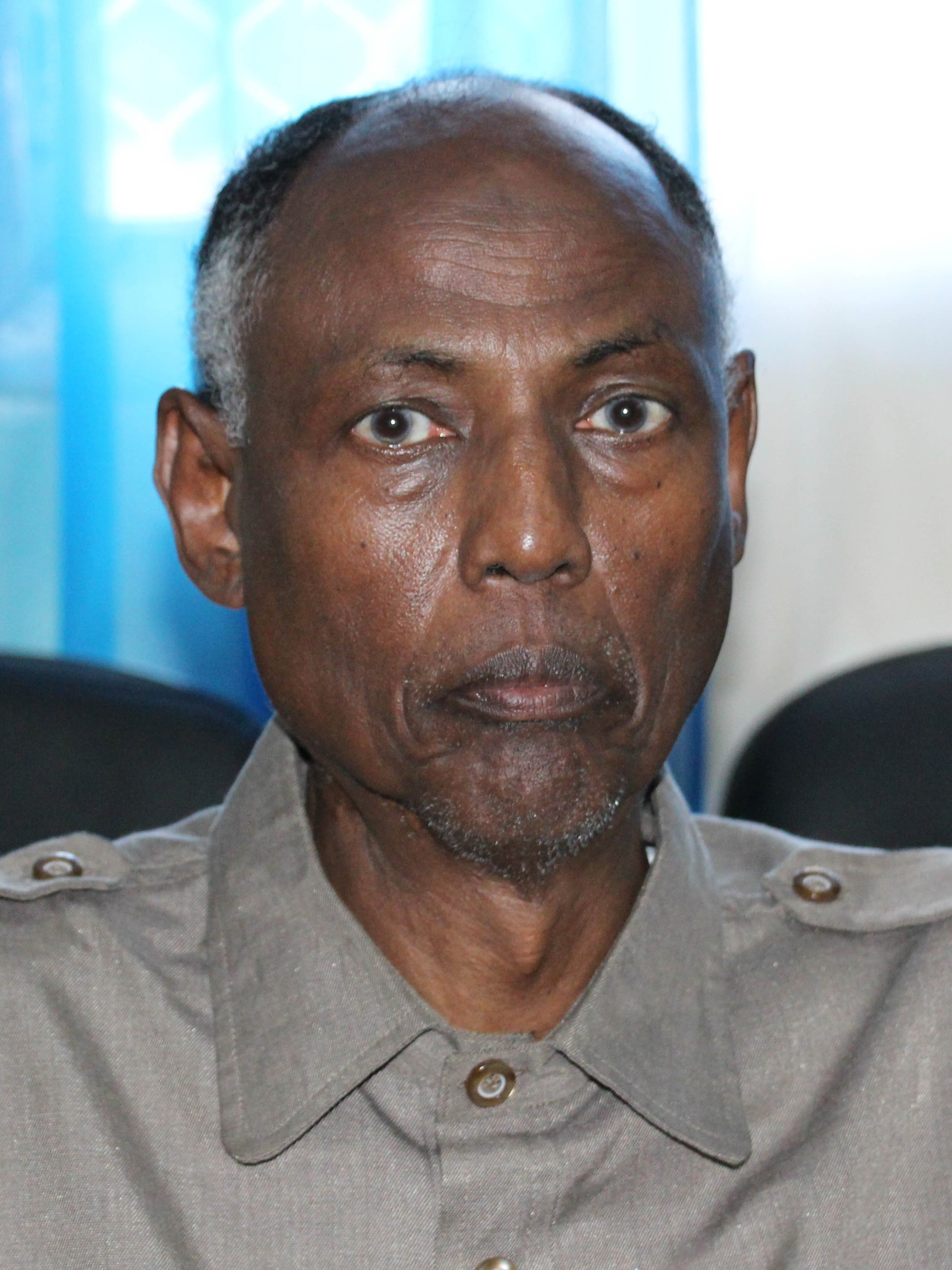

Prime Minister of Somalia Acting
- In office 29 October 2007 – 24 November 2007
- Preceded by: Ali Mohammed Ghedi
- Succeeded by: Nur Hassan Hussein

Minister of Justice and Constitutional Affairs of Somalia
- Incumbent
- Assumed office 25 October 2014
- Prime Minister: Abdiweli Sheikh Ahmed
- Preceded by: Farah Sh. Abdulkadir Mohamed

Minister of Environment and Livestock of Somalia
- In office 17 January 2014 – 25 October 2014
- Succeeded by: Farah Sh. Abdulkadir Mohamed

Personal details
- Born: 1942 (age 83–84) Somalia

Salim Aliyow Ibrow (Somali: Saalim Caliyoow Ibroow, Arabic: سالم علييوو ايبرو) (born in 1942) is a Somali politician. He briefly served as the acting prime minister of Somalia in 2007. From January to October 2014, Ibrow was also the Minister of Environment and Livestock. He was the Minister of Justice and Constitutional Affairs of Somalia.

== Career ==
=== Early career ===
Ibrow served as the interim prime minister of the Transitional Federal Government from October 29, 2007 to November 24, 2007, following the resignation of Premier Ali Mohammed Ghedi. Prior to his interim promotion, Ibrow served as Ghedi's deputy premier. His portfolio changed several times over numerous cabinet reshufflings over the years, including the ministries of Finance, Livestock, Culture and Higher Education.

Ibrow was one of the MPs contending for the Parliamentary Speaker's position after the dismissal of ex-Speaker Sharif Hassan Sheikh Aden. He is also the National Commissioner for UNESCO in Somalia.

Ibrow was replaced as prime minister by Nur Hassan Hussein on November 22, 2007, and was appointed Minister of Justice and Religious Affairs.

=== Minister of Environment and Livestock ===
On 17 January 2014, Ibrow was appointed Minister of Environment and Livestock (Minister of Veterinary and Animal Husbandry) by Prime Minister Abdiweli Sheikh Ahmed.

=== Minister of Justice and Constitutional Affairs of Somalia ===
On 25 October 2014, Ibrow's term as Minister of Veterinary and Animal Husbandry ended following a Cabinet reshuffle. He was replaced at the position with former Minister of Justice and Constitutional Affairs of Somalia Farah Sh. Abdulkadir Mohamed. Ibrow was in turn assigned Mohamed's office.

== Notes ==
Political offices
Preceded by Ali Mohammed Ghedi	Prime Minister of Somalia; October 29, 2007–November 24, 2007	Succeeded by Nur Hassan Hussein
