= Awad Ahmed Ashareh =

Somali politician

Awad Ahmed Ashareh عوض أحمد عشاره

Information, Public Awareness, Culture and Heritage Committee of Somalia

Awad Ahmed Ashareh (Somali: Cawaad Axmed Ashaareh, Arabic: عوض أحمد عشاره) is a Somali politician. He is the Chairman of the federal Information, Public Awareness, Culture and Heritage Committee of Somalia.
