= Abdirahman Abdi Mohamed =

Somali politician

Abdirahman Abdi Mohamed عبد الرحمن عبدي محمد

Deputy Minister of Foreign Affairs of Somalia
- Incumbent
- Assumed office 25 October 2014
- Prime Minister: Abdiweli Sheikh Ahmed
- Preceded by: Mahad Mohamed Salad

Abdirahman Abdi Mohamed (Somali: Cabdiraxmaan Cabdi Maxamed, Arabic: عبد الرحمن عبدي محمد) is a Somali politician who is the Deputy Minister of Foreign Affairs of Somalia, having been appointed to the position on 25 October 2014 by Prime Minister Abdiweli Sheikh Ahmed.
