= Abdullahi Ahmed Jama =

Somali politician

Abdullahi Ahmed Jama General Ilkajir عبد الله أحمد جامع
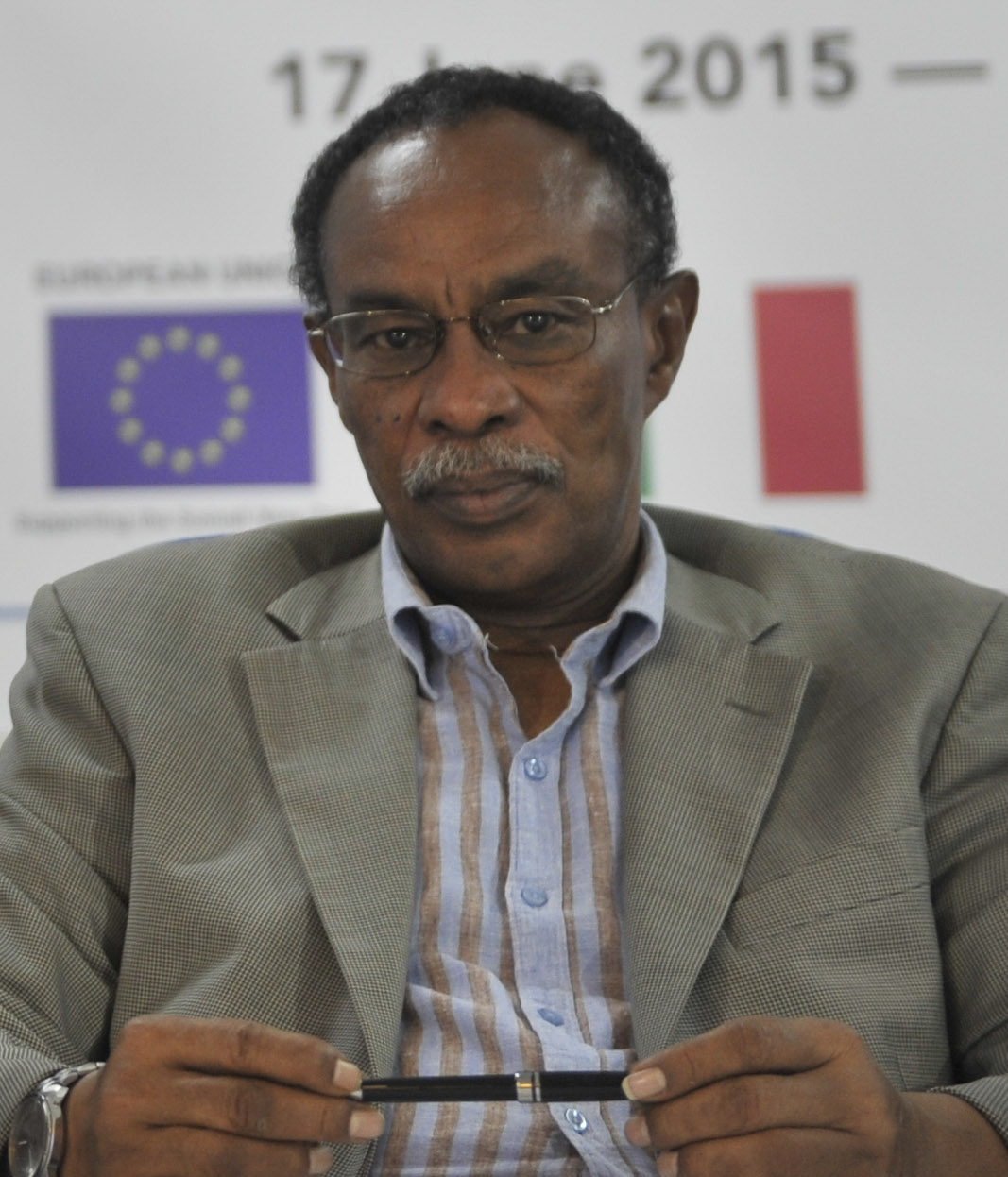

Minister of Justice
- In office 6 February 2015 – 29 March 2017
- President: Hassan Sheikh Mohamud
- Prime Minister: Omar Abdirashid Ali Sharmarke
- Succeeded by: Hassan Hussein Hajji

Minister of Education
- In office 12 January 2015 – 17 January 2015
- President: Hassan Sheikh Mohamud
- Prime Minister: Omar Abdirashid Ali Sharmarke
- Preceded by: Ahmed Mohamed Gurase
- Succeeded by: Khadra Bashir Ali

Interior Minister of Puntland
- In office 17 January 2009 – 5 February 2014
- President: Abdirahman Mohamud Farole
- Vice President: Abdisamad Ali Shire
- Preceded by: Ali Abdi Aware
- Succeeded by: Ahmed Elmi Osman

Minister of Ports and Marine Transport
- In office 2 August 2022 – 21 October 2024
- Prime Minister: Hamza Abdi Barre
- Preceded by: Maryan Aweys Jama
- Succeeded by: Mohamud Ahmed Adan

Personal details
- Born: March 13, 1951 (age 75) Erigavo, Sanag, Somaliland Protectorate
- Children: 5
- Occupation: Political, Military General
- Awards: 1 Silver Medal; 2 Bronze Medal
- Nickname: Ilka-Jiir

Military service
- Rank: Major General
- Battles/wars: Ogaden War

General Abdullahi Ahmed Jama Ilkajiir (Somali: Cabdulaahii Axmed Jamac Ilkajiir, Arabic: عبد الله أحمد جامع) is a Somali politician, who was Puntland's Interior Minister from 17 January 2009 to 5 February 2014. He is the former Minister of Education of Somalia, having been appointed to the position on 12 January 2015 by the former Prime Minister Omar Abdirashid Ali Sharmarke. However, he only served 2 weeks when on 17 January 2015, Prime Minister Sharmarke dissolved his newly nominated cabinet due to vehement opposition by legislators, who rejected the reappointment of certain former ministers.

On 27 January 2015, Sharmarke appointed a new, smaller 20 minister cabinet of which Abdullahi Ahmed Jama was replaced by Khadra Bashir Ali. On 6 February, Sharmarke finalized his cabinet, consisting of 26 ministers, 14 state ministers, and 26 deputy ministers of which Abdullahi Ahmed Jama was reinstated but was now the Minister of Justice. He has now been succeeded by Hassan Hussein Hajji.

2 August 2022, newly prime minister Hamza Abdi Barre appointed his cabinets which includes by Abdullahi Ahmed Jama (ilka jiir) as Ministry of Ports (Somalia). On 21 October 2024 was replaced by Mohamud Ahmed Adan.

== Biography ==
Jama was born on March 13, 1951, in Erigavo, a town in British Somaliland. He is from the Warsangali clan

He completed his primary education at Dayaha, a boarding school near Erigavo. Upon graduating, he was accepted into the newly established the National Teachers’ Education Center (NTEC) at the outskirts of Mogadishu, known as Lafole. Jama joined the Somali National Army and attended the Military Academy in Odesa (Ukraine), earning his first degree in military science in 1973. At first he was nicknamed Ilkajir, an it was later adopted as a surname.

From 1980 to 1983, he attended the Staff College in Cairo, Egypt earning a master's degree in military science. In 1988-89, he also attended the US Army War College in Carlisle, Pennsylvania and earned a diploma in strategy and decision-making. In 2000, Jama attended Bryan & Stratton College at Rochester, NY and earned a degree in Accounting.

As a career military officer and leader, Jama held many positions in the Somali National Army: from Battalion Commander to Army Commander. He was by far the youngest Officer to head the Directorate of Operations of the Somali National Army.

Jama is a veteran of the 1977 Ogaden war, where he received two bronze medals and one silver medal for bravery as well as numerous certificates of merit for outstanding conduct.

== Puntland ==
In August 2008, Ilka-jiir promised of running in and participating the upcoming Puntland presidential election. Ilkajir received a huge welcome throughout Badhan District.

After having lost the Puntland macro-region's 2009 presidential race to Abdirahman Mohamud Farole, Ilkajir was appointed by Farole to the position of Interior Minister in Puntland's cabinet in what was widely seen as a welcome attempt to settle political differences.

Ilka-jiir's new role as Puntland's Interior Minister includes duties such as forming local district/regional governors across Puntland, areas which now also include the former Maakhir.
