= Ali Mohammed Ghedi =

Somalian politician

Ali Mohamed Gedi علي محمد جيدي
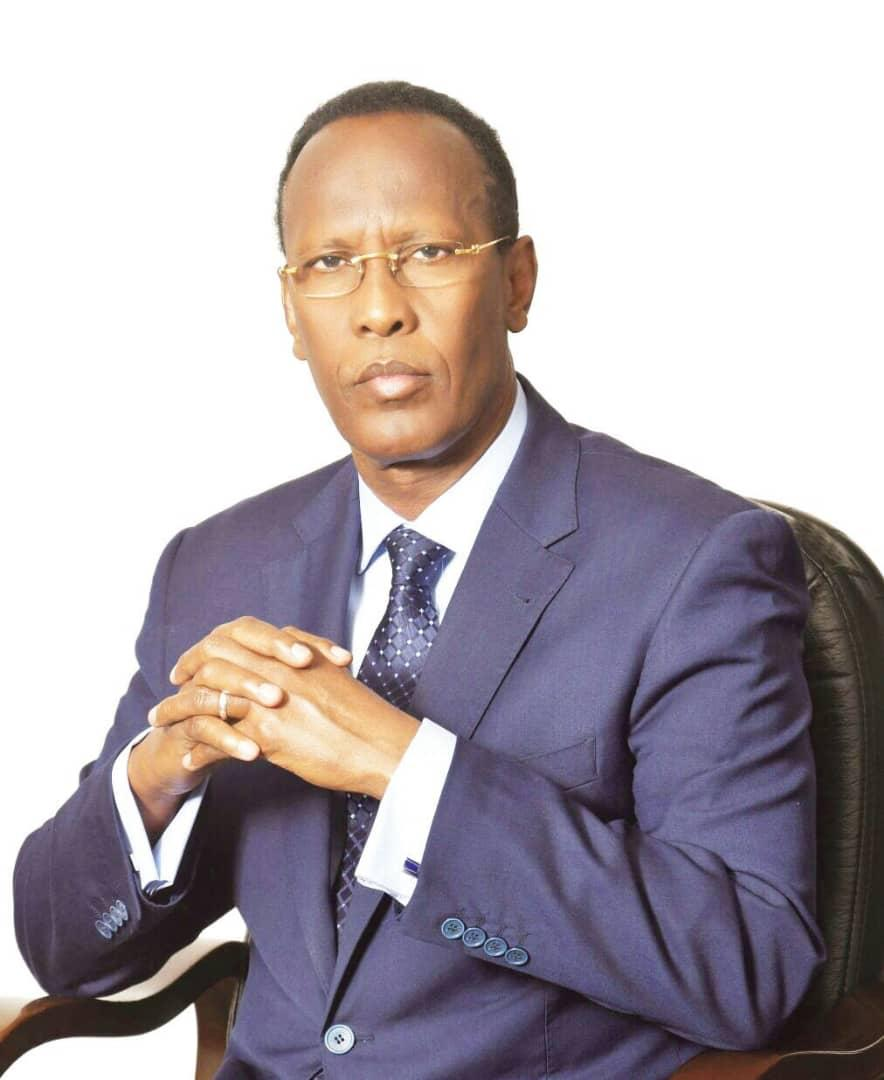

4th Prime Minister of Somalia
- In office 1 November 2004 – 29 October 2007
- Preceded by: Mohamed Yusuf Dheliye
- Succeeded by: Salim Aliyow Ibrow

Personal details
- Born: 2 October 1952 (age 74) Jowhar, Trust Territory of Somaliland (present-day Somalia)
- Party: TFG
- Spouse: Fadumo Hassan Ali
- Children: 4
- Education: Mogadishu University
- Occupation: Politician

Ali Mohammed Gedi (Somali: Cali Maxamed Geeddi, Arabic: علي محمد جيدي) (born 2 October 1952), popularly known as Ali Gedi, is a Somali politician who served as Prime Minister of the Transitional Federal Government (TFG) from 2004 to 2007.

A former academic and veterinary doctor based in Addis Ababa, Gedi was a little-known figure prior to his appointment in November 2004, the result of intensive lobbying by the Ethiopian government. Widely viewed as corrupt and an impediment to reconciliation, he resigned in October 2007 was replaced by Nur Hassan Hussein as PM.

== Early life ==
Ali Mohamed Gedi was born in Mogadishu, Somalia, in 1952. He is from the Abgaal sub-clan of the Hawiye. Gedi was raised by his paternal grandmother and later by his stepmother. Gedi's father was an officer in the military and in 1978 joined the National Security Service (NSS) under the reign of Siad Barre at the rank of Colonel. Gedi was recruited by the NSS during high school and college, tasked with surveilling and reporting on fellow students.

He went on to the University of Pisa, graduating in 1978 and was subsequently employed by the Somali National University as an assistant lecturer. From 1980 to 1983, he studied at the University of Pisa for postgraduate studies and obtained a Doctorate Degree in Veterinary Pathology and Surgery. He then returned to teaching in 1983 as a lecturer and headed the department until 1990.

== Political career ==
During the outbreak of the Somali Civil War, Gedi worked for warlord Ali Mahdi of the United Somali Congress. He was Mahdi's assistant defense secretary during the fierce fighting in Mogadishu of the early 1990s. In general, Gedi was relatively unknown in political circles until his appointment as prime minister to the TFG during 2004.

=== Transitional Federal Government ===
Abdullahi Yusuf appointed Ali Mohammed Gedi as his prime minister. However, on 11 December 2004, parliament passed a vote of no confidence in Gedi’s government, declaring his appointment unconstitutional. Despite this, Yusuf reappointed Gedi only two days later, though by the end of the year, Gedi had not reconstituted his cabinet. According to I.M. Lewis, Yusuf's election as president and his appointment of Gedi, who had ties to Ethiopian prime minister Meles Zenawi, were heavily influenced by Ethiopia. These connections played a key role in the Ethiopian invasion of Somalia in 2006. The New York Times reported that, "Mr. Gedi’s rise to power was essentially an Ethiopian creation." Ethiopian officials heavily lobbied for his ascension to prime minister.

In March 2005, a debate on deploying foreign troops, including Ethiopian forces, to Somalia led to violence after the resolution was rejected by a vote of 156 to 55. A brawl was initiated by some opposing the result, injuring several MPs, and the vote was declared invalid thereafter. By insisting on the deployment of foreign troops from countries bordering Somalia, Ali Gedi and Yusuf disregarded the views of their cabinet, a clear majority of transitional parliament, and much of the public.

During June 2005, the TFG moved into Somalia for the first time and promised to establish its authority across the country. Instead it quickly devolved into infighting, and serious internal divisions arose. A seat of power could not be agreed on. 100 members of the 275-strong parliament - led by Speaker Sharif Hassan Aden - chose to move to Mogadishu, stating they would try to restore stability to the capital. On the other hand President Abdullahi Yusuf, Prime Minister Ali Gedi and their supporters set up base in Jowhar, 90 km north of Mogadishu, citing insecurity in the capital.

=== Ethiopian invasion and insurgency ===
In March 2006, fighting broke out between the Alliance for the Restoration of Peace and Counter-Terrorism (ARPCT) warlords and the Islamic Court Union (ICU) over the control of Mogadishu, which intensified in May. The prime minister demanded the warlords, four of whom were members of the TFG government, to cease fighting the ICU, but this command was universally ignored and so Ghedi dismissed them from Parliament. These included National Security Minister Mohamed Afrah Qanyare, Commerce Minister Musa Sudi Yalahow, Militia Rehabilitation Minister Issa Botan Alin and Religious Affairs Minister Omar Muhamoud Finnish. On 13 August 2006, Ghedi reshuffled his cabinet.

Gedi had publicly pushed claims that 8,000 foreign fighters were fighting for the ICU prior to the Ethiopian invasion. During December 2006, Ethiopian and TFG troops entered Mogadishu. On January 1, 2007, he announced "The warlord era in Mogadishu is now over." Ghedi's first actions included declaring martial law for three months, calling for the disarmament of the militias, and the appointment of new judges. The directives that were issued, which included a ban on public meetings, attempts to organize political campaigns and major media outlets, was enforced by Ethiopian troops. Warlord militia checkpoints began reappearing on Mogadishu roads and insecurity started once again returning to the city. Gedi was the target of an assassination of attempt.

=== Corruption and resignation ===
Gedi was widely viewed as corrupt and was replaced by Nur Hassan Hussein as PM during late 2007. One of the major controversies that precipitated his resignation was a dispute with over a $32 million donation from Saudi Arabia, intended to fund a national reconciliation conference. Gedi kept a substantial portion of the funds for himself, which led to a breakdown in relations between the two leaders. Frustrated by the political stalemate within the TFG, U.S. and Ethiopian officials reportedly intervened. Gedi was summoned to Addis Ababa for negotiations, where he spent several days in closed-door meetings with American and Ethiopian diplomats.

In exchange for stepping down, Gedi was granted asylum in the United States and permitted to retain some of the remaining Saudi funds. He subsequently relocated to Los Angeles, where U.S. officials were said to have arranged an academic position for him at the University of California.

Gedi announced his resignation before parliament in Baidoa on October 29, 2007, due to differences with the Somali president, Abdullahi Yusuf. It is rumored that Gedi accepted to resign for future political support. He remained a member of parliament. In early 2008, Gedi announced that he would run for presidency in 2009.
