= Judicial Service Commission (Somalia) =

Agency overview
- Type: Judiciary
- Jurisdiction: Federal Government of Somalia
- Headquarters: Mogadishu, Somalia; 2°04′00″N 45°22′00″E
- Parent agency: Ministry of Justice

The Judicial Service Commission is an adjunct of the Ministry of Justice of the Federal Government of Somalia.

== Overview ==
Article 109A of the Provisional Constitution establishes the authority of a Judicial Service Commission consisting of nine members. In June 2014, the Federal Parliament of Somalia approved a new law formalizing the commission.

In March 2015, the Office of the President issued a decree dissolving the extant Judicial Service Commission. It recommended instead reformation of the Commission in accordance with Article 109 of the Provisional Constitution.

In late March 2015, the Federal Government began formally reconstituting the Judicial Service Commission. According to the Presidential Adviser on Law Omar Mohamed Abdulle, the new commission is slated to consist of nine members per the constitution. These officials would in turn be chosen from among the extant governmental agencies, as they have the quorum necessary for decision-making and assembly.

In May 2015, in accordance with Article 109A of the Provisional Constitution, the Federal Cabinet endorsed a new Judicial Service Commission. The reconstituted committee will initially consist of seven members, with two officials pending approval.

== Composition ==
=== Positions ===
The positions within the Judicial Service Commission include:

- the Chief Judge of the Constitutional Court;
- the Chief Judge of the High Court;
- the Attorney General
- two members of the Somali Bar, appointed by the Somali Law Society for a four-year term;
- the Chair of the Human Rights Commission;
- three people from within Somali society who are at once held in high regard, proposed by the Cabinet, and then appointed by the President for a four-year term, eligible for renewal only once.

The Judicial Service Commission elects its chairperson from within its membership ranks. All members serve a term of five years and are eligible for one additional term after their initial term has ended. They are also subject to a disciplinary regulation enacted by the Judicial Service Commission.

=== Members ===
As of May 2015, the members of the Judicial Service Commission include:

- Aydid Abdullahi Ilka-Hanaf – Chief Judge of the High Court
- Ahmed Ali Dahir – Attorney General
- Marian Haji Elmi – Somali Law Society
- Issei Ahmed Warsame – Somali Law Society
- Sharif Sheikh Mayow – Civil Society
- Ahmed Abdullahi Hussein – Civil Society
- Osman Sheikh Ibrahim – Civil Society

== Functions ==
Pursuant to the law, the Judicial Service Commission is empowered to appoint, discipline and transfer any Federal tier member of the judiciary. It may also determine the compensation, pensions and other work related issues of the judiciary.

== See also ==
- Constitutional Review and Implementation Commission
