= Mohamoud Mohamed Guled =

Somali politician (born 1954)

Mohamed Gacmodhere محمد محموغعمدار

Interior Minister of Somalia

Personal details
- Born: 1954 (age 71–72) Hobyo, Somalia

Dr. Mohamed Mohamud Guled Ga'modhere (Somali: Maxamed Maxamuud Guuleed Gacmodhere, Arabic: محمد محموغعمدار) was Somalia's interior minister, and formerly the Minister of Public Works and Housing. His portfolio was swapped on February 7, 2007, with that of Hussein Mohamed Farah Aidid.

== Biography ==
Nicknamed "long-handed" or "Gacmadheere," Guled was born in Somalia in 1954 in the district of Hobyo. As a child, he attended Quranic schools and completed his elementary education in the Mudug region.

Gacmadheere pursued his secondary education in Syria, and then moved on to Iraq and Romania, where he eventually obtained Bachelor's, Master's and PHD degrees in the fields of Economics and Agriculture.

Besides Somali, he speaks Arabic, Italian, Romanian and English.

Gacmadheere began his professional career as a trader before moving on to politics. In the late 1980s, he was imprisoned by Somalia's then ruling military government for dissent.

He was reportedly a leader of Mogadishu's civil society groups, and opposed the armed factions led by warlords as well as the sectarian clan violence that had engulfed the nation after the collapse of the central government.

== Transitional National Government (TNG) ==
Gacmadheere contended in the 2000 presidential elections held in Djibouti, but eventually lost to Abdikassim Salat Hassan. He was also for a brief period a political advisor to Ali Khalif Galaid who at the time was Somalia's Prime Minister.

== Transitional Federal Government (TFG) ==
Gacmadheere was initially appointed as Minister of Public Works and Housing. However, on February 7, 2007, his portfolio was swapped with that of Interior Minister Hussein Mohamed Farah Aidid, making him the new Interior Minister.

On February 15, he blamed instability in Somalia on the "terrorist attacks" conducted by members of the Islamic Courts Union (ICU), a movement which declared itself the Popular Resistance Movement (PRM). He announced that checkpoints were established by Somali and Ethiopian forces to conduct searches for the Islamists.
