= Omar Sharmarke =

Former Prime Minister of Somalia

Omar Sharmarke Cumar Sharmaarke عمر شرماركي
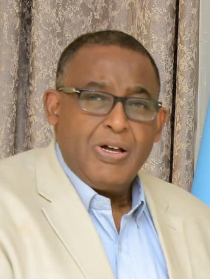

6th & 11th Prime Minister of Somalia
- In office 24 December 2014 – 1 March 2017
- President: Hassan Sheikh Mohamud; Mohamed Abdullahi Mohamed
- Preceded by: Abdiweli Sheikh Ahmed
- Succeeded by: Hassan Ali Khaire
- In office 14 February 2009 – 21 September 2010
- President: Sharif Sheikh Ahmed
- Preceded by: Nur Hassan Hussein
- Succeeded by: Abdiwahid Elmi Gonjeh (Acting)

Personal details
- Born: Omar Abdirashid Ali Sharmarke; 18 June 1960 (age 66) Mogadishu, Trust Territory of Somaliland
- Party: Independent
- Education: Carleton University

Omar Abdirashid Ali Sharmarke (Somali: Cumar Cabdirashiid Cali Sharmaarke, Arabic: عمر عبد الرشيد شرماركي) (born 18 June 1960) is a Somali diplomat and politician. From 2009 to 2010, he was the Prime Minister of Somalia. He subsequently briefly served as Somalia's Ambassador to the United States in 2014. In December 2014, Sharmarke was reappointed Prime Minister of Somalia. His term ended on 1 March 2017, and he was replaced by Hassan Ali Khaire.

== Personal life ==
Omar Abdirashid Ali Sharmarke was born in 1960 in Mogadishu, situated in the southeastern Banaadir province of Somalia. He is the son of the former second president and first prime minister of Somalia, Abdirashid Ali Shermarke, who was assassinated in 1969, and Rukiyo Mo’alim Daahir, the daughter of the well-known Somali Islamic scholar Mo’alim Dahir Ali Boss. His family belongs to the Osman Mahamoud sub-clan of the larger Majeerteen Harti Darod clan, and originally hails from Somalia's northeastern Puntland region.

Sharmarke studied at Carleton University in Ottawa, where he earned degrees in political science and political economy. Although his family is based in Virginia, United States, he holds dual citizenship in both Somali and Canada.

== Career ==
=== Early career ===
Sharmarke has worked in a diplomatic capacity for the United Nations in Sri Lanka 2006 and Sierra Leone, and served as a political advisor on the Darfur conflict in Sudan. Before becoming prime minister, he was Somalia's Ambassador-designate to the United States.

=== Prime Minister of Somalia, 1st term ===
==== Appointment ====
On February 13, 2009, then-President of Somalia, Sheikh Sharif Sheikh Ahmed, nominated Sharmarke to become prime minister at a meeting in Djibouti. Sharmarke's nomination was widely welcomed, with a spokesman for the moderate Islamic Courts movement describing him as an "honest" man who should bring about "positive changes."

Political analysts were optimistic about the selection. It was seen as a successful attempt to shore up support for the Transitional Federal Government both among the diaspora and within the country. Sharmarke was considered someone who could potentially bridge the gap between the various groups currently competing for influence in Somalia, as he was based abroad and thus not tied to local politics. Some analysts also saw Sharmarke's appointment as an attempt to secure the favor of the large Darod clan, whose Majeerteen branch both Sharmarke and the outgoing President of Somalia, Abdullahi Yusuf Ahmed, were members of.

On February 14, lawmakers approved Sharmarke as prime minister with a vote of 414 in favour, 9 opposed and 2 not voting.

In his acceptance speech, Sharmarke pledged to encourage reconciliation and to create unity in Somalia. However, the Al-Shabaab Islamist insurgents who are currently waging war against the federal government, condemned his appointment, with a spokesman for the group saying that "an unlawful camel never gives birth to lawful ones."

On February 21, Radio Garowe reported that Prime Minister Sharmarke had selected a new Council of Ministers, reserving key posts for former opposition lawmakers. Before a meeting in Djibouti attended by President Sheikh Sharif Ahmed and a host of other Somali politicians and international observers, Sharmarke appointed Sheikh Abdulkadir Ali Omar, the Islamic Courts senior ground commander, as the Minister of Interior, and former parliament Speaker, Sharif Hassan Sheikh Adan, as the new Minister of Finance. Sharmarke also appointed the scholar, Mohamed Abdi Gandhi, as Minister of Defense, and three women as Ministers of Health, Family Affairs, and Rural Development. The new Cabinet easily gained a parliamentary vote-of-confidence. Sharmarke and the rest of the federal government then relocated from Djibouti to Mogadishu.

==== Stand-off ====
In April and May 2010, a rift developed between Prime Minister Sharmarke and then Speaker of Parliament, Adan Mohamed Nuur Madobe, which culminated in the Speaker's resignation after parliament later voted to remove him from office. Despite Madobe agreeing to relinquish his duties as Speaker, the incumbent President Sharif announced shortly afterwards his dismissal of Prime Minister Sharmarke and his intention to form a new government. This move was quickly welcomed by the UN Special Representative for Somalia, Ahmedou Ould-Abdallah, a close associate and supporter of Sharif. Ould-Abdallah himself came under fire for his reportedly disruptive role in the continuing conflict in southern Somalia, including meddling in local politics and attempting to advance foreign agendas.

In response, Prime Minister Sharmarke told the press that Sharif did not have the authority to dismiss him, and stated that he would remain in office until parliament passes a vote of no confidence. Sharmarke added that he "met the president and informed him that I wouldn't submit a resignation because his decision is not supported by the transitional charter", and that “the government is formed in accordance with the constitution and the national charter... Articles 44 and 51 of the constitution say that the government can only be dissolved through a vote of no confidence from the parliament. So no parliament has cast the vote against the government.”

On May 18, a top official with the African Union urged the federal leaders to settle their differences and unite to resolve the ongoing conflict. Supporters of Prime Minister Sharmarke were also reported to have gathered in the north-central Mudug region of Somalia to protest in his defense.

On 20 May, President Sharif reversed his decision to sack Prime Minister Sharmarke after consulting with lawyers, who advised Sharif that the dismissal was indeed unconstitutional. Analysts also stated that the move has severely undermined Sharif's credibility, as well as that of the U.N. representative, Ould-Abdallah, who had backed him.

On 26 May, following another disagreement with Prime Minister Sharmarke, incumbent President Sharif again announced his unilateral plan to appoint a new Premier. Associates of Sharif's also reportedly attempted to persuade Sharmarke to resign, but the Premier again refused to step down and vowed instead to remain in office until his tenure constitutionally expires. Abdirahman Mohamud Farole, the incumbent President of Somalia's autonomous Puntland region in the northeast, attempted to help settle the dispute, warning that if not resolved amicably, the rift could result in the ultimate collapse of the Transitional Federal Government.

In September 2010, disagreements again arose between Prime Minister Sharmarke and President Sharif, this time over the nation's draft constitution, an initiative supported by the United Nations, the European Union and the United States. Sharmarke reportedly wanted the document put before parliament and civil society members, while the president wanted it to be put to a referendum. On September 14, it was reported that the Premier had convened with MPs and ministers at the presidential residence to discuss the issue, where Sharmarke indicated that he would welcome a resolution to the dispute but would not step down. In a parliamentary meeting the following day, Sharif requested "changes" to the interim government; a motion calling for a vote of no confidence in the Premier was then put forward. However, on September 18, the new Speaker of the Parliament Sharif Hassan Sheikh Adan reportedly called off a parliamentary session when the vote of confidence was expected to take place.

In response to the rift, representatives from the United Nations, the African Union and IGAD, who had already tried to serve as mediators, released a joint statement warning that the dispute is unhelpful and self-defeating. Puntland President Abdirahman Mohamud Farole in an interview likewise urged the federal government's leaders to set aside their differences for the sake of the country. Farole added that the "government [TFG] has a short time in office remaining and it should not be changed. This is also the position of countries who are interested in Somali affairs".

Critics have also accused President Sharif of attempting to force Prime Minister Sharmarke out of office to remain in power beyond his term's expiry in August 2011.

==== Resignation ====
In May 2010, the Parliamentary Speaker Adan Mohamed Nuur Madobe resigned after parliament voted to remove him from office due to a rift between him and Prime Minister Sharmarke. Following this, President Sharif Sheikh Ahmed announced his dismissal of Prime Minister Sharmarke and his intention of forming a new government. This move was quickly welcomed by the UN Special Representative for Somalia, Ahmedou Ould-Abdallah. Sharmarke was succeeded as prime minister by Mohamed Abdullahi Mohamed (Farmajo), who in turn took over from the caretaker Premier Abdiwahid Elmi Gonjeh.

=== Interim Juba Administration ===
In 2013, Sharmarke helped establish the autonomous Interim Juba Administration in southern Somalia.

=== Ambassador of Somalia to the United States ===
In July 2014, Sharmarke was appointed Somalia's new Ambassador to the United States. The first such envoy in over two decades, he headed the Somali federal government's reopened embassy in Washington, D.C.

=== Prime Minister of Somalia, 2nd term ===
==== Appointment ====
On 17 December 2014, Sharmarke was reappointed Prime Minister of Somalia by President Hassan Sheikh Mohamud. He replaced Abdiweli Sheikh Ahmed, who was voted out of office by the Federal Parliament.

Mohamud indicated that he nominated Sharmarke both on his own volition and at the recommendation of local and international partners. He also commended Sharmarke for strengthening diplomatic ties between the Somali and U.S. governments during his brief tenure as Somalia's Ambassador to the United States. In his acceptance speech, Sharmarke pledged to form a broad-based Cabinet and work towards meeting the goals enshrined in Vision 2016. The regional Puntland and Jubaland administrations, as well as the AU Special Representative for Somalia and the Ambassador of Germany to Somalia all issued press statements welcoming his appointment.

On 24 December, the national legislature approved Sharmarke's nomination. According to Federal Parliament Speaker Mohamed Osman Jawari, of the 224 MPs present at the parliamentary session, 218 voted in favor of the appointment, none rejected it or abstained, and six left the hall. The UN Secretary-General Ban Ki-moon, European Union, and US government all welcomed the endorsement and reaffirmed their support for the Somali authorities. On 25 December, Sharmarke officially took office at a handover ceremony in Villa Somalia attended by President Mohamud, outgoing cabinet ministers, and legislators, among other guests. Former prime minister Abdiweli Sheikh Ahmed therein urged the new administration and legislature to work together to implement the tasks within Vision 2016. Sharmarke and Mohamud in turn lauded Ahmed's administration, and noted its various achievements in terms of domestic and foreign policy.

==== Cabinet ====
On 12 January 2015, Sharmarke announced his new Federal Cabinet, consisting of 26 ministers, 25 deputy ministers, and 8 state ministers. Many ministers were retained from the previous Ahmed administration. Sharmarke indicated that he selected the new Council of Ministers after intensive consultations with local stakeholders, with the aim of balancing the public interest with governmental continuation and administrative priorities. On 17 January 2015, Prime Minister Sharmarke dissolved his newly nominated cabinet due to vehement opposition by legislators, who rejected the reappointment of certain former ministers. At Sharmarke's behest, the Federal Parliament concurrently granted him a time extension to engage in further consultations before he was to select a new Council of Ministers. On 27 January 2015, Sharmarke appointed a new, smaller 20 minister Cabinet. UN Special Representative for Somalia Nicholas Kay and US Special Representative for Somalia James P. McAnulty both welcomed the new appointments, emphasized the importance of working towards the Vision 2016 political benchmarks, and reaffirmed their continued support for the Somali federal government. On 31 January, the Federal Parliament granted Sharmarke an additional 10 days to finalize his cabinet before deliberation. 139 MPs voted in favour of the time extension, 47 rejected it, and 4 abstained.

On 6 February, Sharmarke finalized his cabinet, consisting of 26 ministers, 14 state ministers, and 26 deputy ministers. Federal legislators later approved the new Council of Ministers on 9 February, with 191 voting in favor it, 22 against it, and none abstaining. The UN, AU, EU, IGAD and US and UK governments all applauded the announcement, and reemphasized the importance of working toward the Vision 2016 benchmarks.

==== Somalia-UAE bilateral cooperation ====
In January 2015, Prime Minister Sharmarke met with the United Arab Emirates Ambassador to Somalia Mohammed Ahmed Othman Al Hammadi at his Mogadishu office. The officials touched on various matters of bilateral interest, including military operations, governmental re-institutionalization, maritime security, and the local reconstruction process. Sharmarke noted the longstanding and close relationship between the territories of Somalia and the UAE. Ambassador Al Hammadi in turn pledged that the Emirati authorities would support the ongoing developmental activities in Somalia. The meeting was among several that Sharmarke held during the week, including gatherings with the Ambassadors of China, the United States, United Kingdom and Sweden, and with Special Envoys from the UN and AU.

In April 2015, Sharmarke met again in Mogadishu with the UAE Ambassador to Somalia Al Hammadi. The two officials discussed various bilateral matters, with Sharmarke commending the Emirati government for its socioeconomic development cooperation in Somalia. Al Hammadi in turn thanked Sharmarke for his efforts at strengthening ties between both nations.

==== Somalia-Ethiopia bilateral cooperation ====
In March 2015, Sharmarke met with the Prime Minister of Ethiopia Hailemariam Desalegn at his office in Addis Ababa. The two Premiers touched on various issues of bilateral interest. Sharmarke and his federal delegation subsequently conferred with Foreign Minister of Ethiopia Tedros Adhanom. The officials discussed politics, security and cooperation, among other bilateral matters. Additionally, Sharmarke was slated to meet with other continental leaders on behalf of the Federal Government of Somalia.

==== Ministerial priorities workshop ====
In March 2015, Sharmarke organized a two-day workshop for all of the federal government's ministries. The initiative harmonizes and coordinates government functions with the aim of meeting the Vision 2016 roadmap's political, security, reconciliation and economic benchmarks. According to the Prime Minister, the workshop's goals constitute a social contract between the government and its citizenry, inaugurating a new ethos of administrative planning, cooperation and accountability.

==== Somalia-Qatar bilateral cooperation ====
In March 2015, Sharmarke held bilateral talks in Doha with the Prime Minister of Qatar, Abdullah bin Nasser bin Khalifa Al Thani. The Federal Government of Somalia delegation included Minister of Foreign Affairs Abdisalam Omer, Minister of Planning and International Cooperation Abdirahman Yusuf Hussein Aynte, Minister of Health Hawo Hassan Mohamed, Minister of Transport and Aviation Ali Ahmed Jama Jangali and Ambassador of Somalia to Qatar Omar Idris. The gathering focused on strengthening investment, commerce and governance ties between both territories, with an emphasis on stabilization initiatives. It concluded with a signed cooperative agreement in the civil aviation and education sectors. According to Sharmarke, the treaty aims to accelerate the ongoing reconstruction and development process in Somalia and to buttress local job creation. Among the agreement's stipulations, Qatar Airways is scheduled to begin making flights to the Aden Adde International Airport in Mogadishu.

==== Anti-terrorism law ====
In April 2015, Sharmarke chaired a Federal Cabinet meeting to discuss a new anti-terrorism law, which had been formulated by the Ministry of National Security. The bill aims to empower the national security agencies to efficaciously handle anti-peace elements. The Council of Ministers subsequently endorsed the new law. It is now slated for deliberation and approval in the Federal Parliament.

==== Diplomatic reshuffle ====
In April 2015, Sharmarke chaired a Federal Cabinet meeting wherein new diplomatic appointments were announced. The decision was reached at the recommendation of the Ministry of Foreign Affairs led by Minister Abdisalam Omer, which suggested reshuffling the ambassadorial positions. Among the newly assigned officials were former Information Minister Dahir Mohamed Geele as Ambassador of Somalia to Saudi Arabia, senior Washington embassy-based diplomat Jamal Mohamed Hassan as Ambassador of Somalia to Kenya, and Jamal Mohamed Barrow as Ambassador of Somalia to South Africa. Fatuma Abdullahi Insaniya was also appointed Ambassador of Somalia to the United States, the first woman to hold the office, while Khadija Mohamed retained her position as Ambassador of Somalia to Iraq. The Council of Ministers also indicated that the government was slated to refurbish its embassy in France, and to reopen its embassies in Germany, Malaysia and Burundi.

==== Special Task Force on Remittances ====
In April 2015, Prime Minister Sharmarke and President Mohamud in conjunction with the Federal Cabinet officially launched the Special Task Force on Remittances (STFR). The multi-agency initiative is mandated with facilitating the Federal Government of Somalia's new national policy pertaining to the money transfer industry. Its main priority is centered on establishing a comprehensive strategy and a consultative implementation plan for the formalization of the local financial sector. Additionally, the STFR is tasked with helping to foster a business environment and financial infrastructure conducive to growth. It is also empowered to coordinate and speed up the endorsement of financial governance instruments and transparency associated legislation, such as the laws on Anti-Money Laundering (AML) and Counter Financing of Terrorism (CFT). In accordance with the Financial Action Task Force (FATF)'s recommendations, the STFR is in turn slated to oversee the Somali federal government's campaign to ratify various international treaties. The Task Forces' membership is scheduled to be announced shortly, and will be drawn from government institutions, the remittance industry, banks and other key private sector stakeholders.

==== Federal-Puntland forum ====
In April 2015, Prime Minister Sharmarke and President of the autonomous Puntland region Abdiweli Mohamed Ali launched a consultative forum between the Federal Government and Puntland at the regional state's administrative capital, Garowe. Various federal and Puntland delegates were in attendance at the gathering, including Federal Minister of Planning and international cooperation Abdirahman Yusuf Hussein Aynte, Puntland Minister of Education Ali Haji Warsame and Puntland Minister of Information Abdiweli Indha-Guran. The round-table meeting centered on Federal-Puntland bilateral cooperation, as well as the scheduled 2016 national elections. Among the main areas discussed within the Framework for Action were the ongoing federalization process, the implementation of previous treaties, the constitutional review process, border demarcation, resource-sharing, the integration of troops from different regions into the national army, and the establishment of a new Central State. The forum concluded with a signed agreement, which stipulates that Puntland will contribute 3,000 troops to the Somali National Army.

==== Somalia-Sweden bilateral cooperation ====
In April 2015, Sharmarke met with Ambassador of Sweden to Somalia Mikael Lindvall in Mogadishu. The officials discussed various bilateral matters, with Sharmarke commending the Swedish government for its commitment to the state-building and development process in Somalia. He also noted that diplomatic ties between both nations date to the independence period in the 1960s, and remarked on the remittances sent to Somalia by Somali expatriates as well as Sweden's traditional respect for other cultures and religions.

==== Somalia-United States bilateral cooperation ====
On 5 May 2015, Sharmarke, President Hassan Sheikh Mohamud and other senior government officials met with US Secretary of State John Kerry at the Aden Adde International Airport in Mogadishu. Security in the capital was tightened ahead of the state visit, and roads connecting to the airport were cordoned off. The bilateral meeting was the first ever visit to Somalia by an incumbent US Secretary of State. It served as a symbol of the ameliorated political and security situation in the country. The officials focused on the benchmarks enshrined within Somalia's Vision 2016 political roadmap, as well as cooperation in the security sector. Additionally, Kerry conferred with the presidents of the Puntland, South West State and Jubaland regional states, as well as some government ministers. He also met with civil society leaders and AMISOM representatives. Kerry was likewise expected to commit further assistance toward the local reconstruction and development process.

==== Taxation policy ====
In May 2015, Sharmarke announced that his administration was developing a new nationwide taxation policy. According to the Prime Minister, the initiative aims to increase government income and further buttress the commercial sector. It is part of a broader socioeconomic stimulus plan, which will be centered on comprehensive feasibility and goal-oriented analysis. The new taxation bill is scheduled to be put before parliament for deliberation. Additionally, Sharmarke indicated that his administration would seek to attract direct foreign investments.

==== Somalia-Qatar bilateral cooperation ====
In May 2015, Prime Minister Sharmarke, President Hassan Sheikh Mohamud and Foreign Affairs Minister Abdisalam Omer met in Villa Somalia in Mogadishu with a visiting Qatari government delegation led by the Foreign Affairs Minister of Qatar, Khalid bin Mohammad Al Attiyah. The officials touched on various bilateral matters, including the security and educational sectors as well as the Houthi insurgency in Yemen. Additionally, Al Attiyah reaffirmed his administration's support for the Somali government's reconstruction efforts. He also indicated that the Qatari government would invest in Somalia given the nation's abundant natural resources and other investment opportunities. Omer in turn commended the Qatari leadership for its support of security and stabilization initiatives in Somalia.

Political offices
Preceded by Nur Hassan Hussein	Prime Minister of Somalia; 2009–2010	Succeeded by Abdiwahid Elmi Gonjeh; Acting
Preceded by Abdiweli Sheikh Ahmed	Prime Minister of Somalia; 2014–2017	Succeeded by Hassan Ali Khaire
