= Geledi =

Somali clan

Geledi رير غلدي
- Digil Somali Clan
- Ethnicity: Somali
- Location: Somalia
- Parent tribe: Digil
- Language: Somali
- Religion: Sunni Islam

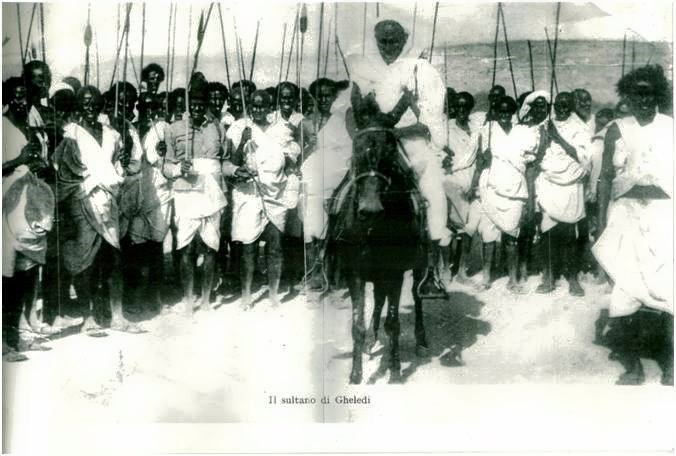
Sultan Osman Ahmed (mounted) and his soldiers

The Geledi are a Somali clan that live predominantly in the environs of Afgooye city. They are a sub-clan of the Digil and led the Geledi Sultanate during the late 17th to early 20th century. They are divided into two main lineage groups: the Tolweyne and the Yabadhaale.

== History ==
=== Origins ===
The nobles within the Geledi claim descent from Omar al-Dinle omar yusuf daraod(Abadir) who arrived from Harar. He had 3 other brothers, Fakhr and with 2 others of whom their names are given differently as Shams, Umudi, Alahi and Ahmed. Together they were known as Afarta Timid, 'the 4 who came', indicating their origins from Arabia. However the Geledi people like the other Rahanweyn are of true Somali stock and like the Darod and Isaaq claiming Arab lineage was a phenomenon. Aw Kalafow a descendant of Omar is stated to be the first to use the title Garad.

=== Ajuran Sultanate ===
The Geledi and their Wacdaan allies were under the rule of the Ajuran client Silcis. The grandfather of Ibrahim Adeer was Geledi (clan) general who inflicted a large defeat on invading Oromo at Lafagaale. Following the weakening of the Ajuran the two notable rebellions came from the Geledi and Hiraab with Ibrahim Adeer carving out his own sultanate and defeating the Silcis.

=== Geledi Sultanate ===
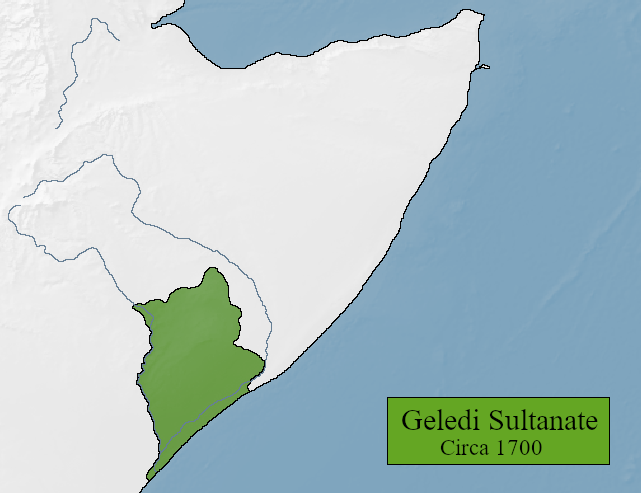

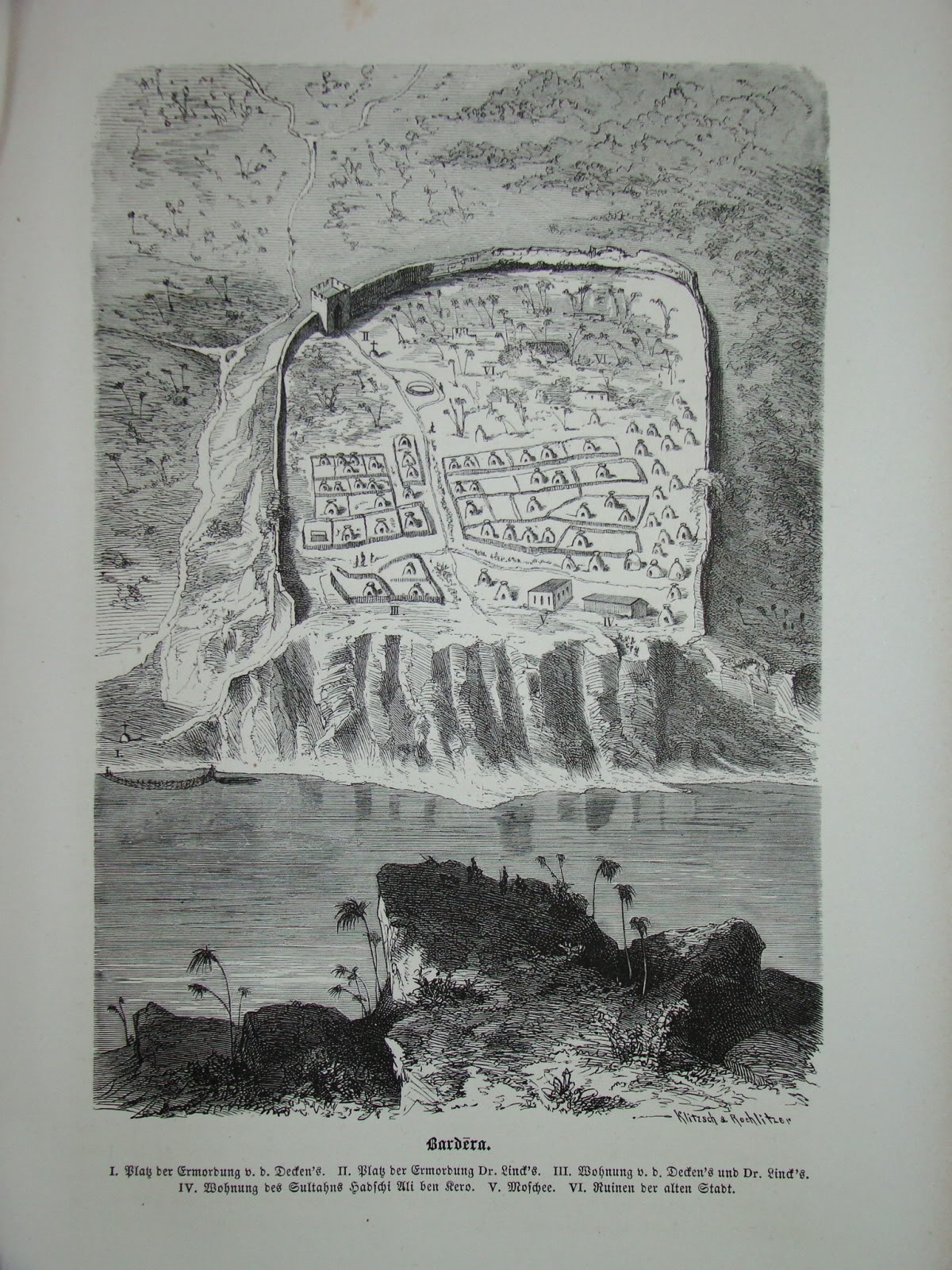
View of the Bardera Citadel in the mid 1800s by Baron Karl Klaus von der Decken.

The new Geledi Sultanate rose to become a powerful state that ruled large parts of the Horn of Africa exerting heavy influence on the Banaadir coast and dominating trade on the Jubba and Shabelle rivers. The sultanate grew to encompass nearly all of the Rahanweyn under the reign of Mahamud Ibrahim reaching its apex under Yusuf Mahamud Ibrahim. The sultanate conducted foreign policy with neighbors on the Swahili Coast and was connected with rulers of southern Arabia. Facing two jihadist insurrections the state was able to defeat and resubjugate lost territory on its western frontier as a result of these wars. Ultimately failing to end a rebellion in the key city of Merca the sultanate declined steadily but still managed to fend off the Ethiopian Empire before the death of its last final ruler Osman Ahmed.

=== Geledi-Bimaal conflict ===
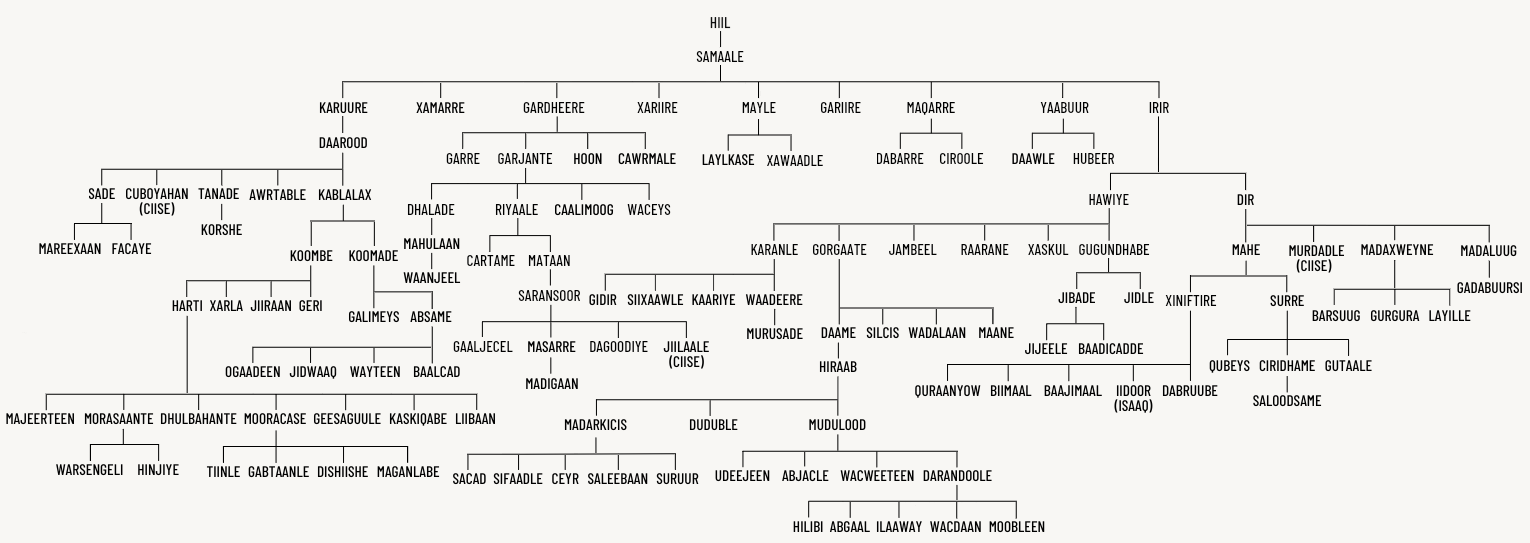
Genealogical tree of Somali clans

The first documented conflict between the Geledi and Bimaal Somali clans would be the Battle of Adaddey Suleyman. After geledi sultan Yusuf Mahamud Ibrahim won a battle at the island of siyu over the Salafi Somalis led by Haji Ali Majeerteen, the Witu Sultan would send aid to sultan Yusuf before he departed to meet the Bimaal rebels, who refused to join his battles against the Salafist Somalis in Bardera, and even allied them in Mungiya. The two forces finally would clash at Adadday Suleyman in 1848, a village near Merca. The Bimaal defended themselves, and after three days of fierce warring, Sultan Yusuf Mahamud and his brother were killed, and ultimately lost against the Omani aligned Bimaal rebels in 1848.

Years later, in 1878, sultan Yusuf's son;Ahmed Yusuf Mahamud made preparations to finally defeat the Bimal, as his father failed to. Ahmed's brother Abobokur Yusuf warned him, not to go through with the attack as the Geledi had an influential ally refuse to join the upcoming campaign. Sultan Ahmed, Reprimanding his brother, said he could watch the women & children then. Abobokur eventually deciding to accompany his brother, the Geledi marched out to meet the Bimaal at Cagaaran near Merca. The two forces would enter a fierce engagement, the Geledi initially tiding the battle in their favor, however, the Geledi would eventually lose to the bimaals, and the Sultan's army would be routed. Killing both Sultan Ahmed and his Abobokur in battle.

Upon seeing the bodies of the dead noble men, the women of the Merca reportedly marveled at the beauty of Ahmed Yusuf and his brother, which resulted in a public uproar with them demanding a proper funeral for the late Sultan.

=== Modern ===
Following the end of the Geledi Sultanate and its incorporation into Italian Somaliland, the Somali Republic would soon be born in 1960. The Geledi people had gone from one of the most dominant subclans in all of Southern Somalia to humble farmers in the wake of illegal land grabbing and marginalization by the Somali government. Large scale movement into Afgooye by Somalis not native to the city and the grants of land traditionally reserved for Geledi cultivation caused significant tension in the community.

== Culture ==
Charles Guillain's caravan expedition in 1848, meeting members of the Geledi clan, departing from Mogadishu.

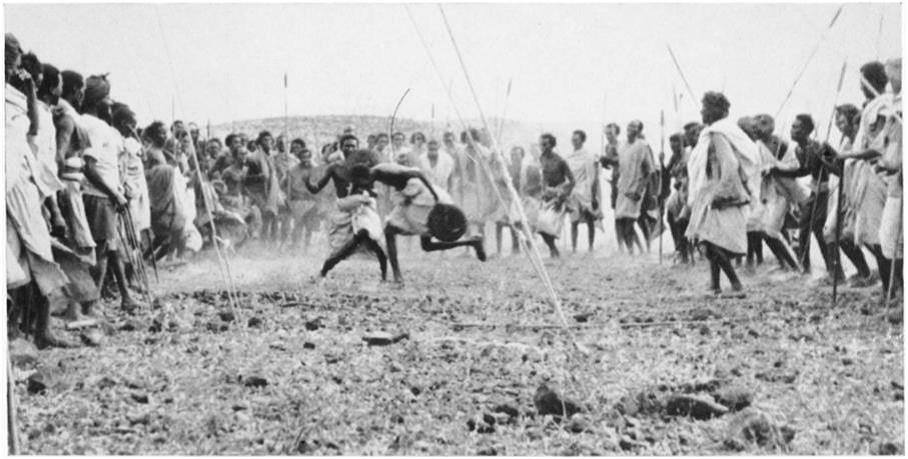
An example of Somalis engaging in mock combat

New Years celebrations in the town of Afgooye are well marked by the Geledi people and they continue until this day. With men and women donning traditional white cloth a man wielding a wooden trumpet or buun leads the people in procession. They are marked in certain lines behind the trumpeter and poets lead chants and people break into song. Like other Rahanweyn the Geledi speak the maay dialect but their close proximity to maaxa or standard Somali speakers has marked them.

=== Istunka Afgooye ===
The Istunka Afgooye or isgaraac is an annual stick fight performed in the city by its inhabitants stretching back hundreds of years. It first began in the Ajuran period but was later formalized with teams and rules by Geledi Sultan Ahmed Yusuf. The festival coincides with the harvest being a joyous time in the city The event itself consists of a mock fight between the people residing on each side of the river bed in the town of Afgooye. Symbolizing the defence of one's community and honor, it coincides with the start of the main harvest season. Istunka was originally performed in full combat gear, with battle-axes, swords and daggers. However, for safety reasons, performers later replaced those weapons with large sticks or batons.

=== Poetry ===
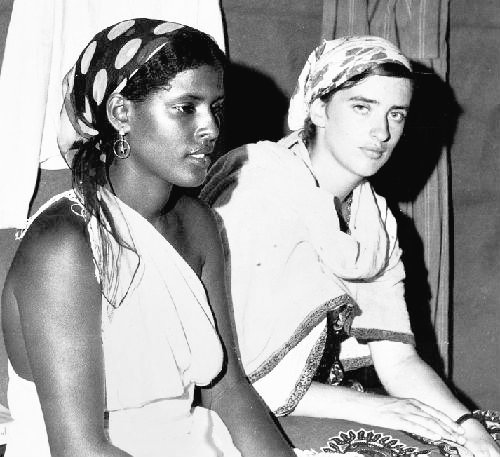
British ethnologist Virginia Luling in 1967

The Geledi retained their rich oral tradition and evocative poetry that differed from the more well known northern style. In southern Somalia the poet and reciter would be one and the same. British ethnologist Virginia Luling noted during her visit to the town that poetry was to be conceived and recited simultaneously with no prior preparation. The poets or Laashin relied on their wit and memory to construct beautiful poems and entertain the audience. As the Geledi are Rahanweyn, they speak Af Maay and not Af Maaha which is sometimes classified as a separate language from Af Maaha or the ubiquitously known 'Standard Somali'.

Geledi Laashins during Luling's 1989 stay in Afgooye sang about the ever present issue of land theft by the Somali government. The Sultan in these poems was asked to help the community and reminded of his legendary Gobroon forefathers of the centuries prior.

The poem The law then was not this law was performed by the leading Laashins of Afgooye, Hiraabey, Muuse Cusmaan and Abukar Cali Goitow alongside a few others, addressed to the current leader Sultan Subuge.

Here the richest selection of the poem performed by Goitow

Ganaane gubow gaala guuriow Gooble maahinoo Geelidle ma goynin
Gembi iyo waran guraantiis aa loogu soo gayooday, Gooble
Gacalkiisa guri curad aa looga soo guuray Haddana nin walba aa
Soo gamgamohaayo, goofka beereed waa la goostay, gelgeshii
Gaashada daaqeysana waa la goostay, gunta intee la geyn doonaa?
Gobroontii soo gaartay Gobroontaan ma ahayn, gargooye Ibraahim
Cumar Xaaji goodaalka adunyada markii joogeen, Awow Gaduud Cali -
Mahinoo - Awow Gaduud Cali Abukar, Yusuf Maxamuud iyo goodaalka
Addunka markii joogeen, ganuunka ganuunkan ma ahayn, Awow
Gudgudoome Cumar Adeerow goodaalka aduunka markii joogeen
Ganuunka ganuunkan ma ahayn. Beereed waa la goostay, gelgeshii
Gaasha la la goostay, gaasha intee loola guuraa ?

Ganaane gubowow, gaala guuriow-aa
Gelgeshii la goostay go'aan maad ka gaart-aa (gaartay) ?

— Abubakr Cali Goitow The law then was not this law
Translation:

You who burnt Ganaane and chased away the disbelievers
Did you not separate from the Geelidle and come to Gooble (Afgooye)?
We endured war and the point of the spear
For the love of Gooble we left our first home
And now everyone crowds in here, they have taken our cleared farmland
They have taken the pasture where the herds grazed - where will the people be led ?
The Gobroon who first arrived here are not these Gobroon
When the giver of judgment Ibraahim Cumar Xaaji the pillar of the world was alive and Aw Gaduud Cali
Is it not so ? - Aw Gaduud Cali Abukar, and Yusuf Maxamuud the pillar of the world
While they were alive the law was not this law
When the giver of decisions Aw Cumar Adeerow was in the world the law was not this law
Now everyone crowds in, they have taken the cleared farmland,
They have taken the pasture of the herds where will we move the herds?

You who burnt Ganaane and chased away the infidels
Have you reached a decision about the stolen pastures?
