= Geledi–Zanzibar conflicts =

Date	1868–1870
Location	Kismayo, Barawa and surrounding areas
Result	Stalemate

Belligerents
Barawa leaders Geledi Sultanate	Majeerteen leaders Zanzibar Sultanate

Commanders and leaders
Ahmed Yusuf	Barghash bin Said of Zanzibar

Units involved
Unknown	300 soldiers

Geledi–Zanzibar conflicts (1868-1870) refers to a series of military encounters in southern Somalia between 1868 and 1870, in Kismayo and Barawa. The conflict arose from the arrival of Majeerteen tribes along the southern Somali coast and their clashes with local communities and the Geledi Sultanate. Ahmed Yusuf of Geledi became involved in the conflict alongside the people of Barawa, while the Majeerteen were supported by the Sultanate of Zanzibar.

== Background ==
By the late 1860s, Majeerteen Somalis from the region west of Cape Guardafui began moving towards Kismayo. They were joined by other Majeerteen tribes travelling overland, allowing them to establish a strong presence to challenge the existing communities in and around Kismayo.

== The Battle of Barawa ==
The first major confrontation outside Kismayo occurred when the newly established Majeerteen force moved against the Somali inhabitants of Barawa In July 1870.

The Majeerteen forces that had come to Kismayo became strong enough to overcome Barawa. The Majeerteen defeated the Barawan forces which forced the Barawans to request military support from Ahmed Yusuf.

The Barawans allied with Ahmed Yusuf, the sultan of the Geledi Sultanate, and with Geledi assistance, the Majeerteen were pushed back towards the fortified settlement of Kismayo. The Majeerteen were driven back onto the stone fort at Kismayo. The majeerteen were halted and driven back from Barawa after their first initial success.

== Zanzibar intervention in Kismayo ==
in 1870 the Majeerteen at Kismayo were reinforced by Zanzibari soldiers belonging to the liwali of Lamu. After Ahmed Yusuf's forces had driven the Majeerteen back onto the stone fort at Kismayo. Zanzibari troops were sent by the governor of Lamu to reinforce the Majeerteen. Lamu was under the authority of the Zanzibar sultanate.

The stone fort of Kismayo became the main defensive position of the Majeerteen. The arrival of Lamu troops enabled the Majeerteen to retain their position at Kismayo. the combined Barawan- Geledi forces withdrew after the Majeerteen received reinforcement from Lamu.

== Legacy ==
The conflicts were significant because it marked an expansion of Zanzibari political and military involvement in the southern Somali coast through the Lamu administration, with The reinforcement of the Majeerteen by Lamu troops the Zanzibaris would extend their influence in Kismayo.

== See also ==
- Jubba River
- History of Somalia

== Bibliography ==
- Ylvisaker, Marguerite H. (1979). Lamu in the Nineteenth Century: Land, Trade, and Politics. African Research Studies. Boston: African Studies Center, Boston University.
- Kirk, John (12 July 1870). Dr. Kirk to Earl Granville. Class B. East Coast of Africa. Correspondence respecting the Slave Trade and other Matters (Report). Zanzibar: British Parliamentary Papers. pp. 474–475. FO 84/1325.
- Cassanelli, Lee V. (1982). The Shaping of Somali Society: Reconstructing the History of a Pastoral People, 1600–1900. Philadelphia: University of Pennsylvania Press.
