= Yusuf Mahamud Ibrahim =

Sultan of the Geledi (r. 1798–1848)

Yusuf Mahamud Ibrahim Gobroon يوسف محمود ابراهيم

Sultan of the Geledi
- Reign: 1798–1848
- Predecessor: Mahamud Ibrahim
- Successor: Ahmed Yusuf Mahamud
- Born: Afgooye, Sultanate of the Geledi (now Somalia)
- Died: 1848; Addadey Suleyman
- Dynasty: Gobroon dynasty
- Religion: Islam

Yusuf Mahamud Ibrahim (Somali: Yuusuf Maxamuud Ibrahiim, Arabic: يوسف محمود ابراهيم; died 1848) was a Somali ruler. He was the third and most powerful Sultan of the Geledi sultanate, reigning from 1798 to 1848. Under the reign of Sultan Yusuf, his kingdom entered its apex, he managed to modernize his economy and his kingdom quickly became one of the wealthiest states in East Africa. Yusuf frequently toured the sultanate and built rapport with his many clients and allies. He successfully consolidated Geledi power during conquest of Bardera and expelling extremist ideology from his region. It was under his rule he manage to establish many trading partners and allies such as the Sultanate of Witu. He also exacted tribute from Sultan Said of the Omani Empire starting from 1843.

== Early life ==
Yusuf was the son of Sultan Mahamud Ibrahim and as a youth was sent to Barawa to study Islam. Barawa was a renowned hub of the Qadiriyya sufi tariqa in East Africa and it was traditional practice for Geledi leaders to send their sons to the city.

== Reign ==
Yusuf's rule marked the start of the golden age of the Geledi and was the most powerful ruler of the Sultanate. Well versed in knowledge of Islam and a skilled warrior his Sultanate covered all Digil and Mirifle territories of Somalia. The state constituted the 'Geledi Confederacy', also incorporating other Somalis such as the Bimaal, Sheekhaal, and Wacdaan who were not Digil or Mirifle. Yusuf Mahamud promoted a policy of indirect administration to manage such a diverse territory allowing the local Malaks, Islaws (tribal chiefs), Imams, Sheikhs (religious figures), and Akhiyaars (notable elders) of the community to play significant roles in the administration of the Sultanate. Not only the political head of the Sultanate, but also was portrayed as the religious leader. The Sultanate during his reign was very prosperous economically and politically. Afgooye, the capital of the Sultanate, was the meeting point of the caravan routes in southern Somalia. Afgooye had some thriving industries such as weaving, shoemaking, tableware, jewellery, and pottery. It was also the center for the annual Istunka festival, which marked the new and remains a tourist attraction in Afgooye today.

== Relations with the Swahili Sultanate of Witu ==
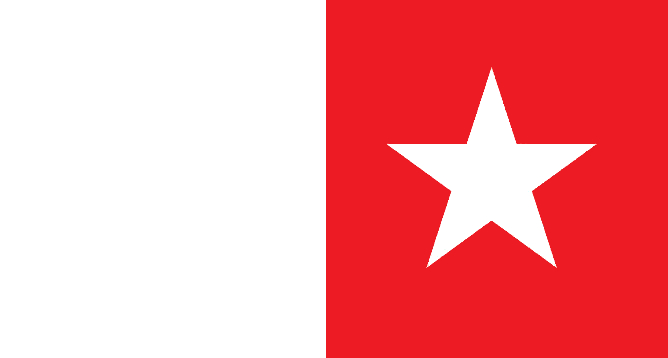
Flag of the Witu Sultanate

The Sultanate of Witu was a kingdom based in Witu near Lamu. Its rulers had strong ties with Sultan Yusuf as they both were mutually antagonistic towards Zanzibar and had shared commercial interests. On the island of Siyu the Sultan of Witu Bwana Mataka had been faced with an insurrection and was deposed in the 1820s. The defiant islanders alongside some Somalis who were more loyal to the prior administration called for Omani aid. Yusuf would intervene and Witu would prove victorious as it would bring the Sultan to engage a newly emerging militant group in Bardera which was a key trade hub and where the Siyu Somalis drew their strength. Both states were interested in ivory trade through the Jubba river continuing to flourish as a great source of revenue for the region. Later following their victory at Siyu over the Salafi Somalis the Witu Sultan sent aid before Yusuf engaged and ultimately lost against the Omani aligned Bimaals in 1848 at the Battle of Adaddey Suleyman.

== Conquest of Bardera ==
Bardera was a city part of Geledi Sultanate but eventually, the governor of Bardera was overthrown by an extremist group called the Jama'a. The Jama'a group was founded in 1819 by Sheikh Ibrahim Yabarow, introducing some reforms such as outlawing tobacco and popular dancing and prohibiting the ivory trade. The Jama'a began to implement some elements of Islamic Sharia such as the wearing of decent Islamic dress for women. In the mid-1830s, after receiving strong adherents among new pastoral immigrants from the Darod tribes who migrated from the Ogaden region had settled onto the upper Jubba valley and taken control over the agricultural settlements there, including the major center of trade, Luuq, which happened to be the most important trading place between Kismayo and Harar. In the late 1830s, the Jama'a had grown to almost 20 thousand professional soldiers and from 1836 armed detachment of the jama'a started to raid villages in the region and force people to perform the daily prayers.

By 1840, the Jama'a opened a rebellion against the Geledi Sultanate and the Jama'a warriors reached Baidoa and sacked Barawa an important port for Geledi Sultanate and the historic seat of the Qadirriyah order where Sultan Yusuf Mahamud and Sultan Mahamud Ibrahim had studied. The quick expansion of the Jama'a triggered the formation of a coalition of opponents in the region. Geledi Sultanate resented the embargo imposed by the Jama'a on long-distance trade through Luuq, as well as the destabilization of agricultural activities in the Jubba and Shabelle valleys. Runaway slaves who had fled to the Sultanate of Witu and formed a community near Bardera were despised by the Jama'a leaders. This action provoked a concerted response from the clans of the inter-river areas under the charismatic leadership of the Geledi Sultan, Yusuf Muhamud and drew the ire of the Sultan of Witu Bwana Mataka whose state was suffering due to the ivory trade disruption. In 1843, the Geledi Sultanate mobilized an expedition force of 40'000, mostly of Digil warriors under the leadership of the Sultan of Geledi, Yusuf Mahamud and defeated the forces of Jama'a, mostly Darod warriors led by Shaikh Abd Al-Rahman and Shaikh Ibrahim, and the citadel of Bardera was besieged and then burned to the ground. The leaders of the Jama'a were captured and killed, and the immigrant Darod nomads were expelled from the Upper Jubba region, and trade through Luuq reopened. The cities of Geledi Sultanate such as Barawa and Baidoa quickly recovered from the attack and Bardera came under Geledi Sultanate rule once again and the city eventually re-built its status. After his victory over the Jama'a of Bardhera, Sultan Yusuf Muhamud became the paramount political leader in the region after restoring stability in the region and revitalized the East African ivory trade.

== Influence in Mogadishu ==
The Geledi and the Omani Empire vied over who would be the superior power on the Benadir Coast, with Yusuf ultimately being the dominant force with the Omanis having a nominal presence and being forced to pay tribute to him. Mogadishu under Abgaal control had been in a period of decline and disarray near the end of the Hiraab Imamate although trade remained significant. French explorer Charles Guillain arrived in 1846 and visited the Banadir coast and stayed mainly in Mogadishu. He noted the strife and that the Shingani quarter of the city was tense due to two murders committed there and a state of war was present between the Shingani and Hamarweyn quarter. Hiraab Imam Ahmed was the ruler of the city and Guillain delivered a message to him from Said bin Sultan of Oman. Sultan Said paid tribute to Yusuf in order to have the right to have Omani commercial representatives stay in Mogadishu. Imam Ahmed was struggling with a pretender who had a support base in Hamarweyn and was the cause of the unrest and violence. To end this chaos in Mogadishu, Sultan Yusuf marched into the city with an 8,000 strong army breaking the stalemate & ruled in favour of Imam Ahmed in Shingani, with the pretender fleeing the city. Yusuf selected a relative of the pretender to lead the Hamarweyn quarter and this ended the dispute. Yusuf is even referred to as the Governor of Mogadishu in some sources, highlighting the power he exerted over the city.

Guillain tried and ultimately failed to arrange an audience with Yusuf himself who was not at Afgooye at the time, but he corresponded with his brother Haji Ibrahim through an influential Bravanese merchant named Sid-Qoullatin. Ibrahim himself was not at Afgooye but Bardera and replied to his friend Sid inquiring the true meaning why Guillain would want to meet Yusuf. Guillain did receive a document detailing the lineage of Yusuf back fifteen generations to Gobroon the patriarch of the ruling dynasty of the Geledi.

Now, O Sid-Qoullatin, do not deceive me on account of the Ferenji [Guillain and his party], and serve as my other self. You were in Mogadishu at their arrival, while I am far away in Bardheere. Today, do not deceive me. I will wait for what you have to say. Inform yourself of their secret purposes. Fear God, your master. Search out their secrets, and write me a letter and give it to my nephew Hasan-ben-Ali ... Be sure the Ferenji do not set out [for Afgooye] before having received a letter from me ... You know the phrase do not deceive those who put their confidence in you'. Now I have placed my confidence in you; don't deceive me. The briefest words and the clearest words are the best.

Your friend Haji Ibrahim

== Battle of Mungiya ==
The second extremist group Sultan Yusuf Mahamud confronted was Haji Ali Majeerteen belonging to the Majerteen tribe (1787–1852) who arrived in Merca in 1846. Sheikh Ali Abdirahman was born in Nugaal during Majerteen Sultanate period. He travelled to Mecca and Baghdad for further studies where he met and studied with the disciplines of Muhammad Abdulwahhab and returned to Majerteenia. He established an Islamic education center at Haalin wells near Taleex in Nugaal Valley. However, he emigrated from his home after getting into conflict with his clan and moved to the eastern region under the tutelage of Majerteen Sultan Nur Osman. Here also, Sheikh Ali found it unacceptable to live with the overt violation of Islamic Sharia by the Sultan Nur of Majerteen and formed an alliance with Haji Farah Hirsi, a pretender Sultan of the Majerteen. Haji Farah attempted to establish a new dynasty to overthrow his cousin. Under the arrangement of Sheikh Ali and Haji Farah, Haji Farah would take political responsibility and Sheikh Ali would administer religious affairs but their plot was foiled.

Following the unsuccessful overthrow of Sultan Nur Osman, the Sheikh was then exiled from Majerteen Sultanate. He travelled to India and then Zanzibar and remained there for 15 months under the custody of Said Bin Sultan (the father of Sayyid Barghash). Planning to establish an Islamic Emirate, Sheikh Ali arrived in Merca in 1847 with five boats, 150 followers, substantial quantities of firearms and ammunitions estimated to be 40 rifles and 4 cannons just four years after the defeat of Bardera Jama'a by the dominant Geledi Sultanate that ruled over vast territories of the southern Somali regions. However, the Bimaal clan, the major clan of Merca was rebelling against the Geledi Sultanate and had refused to participate in the Bardera campaign a few years prior. Sheikh Ali arrived in Merca in alliance with the Bimaal clan. He settled in the area near Merca with the consent of the Bimaal clan and began his activities and education programs. It is established that Sheikh Ali had secret plans for himself to form a colony at the port of Mungiya (the point where Shabelle River was closest to the Indian Ocean coast), and had obtained permission from Sultan Yusuf of Geledi. However, initially, he attempted to play the role of a peacemaker between Sultan Yusuf of Geledi and the Bimaal clan and sent a letter to Sultan Yusuf requesting that he accepts his reconciliation proposal. However, when Sultan Yusuf refused his offer disrespected that a newcomer would dare interfere with his internal affairs. Sheikh Ali was furious and declared war against him and his men raided a string villages near Afgooye. Yusuf and the Geledi army confronted Sheikh Ali's well-armed followers which were mainly from the Majerteen tribe and annihilated them. Mungiya was burnt to the ground and the threat to the sultanate ended.

The doctrine of Sheikh Ali is evident in the letter he sent to the people of Barawa prior to the battle, showing that he considered the Geledi Sultanate a polity led by a kafir. Following his defeat, Sheikh Ali stated that "in reality, our [death] and if you are among the deviated sect which Sultan Yusuf leads, there is no relation between us, and your blood will not be saved from us." The hardline stance of Sheikh Ali, to the propagation of Islam among his people, his mobilization of armed followers, and his siding with the Bimaal clan against Geledi Sultanate all indicates that he belonged to a militant ideology akin to the Bardera Jama, new militant tendencies that were emerging across the Muslim world at the time.

== Conquest of Merca & Battle of Adaddey Suleyman ==
The Bimaal clan were once part of the Geledi Sultanate and Merca served as an important port for the kingdom. They reasserted their independence after refusing to join Yusuf's prior campaigns (Bardera) and even allied against him at Mungiya. Sultan Yusuf was incensed by their hostility and sought to reincorporate their territory as he had in Bardera and Mungiya prior realizing that the Bimaal constituted a major threat to his Sultanate. In 1847 Yusuf's army stormed Merca, overpowering its defenses and the inhabitants would surrender. Despite the capture of the city, most of the Bimaal were located outside of the Merca and in May of the following year, he resolved to eliminate the remaining resistance. Departing to meet the Bimaal the two forces clashed at Adadday Suleyman in 1848, a village near Merca. The Bimaal defended themselves and, after three days of fierce attacks and counterattacks, the legendary Sultan Yusuf Mahamud and his brother were killed and the Geledi army was defeated.

Preceded by Mahamud Ibrahim	Geledi sultanate	Succeeded by Ahmed Yusuf

== See also ==
- Sultanate of Witu
- Somali aristocratic and court titles
- Mogadishu
- Merca
- Sheikh Ali
- Bimaal
- Afgooye
