= Haji Ali Majeerteen =

Influential 19th century Somali Sheikh & Poet

Hajji Abdirahman Ali عبد الرحمن علي
- Haji Ali Majeerteen writings
- Title: Sheikh

Personal life
- Born: 1787 Majerteen Sultanate
- Died: 1852 (aged 64–65)
- Era: Modern Islamic period
- Region: Majerteen Sultanate, Mecca, Zanzibar
- Main interest(s): Dawah, Jihad, Poetry

Religious life
- Religion: Islam
- Denomination: Sunni
- Jurisprudence: Shafi'i
- Creed: Athari

Muslim leader
- Influenced by: Ibn Taymiyyah, Muhammad ibn Abd al-Wahhab
- Influenced: All subsequent Salafis in Somalia

Haji Ali Abdirahman (Somali: Xaaji Cali Cabdiraxmaan), popularly known as al-Majeerteen, was a Somali Sheikh and poet.

== Biography ==
=== Early life and studies in Arabia ===
Ali Abdirahman later in his lifetime to be known as Ali Majeerteen, was born in the Nugaal Valley. His family hailed from the Reer Omar (Cumar Umad-nabi) Majeerteen sub-clan of the larger Majeerteen Harti Darod clan. He would later become one of the foremost Islamic proselytizers in Somalia.

Abdirahman first began his study of Fiqh (Islamic Jurisprudence) and Aqīdah (Creed) under Haji Yusuf bin Mohamed Al-Awrtabley of the Awrtable Darood clan, his maternal cousin. In the Manaaqib of Haji Abdirahman he mentions that it was his first teacher and Shaykh that pushed him to study in the Haram Makki and which would later lead him to go to an-Najd.

=== Return to Majerteenia ===
Upon his return home to the Majerteen Sultanate after studying in Mecca and Baghdad, Haji Ali would begin to start spreading dawah and called his people to stop certain practices that were forbidden in Islam. He started a school in Xalin and for a time would focus on his preaching. Under Majerteen Sultan Nur Osman, Haji Ali found it unacceptable to live with the overt violation of Islamic Sharia and formed an alliance with Haji Farah Hirsi, a rebel Sultan of Majerteen.

Haji Farah attempted to establish a new dynasty to overthrow his cousin. Under the arrangement of Sheikh Ali and Haji Farah, Haji Farah would take political responsibility and Sheikh Ali would administer religious affairs. Haji Farah attempted to establish a new dynasty to overthrow his cousin. Under the arrangement of Sheikh Ali and Haji Farah, Haji Farah would take political responsibility and Sheikh Ali would administer religious affairs. Nur Osman would overpower the duo and Haji Ali's emirate would be limited to the Nugaal.

According to the Journal of Lieutenant W. Christopher, dated May 8, 1843, Haji Ali Majeerteen commanded “a force of 1,500 horsemen, armed with spears and swords,” stretching from Xalin in the Sool region to Ras Mabber along the Nugaal coast.

=== Zanzibar and Mungiya Jihad ===
Haji Ali travelled to India and then Zanzibar and remained there for 15 months under the custody of Said Bin Sultan (the father of Sayyid Barghash). Planning to establish an Islamic Emirate, Sheikh Ali arrived in Merca in 1847 with five boats, 150 followers, substantial quantities of firearms and ammunitions estimated to be 40 rifles and 4 cannons just four years after the defeat of Bardera Jama'a by the Geledi Sultanate which ruled over vast territories of the southern Somali regions. At the time, the Bimaal clan who lived in Merca were rebelling against the Geledis. Haji Ali arrived in Merca and formed an alliance with the Bimaal clan. He settled in the area near Merca with the consent of the Bimaal clan and began his dawah activities and education programs. It is established that Ali had secret plans for himself to form a colony at the port of Mungiya (the point where Shabelle River was closest to the Indian Ocean coast), and had obtained permission from Sultan Yusuf of Geledi. However, initially, he attempted to play the role of a peacemaker between Sultan Yusuf and the Bimaal clan and sent a letter to Sultan Yusuf requesting him that he accepts his reconciliation proposal. Sultan Yusuf refused his offer feeling disrespected that a newcomer interfere with his internal affairs. Haji Ali was furious and declared war against the Geledi and his men raided a string villages near Afgooye. Yusuf and the Geledi army confronted Haji Ali's well armed followers which were mainly from the Majerteen tribe and annihilated them. Mungiya was burnt to the ground and Haji Ali's ambitions ended.

Haji Ali penned a letter he sent to the people of Barawa, in that he considered the Geledi Sultanate a polity adhering to a deviated sect (Firqa Al-Dalah). This deviation had to be stamped out through dawah or Jihad. Following his defeat, Sheikh Ali stated that "in reality, our [death] and if you are among the deviated sect which Sultan Yusuf leads, there is no relation between us, and your blood will not be saved from us." The hardline stance of Haji Ali, to the propagation of Islam among his people, his mobilization of armed followers, and his siding with the Bimaal clan against Geledi Sultanate displays the militant ideology akin to the Bardera Jama, the new Wahhabi tendency that was emerging across the Muslim world at the time.
