= Mahamud Ibrahim =

Sultan of the Geledi (r. mid-18th century–1798)

Mahamud Ibrahim محمود ابراهيم

Sultan of the Geledi
- Reign: mid-18th century–1798
- Predecessor: Ibrahim Adeer
- Successor: Yusuf Mahamud Ibrahim
- Dynasty: Gobroon dynasty
- Religion: Islam

Mahamud Ibrahim Adeer (Somali: Maxamuud Ibrahiim Adeer, Arabic: محمود ابراهيم) sometimes referred to as Aw Maxamuud was a Somali ruler. He was the second Sultan of the Sultanate of the Geledi. He defeated early challengers to the new Sultanate and incorporated some Rahanweyn and Hawiye subclans under Geledi rule.

== Early life ==
Mahamud was the son of the first Geledi Sultan Ibrahim Adeer. He received religious education and was conferred the honorific Aw or Sheikh, signifying his status as a learned individual.

== Reign ==
His rule marked the consolidation of the newly formed Geledi Sultanate. Echoing the battles his father fought in the decades prior it was under Mahamud's reign that the Geledi would defeat a Silcis and Gorgarte Hawiye resurgence that threatened to bring back their oppressive rule. As well, the powerful Hintire and Hubeer clans united against the Geledi but were defeated and enveloped into the Sultanate. Following his death, Mahamud's son Yusuf Mahamud Ibrahim would succeed him and take Geledi power to its greatest extent.

Preceded by Ibrahim Adeer	Geledi sultanate	Succeeded by Yusuf Mahamud Ibrahim

== See also ==
- Somali aristocratic and court titles
