= Istunka =

Festival held in Afgooye, Somalia

- Focus: Weapons
- Country of origin: Somalia
- Creator: Ajuran Sultanate; Sultanate of the Geledi
- Olympic sport: no

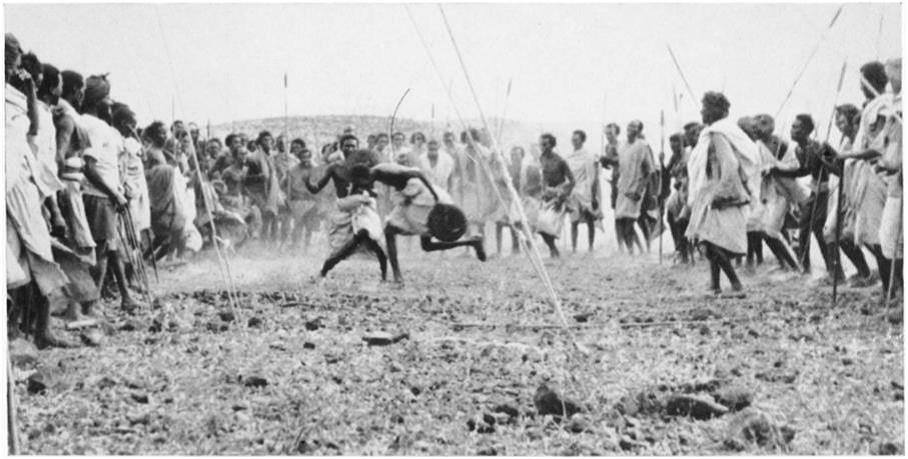
Somalis in mock combat

Istunka, also known as isgaraac, is a festival held annually in Afgooye, Somalia on the Somali New Year. The tournament was developed during the medieval Ajuran period, and was centralized in the 19th century under the Sultanate of the Geledi. Consisting of several teams engaging each other in mock combat, it is celebrated alongside other ceremonies such as Dabshiid.

== History ==
The Istunka tournament was developed in the Middle Ages, during the Ajuran period. It was celebrated annually on the Somali new year alongside other festivals such as Nowruz. The martial arts festival later became a centralized tournament under the Sultanate of the Geledi. During the reign of Sultan Ahmed Yusuf, separate teams were established, each supported by an assembly of poets, female vocalists and dance groups throughout the duration of the contest.

In the modern era, the festival evolved into a local attraction; particularly during the 1970s and 80s. It is still practiced annually in the southern Afgooye region.

== Description ==
The event itself consists of a mock fight between the people residing on each side of the river bed in the town of Afgooye. Symbolizing the defence of one's community and honor, it coincides with the start of the main harvest season. Istunka was originally performed in full combat gear, with battle-axes, swords and daggers. However, for safety reasons, performers later replaced those weapons with large sticks or batons.

== See also ==
- Culture of Somalia
- Martial arts
- Stick fighting
- Mock combat
