= Abdi Warsame Isaq =

Somali military leader (died 2011)

Abdi Warsame Isaq Cabdi Warsame Isaaq

Charmain of SSNM, Somalia

Personal details
- Born: Bakool, Somalia
- Died: 10 September 2011 London, United Kingdom
- Party: Southern Somali National Movement

Abdi Warsame Isaq (d. September 10, 2011 in London, England), or more famously known as Colonel Abdi Warsame Isaq, (Somali: Cabdi Warsame Isaaq, Arabic: عبدي ورسمة اساق ) was the chairman of the Southern Somali National Movement (SSNM), a military faction during the Somalia war. It consisted mainly of the Biimaal, Surre and other southern Mahad Dir clans. And also was member of Supreme Revolutionary Council.

== History ==
Abdi Warsame Isaq hailed from the Dir clan of the Dir clan family, more importantly from the Gaadsen.

Formally allied with Aideed, the chairman of the SSNM, Colonel Abdi Warsame in 1993 broke with General Aideed and took part of the SSNM with him when he aligned himself with Ali Mahdi.[3][4]
