= Gurdaan =

Gurdaan (also spelled Gurdan) is a village in Afgooye District, Lower Shabelle, Somalia. It is located at approximately and has an elevation of about 87 metres above sea level.
