= Mustafa Mohamed Moalim =

Mustafa Mohamed Moalin مصطفى محمد معلم
- Born: 25 March 1943; Mogadishu, Somalia
- Died: 27 December 2009 (aged 66); Fargo, North Dakota, United States
- Occupations: pilot, flight instructor
- Spouse: Khadija Abdulkhadir Mohamed
- Children: 6 sons, 2 daughters

Mustafa Mohamed Moalim (Somali: Mustafa Maxamed Macalin, Arabic: مصطفى محمد معلم) (25 March 1943 – 27 December 2009) was a prominent Somali aviator.

== Early life and education ==
Mustafa Moalin was born in Mogadishu, Somalia to a veterinarian father and a housewife mother. His one older brother Abdulkadir Mohamed Moalim became a well known veterinarian. Because of his father’s constant move to different regions, he and his brother grew up in different cities in Somalia including Mogadishu, Baidoa, Afgooye and Beledweyne. According to a cousin and some colleagues, Mustafa used to draw airplanes during his childhood, and young Mustafa becoming interested in flying and wanting to be a pilot. After earning high marks in his elementary school in Baidoa, at the age of 11, he was chosen to attend Italian schools including the Liceo Dinesa in Mogadishu. In 1959, Mustafa graduated at the top of his class from the Collegio Magistrale.

Moalin would later earn a Master of Military Arts and Science degree from Kyiv, Ukraine, the Soviet Union Air Force Academies. Mustafa held Laureate of Jurisprudence from the Somali National University Faculty of Law and a Diploma of Linguistics from Italian Linguistics Academy. He was a polyglot who specialized in Arabic, English, French, German, Italian and Russian languages.

== Military career ==
At age 17, in newly independent Somalia, Mustafa volunteered and was chosen to become a fighter pilot. He trained first at Egypt with Egyptian Air Force, where he made his first solo flight in a military aircraft. Sometime in 1961 he attended the Soviet air force pilot training school in Moscow where he was trained on the Mikoyan-Gurevich MiG-15, Mikoyan-Gurevich MiG-17. As a young officer, Mustafa served as a fighter pilot and was later appointed as fighter air squadron commander and flight training officer. In 1966 he trained at the Scuola AVvanzato Base Elica in Latina, Italy, eventually becoming a licensed flight instructor for military transport aircraft such as the C-45 Expeditor and C-47 Skytrain or Dakota (Douglas DC-3). In 1969 he was trained as pilot and flight instructor for a jet bomber Ilyushin Il-28 while he attended and graduated from Cosmonaut Academy in Kyiv, Ukraine in the former USSR. Upon returning to Somalia in 1973-74, he was promoted commander of the Balidoogle Air Force base, where he built Somalia's first Air Force School and became the first Chief of the Somali Air Force School. In 1975, Mustafa earned a Master of Military Arts and Science diploma from the Cosmonaut Academy in Kyiv, Ukraine in the former USSR.

During the Somali-Ethiopian conflict in 1977-78, his military career reached its zenith when he became Chief of Somali Air Force Operations and Commander of Air Force for Northwestern Somali Regions, Air Force bases in Hargeisa and Berbera and was credited to have led the establishment of Somali’s air superiority during the war. In Somali-Ethiopian conflict Mustafa is also credited to have shot down two enemy aircraft over Ogadenia territory and carrying out numerous strategic long distance bombing. In November 1978 Mustafa became the Air Force Academy's commander and a year later with request from the office of the presidency he was transferred and employed by Somali Airlines where he taught different courses and supervised many Pilots.

== Commercial pilot ==
In 1979 Mustafa Mohamed Moalin was employed at Somali Airlines where he oversaw the growth of the Somali Airlines into an international airline. He help bring first commercial jet planes Boeing 707 to Somali Airlines serving as Captain pilot and flight instructor after studying at American Air Academy in Dallas, Texas, US. In 1987, he became a licensed flight instructor in Airbus A310 after studying at Airbus training center in Toulouse, France. In total, he had 33 years and more than 27,000 hours of flying experience. He served as an airline pilot instructor and a national technical member. His flight experience destinations ranged across Africa, Middle East, Asia and Europe.

== Personal life ==
Mustafa Mohamed Moalin is married to Khadija Abdulkhadir Mohamed, a former Italian and Economics instructor and expert in Pedagogy, with whom he has six sons and two daughters (Kamaludin, Zahra, Nuradin, Shamsudin, Rahma, Mohamed, Sakhawadin and Fakhrudin). He also had 28 grandchildren.

Mustafa always refused to participate in any form of the Somali civil war by maintaining a neutral ground and staying away from clan politics. He loved his country and people and spent his last moments in exile in Moorhead, Minnesota, US, with his wife, children, grandchildren and other extended family members. Mustafa died on December 27, 2009, and was buried in Fargo Islamic Cemetery in Fargo, North Dakota.

== See also ==
- Somali Air Force

== Notes and references ==
- Taariikh nololeedka G/Sare Duuliye sare Mustafa Mohamed Macallim, Hiiraan, December 2009
