= Afgooye District =

Afgooye
- District
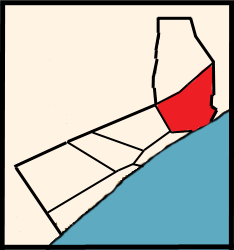
- Coordinates: 2.2292°N 45.0853°E
- Country: Somalia
- Region: Shabeellaha Hoose
- Capital: Afgooye
- Time zone: UTC+3 (EAT)

Afgooye District is a district in the southeastern Lower Shabelle (Shabeellaha Hoose) region of Somalia. Its capital lies at Afgooye.

== Administrative divisions ==
Gurdaan
