= Wituland =

Former monarchy in Africa

Witu Sultanate Wituland
- c. 1810–1905/1923
- Left: Flag of Sultan Fumobakari (1890); Right: Flag as a British protectorate (1893–1920)

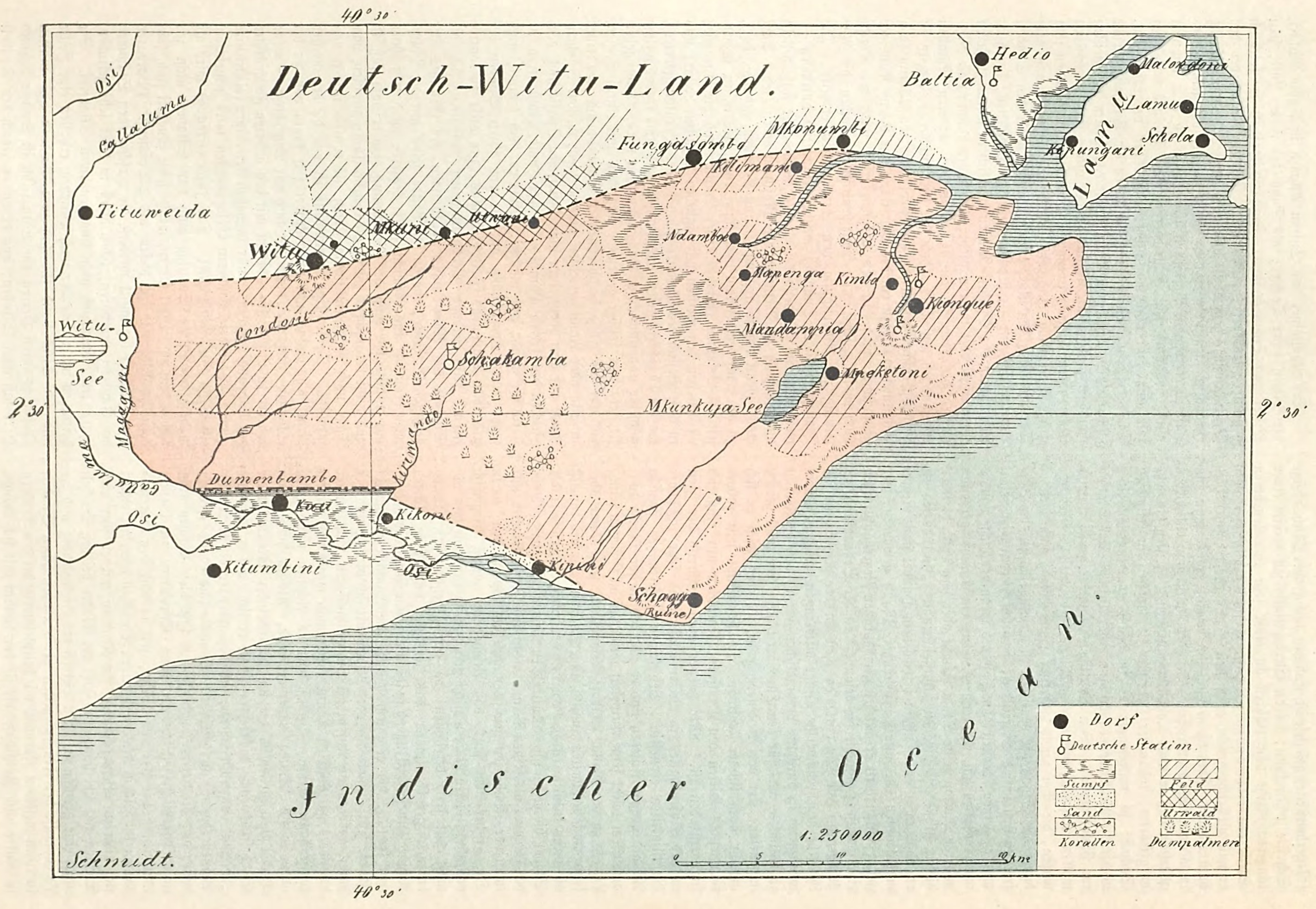
- Map showing the location of Witu on the Indian Ocean coast
- Status: c. 1810–1885: Independent state 1885–1890: German protectorate 1890–1905/1923: British protectorate
- Capital: Witu
- Common languages: Swahili · Arabic
- Religion: Islam
- Government: Monarchy
- Mafulme
  - 1810s - 1848: Bwana Mataka
  - July 1895 – 1923: Fumo `Umar ibn Ahmad
- History
  - Established: c. 1810
  - Disestablished: 1905/1923
Succeeded by
Kenya Colony

Wituland (also Witu, Vitu, Witu Protectorate or Swahililand) was a territory of approximately 3,000 square kilometres (1,200 mi^{2}) in East Africa centered on the town of Witu, just inland from the Indian Ocean port of Lamu, north of the mouth of the Tana River in what is now Kenya.

== History ==
=== Establishment of the Witu Sultanate ===
Founded in the 1810s and then becoming fully independent from nominal Pate rule in 1858 after several abortive moves to the mainland, the native sultanate of Wituland was a haven for slaves fleeing the Zanzibar slave trade and thus a target of attacks from the Sultanate of Zanzibar (ruled by a branch of the Omani dynasty, under British protectorate). Facing an increase in slaving raids from the Sultanate of Zanzibar, the Sultan of Witu formally requested German protection so that he "finally has relief from the attacks of Zanzibar warriors."

=== Witu Relations with the Geledi Sultanate ===
The Geledi Sultanate was a powerful Somali state based in the inter-riverine region in southern Somalia that held sway over the Jubba and Shabelle rivers. Witu Sultans had strong ties with Sultan Yusuf Mahamud Ibrahim as both states were mutually antagonistic towards Zanzibar and had shared commercial interests. On the island of Siyu the Sultan of Witu Bwana Mataka had been faced with an insurrection and was deposed in the 1820s. The defiant islanders alongside some Somalis who were more loyal to the prior administration called for Omani occupation of the island. Yusuf would intervene and Witu would prove victorious as it would bring the Sultan to engage a newly emerging militant group in Bardera which was a key trade hub and where the Siyu Somalis drew their strength. Both states were interested in ivory trade through the Jubba river continuing to flourish as a great source of revenue for the region. Later following their victory at Siyu over the militant Somalis and Omani sympathisers the Witu Sultan sent aid before Yusuf engaged and ultimately lost against the Omani aligned Bimaals in 1848 at the Battle of Adaddey Suleyman.

=== German protectorate (1885–90) ===
In 1885, the German brothers Clemens and Gustav Denhardt negotiated a treaty with Ahmed ibn Fumo Bakari, the first mfalme (Swahili for sultan or king) of Witu who ceded, on 8 April 1885, 25 square miles of territory to the brothers' "Tana Company", and the remainder of the Wituland became the German Protectorate of Wituland (Deutsch-Witu) on 27 May 1885. The Reich was represented there by the German Residents: Gustav Denhardt (1856–1917; in office 8 April 1885 – 1 July 1890) and his deputy Clemens Andreas Denhardt (1852–1928). German rule was relatively mild, and the territory continued being a haven for escaped slaves.

In 1889, Wituland issued a number of postage stamps although their postal usage has not been verified.

=== British rule and the Witu expeditions ===
In accord with the 1890 Heligoland–Zanzibar Treaty, on 18 June 1890 a British protectorate was declared, and on 1 July 1890 imperial Germany renounced its protectorate, ceding the Wituland to Great Britain to become part of British East Africa. There were widespread protests from the inhabitants of the territory, who wished to remain under Germany's protection.

==== First expedition (1890) ====
Shortly afterwards several German merchants were murdered, and a mixed British & Zanzibari punitive expedition was sent out. The troops landed and descended on Witu on October 26, 1890. After a series of shoot-outs, Sultan Fumo Bakari ibn Ahmad fled from the town, with roughly 3,000 of his remaining gunmen. He was deposed by the British and died soon afterwards.

After a short reign by Bwana Shaykh ibn Ahmad, the rulership (now reduced to a shaykhdom and made a vassal of the Zanzibar Sultanate) was given to Fumo `Umar ibn Ahamd. Slavery was also formally abolished in Witu in March 1891, and Indian police were brought in to enforce the new agreement.

==== Second expedition (1893) ====
A brother of Fumo Bakari, by the name of Fumo Oman, resisted the new regime and began leading increasingly violent raids on villages and farms around the nearby town of Jongeni, northeast of Witu. A brief attempt at diplomacy failed, and the British and Zanzibari governments prepared a second naval expedition to sail to Witu.

A small expeditionary force landed at Witu in July and a second request to negotiate was sent to Fumo Oman. It was rejected and the marines marched on the principal towns under rebel control. Thick forest and camouflaged pits with sharpened stakes surrounded the strongly fortified towns, and the rebel gunmen had prepared defensive positions that allowed for heavy fire. However, after prolonged and intense shoot-outs, the naval marines fought their way into each town, and destroyed the fortifications. Fumo Oman fled and Fumo 'Umari bin Hamid was reinstated.

Fumo 'Umari moved the capital to Jongeni, but the growth of British power and of the regional importance of Zanzibar saw Witu's position and influence gradually decline.

== End of Witu ==
In 1905 oversight for Witu was moved from the Foreign Office to the Colonial Office, and following this Witu was administered as a part of Tana District of the Kenya Coast Protectorate. After the 1923 death of Umari bin Hamid the question of Witu as a distinct entity was finally closed.

== List of rulers ==
The known ruling Sultans (styled mfalume in Swahili) are:

- 1810s-1848: Bwana Mataka
- 1848- 1858: Mohammed Sheikh (son of Bwana Mataka)
- 1858–1888: Ahmad ibn Fumo Bakari
- 1888–1890: Fumo Bakari ibn Ahmad
- 1890–1891: Bwana Shaykh ibn Ahmad
- 1891–1893: Fumo `Umar ibn Ahmad (1st time)
- 1893 – 7 July 1895: Vacant
- 7 July 1895 – 1923: Fumo `Umar ibn Ahmad (2nd time)

== See also ==
- Pate
- Lamu
- Zanzibar
- Yusuf Mahamud Ibrahim
- Sultanate of the Geledi
