= Silcis =

Somali subclan

Silis Silcis
- Ethnicity: Somali clan.
- Location: Afgoye, Jowhar, Warsheikh
- Parent tribe: Gorgarte Hawiye
- Branches: Nugaale Silcis Bedare Silcis Liboowi Silcis
- Language: Somali.
- Religion: Sunni Islam

The Silcis (sometimes spelled "Sil'is" or "Seles" in historical texts) are a Somali subclan. They are part of the Gorgaarte subclan of the Hawiye clan, which is one of the major clans of the Somali people.

The Silcis inhabit the traditional coastal region of Benadir in the southern part of Somalia. This region should not be confused with the much smaller present day Banaadir administrative region (gobol) which contains Somalia’s capital Mogadishu. Silcis live, or have historically lived, along the Shabeelle River in towns such as Afgooye and Jowhaar, as well as along the coast, especially in Mogadishu and Warsheekh.

== Origin of the Silcis subclan ==
The Silcis are a subclan of the Gorgaarte, who are in turn a subclan of the Hawiye. According to oral tradition, Gorgaarte, a son of the ancestor Hawiye, had himself seven sons, the third of whom was Silcis. When his seventh son, Maane, was born, each son gave a gift; however Maxamed and Maxamuud suspected Maane of being illegitimate and refused to give a gift. As a result, Gorgaarte said prayers for each of his sons, with the exception of Maxamed and Maxamuud, whom he cursed. According to this tradition, when Gorgaate prayed for his sons, he asked for something different for each of them, and for the descendants of Silcis he asked them to be the guardians and teachers of the Quran, the holy book of Islam:

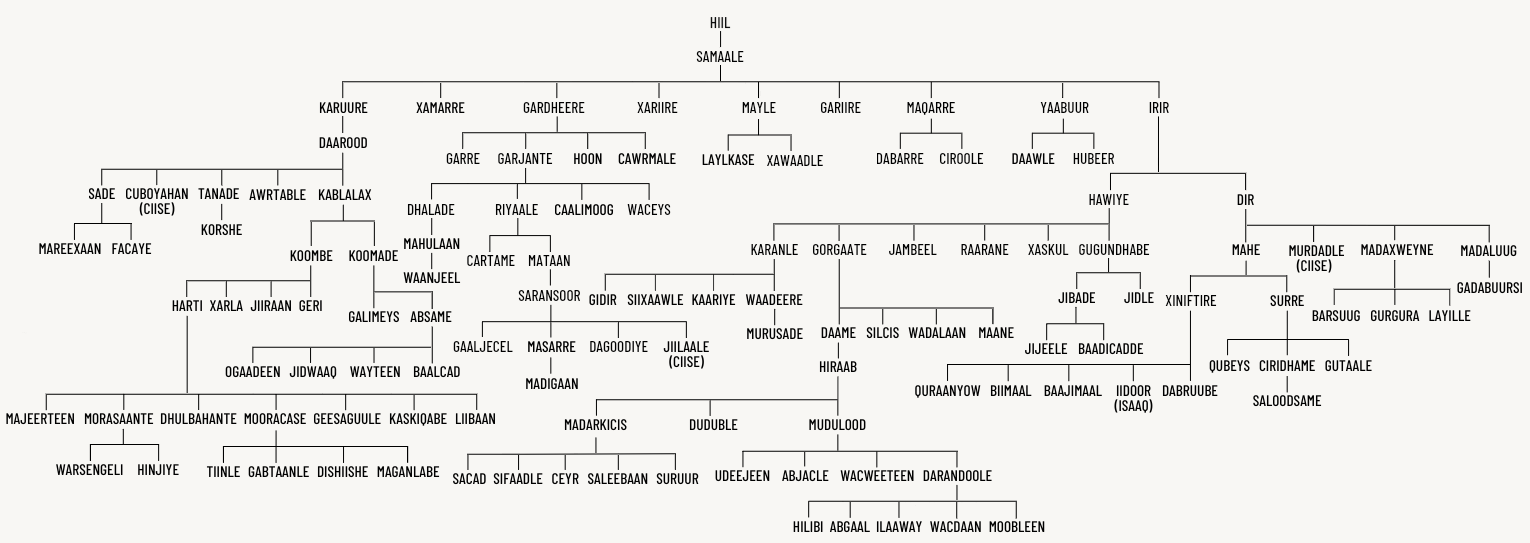
Genealogical tree of Somali clans

"Les clans issus de Gorgaarte Hawiyye sont de nos jours, et de loin, les plus nombreux et les plus puissants de toute la confédération hawiyye. Selon une tradition rapportée par Colucci, Gorgaarte eur sept fils : Maxamed, dont se réclament les Reer Shabeelle, Maxamuud, Sil'is, Mareexaan, Wadalaan, Daame et Maane, le benjamin. Lorsque naquit ce dernier, son frère Wadalaan lui fit présent d'un poignard, Sil'is d'un livre d'études coraniques, Mareexaan d'une vache et Daame, le plus généreux, d'un dromadaire chargé de récipients remplis de lait. Quand à Maxamed et Maxamuud, également appelés Kebhedle et Tedaalle, qui soupçonnaient Maane d'être un bâtard, il refusèrent de lui faire un présent. Gorgaarte rendit grâces à Allah et dit : 'Que les descendants de Wadalaan aient désormais la charge des sacrifices rituels, et que ceux de Sil'is conservent et transmettent l'enseignement du Coran. Que les fils de Mareexaan soient riches en troupeaux et que ceux de Daame aient une nombreuse descendance. Mais Maxamuud n'aura point de descenda mâle, et Maxamed n'engendrera que des esclaves.' La plupart des clans Gorgaarte sont en effet issus de l'union de Daame et de Faadumo Karanle..."

(“The clans descended from Gorgaarte Hawiyye are by far the most numerous and powerful in the entire Hawiyye confederation. According to a tradition reported by Colucci, Gorgaarte had seven sons: Maxamed, to whom the Reer Shabeelle claim to belong, Maxamuud, Sil'is, Mareexaan, Wadalaan, Daame and Maane, the youngest. When the latter was born, his brother Wadalaan presented him with a dagger, Sil'is with a book of Qur'anic studies, Mareexaan with a cow and Daame, the most generous, with a camel loaded with containers full of milk. As for Maxamed and Maxamuud, also known as Kebhedle and Tedaalle, who suspected Maane of being a bastard, they refused to give him a present. Gorgaarte gave thanks to Allah and said: 'May the descendants of Wadalaan henceforth be in charge of ritual sacrifices, and may those of Sil'is preserve and transmit the teaching of the Koran. May the sons of Mareexaan be rich in herds, and may those of Daame have numerous descendants. But Maxamuud will have no male descendant, and Maxamed will beget only slaves.' Most Gorgaarte clans are in fact descended from the union of Daame and Faadumo Karanle...")

== Emergence and early history of the Silcis Sultanate ==
The Silcis rose to prominence in the Shabeelle River region following the disintegration of the Ajuuraan Sultanate, which controlled a large part of southern Somalia, and with which the Silcis are connected. Cassanelli points out that in Geledi oral history accounts, the Silcis are often viewed as "that section of the Ajuran who governed the Afgoy district". He asserts that Geledi accounts "attest to the continuity and similarity of Ajuran and Sil'is rule".

The Silcis centre of power was in Lama Jiidle (present day Afgooye). Lama Jiidle means "two roads" in Somali. Barile erroneously claims that Afgooye's previous name was simply "Seles" (the common Italian spelling of Silcis).

The Silcis imposed taxation on their subject clans, such as the Wacdaan, a fellow subclan of the Gurgate Hawiye, and the Geledi, a Rahanweyn subclan. According to Virginia Luling, "The Sil'is imposed their dominion on the Geledi, who had to pay as tribute a measure (suus) of grain every day from each household; it was collected and loaded on a camel, others say a donkey. A tax was also imposed on those who brought their stock to water at the river”. Barile also describes the taxes levied by the Silcis.

A controversial aspect of traditional Geledi and Wacdaan accounts of Silcis rule is the imposition by the Silcis sultan of ius primae noctis. According to Eno, "it was ‘Xeer’ [customary] for every Geledi bride... to celebrate her honeymoon [first] with a Silcis-Gorgaate male before she could celebrate the occasion with her official marital husband".

Luling, however, points out that ius primae noctis was "A habit regularly attributed to tyrants in this part of Somalia”. It is thus possible that the accounts of the Silcis practice were exaggerated by the clans they ruled. It is not known to what extent the Silcis sultans engaged in this practice. However, the importance of this account to Geledi and Wacdaan history should not be discounted or dismissed.

== Overthrow of Silcis ==
The final ruler of the Silcis in Lama Jiidle (Afgooye) was the sultan 'Umur Abukar Abroone. According to Luling, "His daughter Imbia used to go round collecting the daily tribute of grain, accompanied by her slaves" from her father's Wacdaan and Geledi subjects. Oral accounts hold that one day, "when the Sultan's daughter came round to collect the tribute, she got a beating instead of the grain", as the Geledi refused to pay. When Imbia reported this event to her father, he exclaimed "waa la i afgooye", literally "they have cut off my mouth", meaning that the regime's source of provision had been terminated. Lama Jiidle's name became Afgooye to commemorate this victory over the Silcis.

According to Cassanelli, “the Geledi (Rahanweyn) and Wa'dan (Darandolle Gurgate) allied to drive the Sil'is from Afgoy”.

The Silcis Sultanate in the Afgooye region was replaced by the Geledi Sultanate.

== Later history ==
Some authors claim that the Silcis ceased to be a significant group after their overthrow in Afgooye. Puccioni states that "the Silcis were reduced to a small, sparse grouping along the Shabeelle from Afgooye to Bulo Mererta [“i Seles sono ridotti a piccoli raggruppamenti sparsi lungo lo Scebeli da Afgoi a Bulo Mererta”]. Luling claims that the Silcis "became an insignificant, scattered people”.

It is apparent, however, from the historical record beginning in the 19th century that the Silcis became established at Warsheekh and that this became their new centre. The Italian colonial administration signed a "TREATY of Peace, Friendship and Protection" with the "Chiefs of Warsheekh (Seles Gorgate and Abgal)" on August 26, 1894. The Italians also confirmed Haji Mao Mallim Elmi, a Silcis member, as the chief of Warsheekh in 1897.

In 1951, a large number of representatives of the Silcis submitted an appeal to the United Nations Advisory Council for the Trust Territory of Somaliland under Italian Administration, in order to protest the taking of Silcis lands by Italians. The signatories submitted the appeal “on behalf of the Seles Gorgate inhabitants living in Warsheikh, Giohar, Harar, Jigjiga, Mogadishu and Afgoi".
