= Bimaal =

Somali clan

Bimaal بيمال
- Dir Somali clan
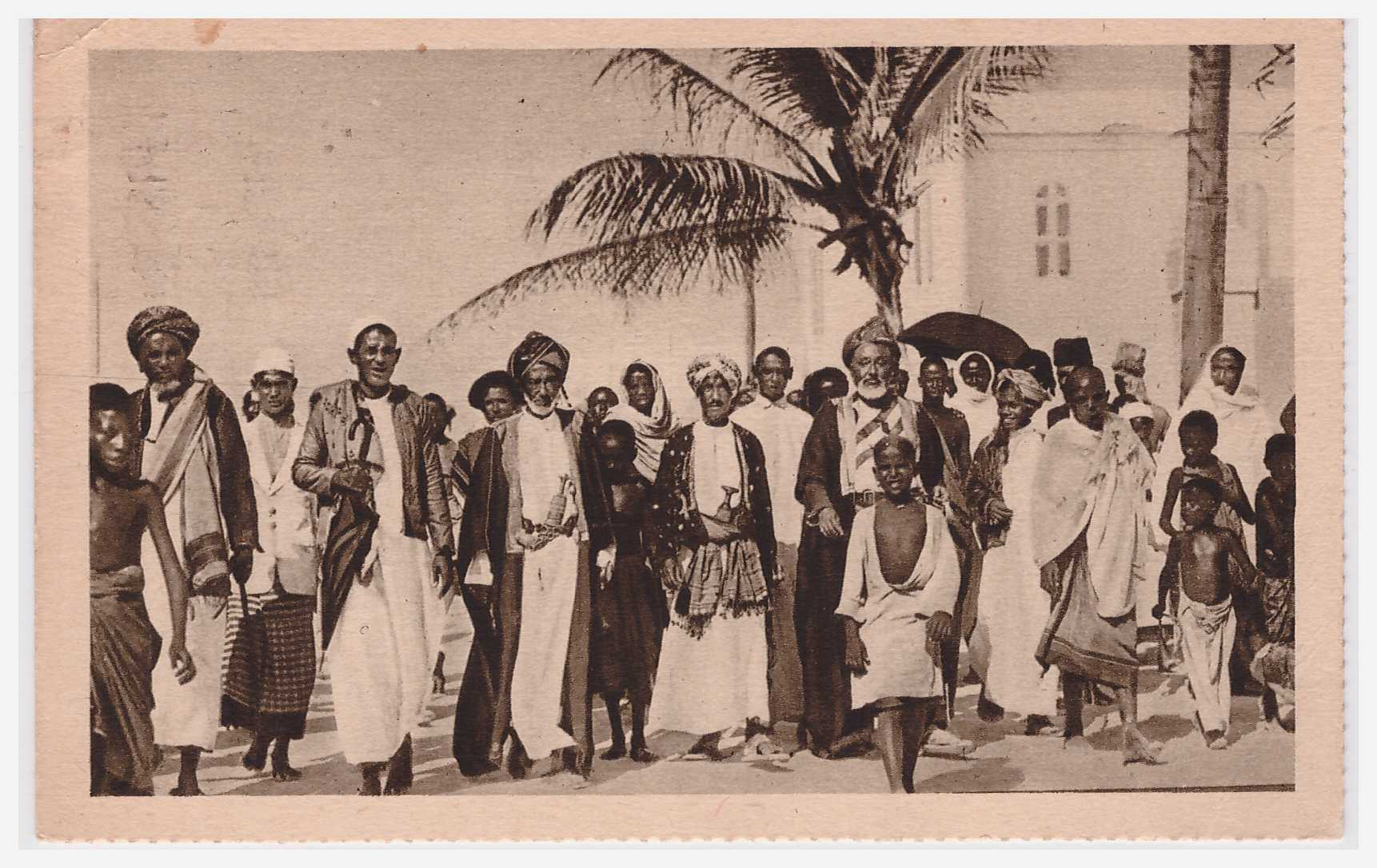
- Notable elders belonging to the Bimaal clan pictured in Merca
- Ethnicity: Somali
- Location: Somalia
- Descended from: Abu-Bakr (Dir)
- Parent tribe: Dir
- Branches: Gamaase Ali Geryaham; Sa'ad; Daadow; Ismiin; Abdirahman (Gaadsan)
- Language: Somali; Arabic
- Religion: Sunni Islam

The Bimaal or Bimal, (Somali: Biimaal; Arabic:بيمال) are a sub-clan of the major Dir clan family. This clan is widely known for leading a resistance against the colonials in northern Somalia for decades which can be compared to the war of the Sayyid in Somaliland. The Biimaal mainly lives in southern Somalia, the Somali region of Ethiopia, which their Gaadsen sub-clan mainly inhabits.

== Overview ==
The Bimal are the dominant clan in Merca district of Lower Shabelle region and make up the majority in Jammaame district of Lower Jubba region. They also live in large numbers inhabit the Somali region of Ethiopia. The Bimal are a war-like clan that was known for their struggle and long resistance against the Italians.

The Bimal are a Dir clan that migrated to Lower Shabelle centuries ago and settled on the coast between Gelib-marka and Brava as sedentary farmers. The Bimal are divided into four subclans, the Saad, Ismin, Suleyman, and Abdirahman.

As a Dir sub-clan, the Bīmāli have immediate lineal ties with the Gadabuursi, Surre (Abdalle and Qubeys), the Issa, the Bajimal, the Gaadsan, the Madigan, the Gurgura, the Quranyow-Garre, Gurre, Gariire, other Dir sub-clans and they have lineal ties with the Hawiye (Irir), Hawadle, Ajuraan, Degoodi, Gaalje'el clan groups, who share the same ancestor Samaale.

== History ==
Following the Ajuran state disintegration, a mysterious new group in the vicinity of Merca, known as the El Amir believe to be from the Abgaal origin made its appearance in the late 17th century. According to an account collected by Guillain in 1847, a leader known as Amir formed a following which invaded the territory of Merca and expelled the Ajuran clan. The El Amir then ruled for thirty-four years until the Biimaal expelled them and definitively occupied Merca. They quickly gained control of the city and trade of the region.

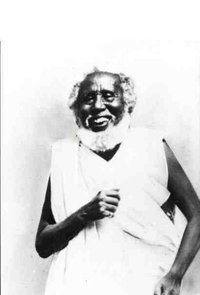
Suldaan Abdirahman Ali Isse, the sultan of Biimal in the 60s

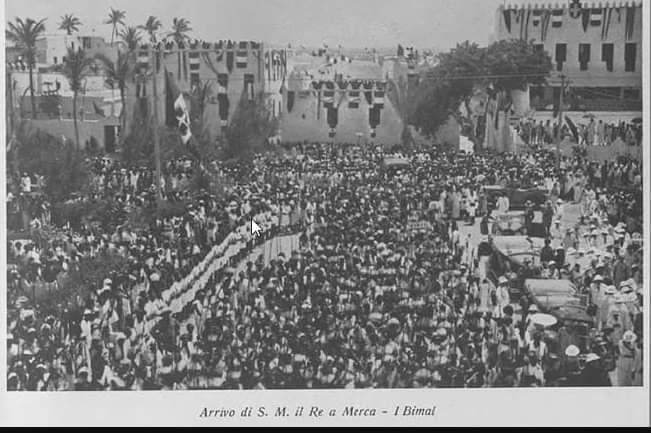
The welcoming of His Majesty the King of Italy in Merca 1935

Traditions of Bimal clan of Merka district reflect preoccupied agricultural production for at least the last 200 years. Besides the Biimal revolt against the Ajuran. Later, they had engaged in multiple wars and revolts with the Sultanate of the Geledi.

One of the most powerful sultanates to have emerged from southern Somalia called the Geledi Sultanate centered in Afgooye in the late 17th century. It incorporated the Merca territory into its kingdom until the Bimaal rebelled in the mid-1800s for independence. The Sultanate of Geledi tried to attack and destroy the Bimaal clan many times to try and re-capture the coastal city of Merca. But the Bimal of Merca managed to defeat the Geledi Sultanate 2 times. In 1843, Yusuf Mahamud, Sultan of Geledi, vowed to destroy the Bimaal for once and for all and mobilizes the Geledi army. In 1848, the Sultan of the Geledi, Yusuf Mahamud was killed at Adaddey Suleyman, a village near Merca, in a battle between the Bimaal and Geledi Sultanate. His son Sultan Ahmed Yusuf tried to see revenge but was also killed in 1878 at Agaaran, near Marka by the Bimal. Ensuing Merca independence from Geledi's overrule.

The Biimaal Sultanate maintained armies, courts, prisons, and were highly dynamic and out seeking eager to link with global trade. They invited experts from India and around the world, to train their people in skills such as weaving, textile industry, milling and agricultural production, and topographical surveys used to make irrigation canals. This massive development the Biimaal were undertaking with their sultanate was sabotaged by the Italians, which was one of the reasons why the Biimaal revolt began.

The Bimaal also engage in pastoralism, settled farming and were also successful merchants and traders in the 19th century. The Bimaal have proved in the past to be a bellicose clan, not only against their neighbours, but also against Italian colonial encroachment.

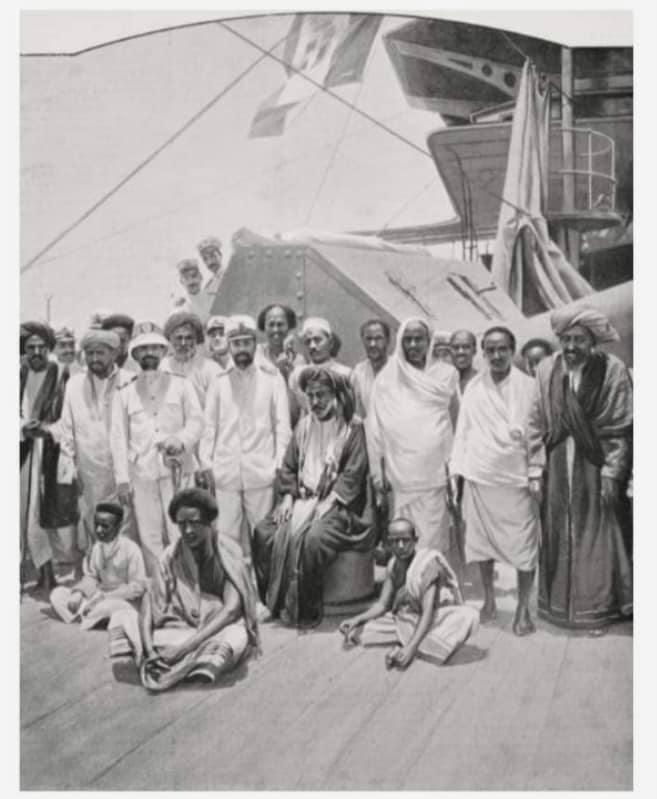
Bimal elders and the sultan of the clan discussing matters with Italian figures on board of the Marco Polo.

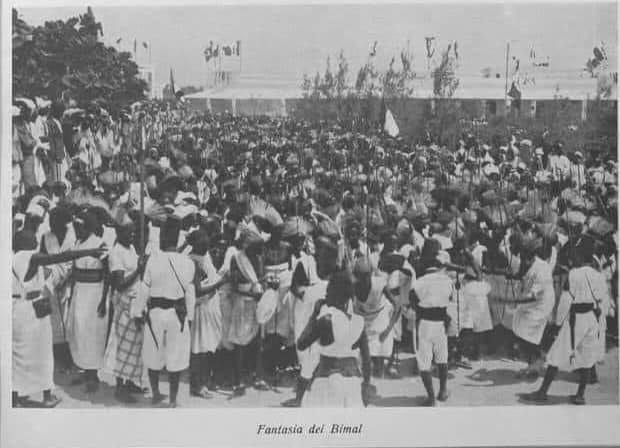
Biimal warriors in Merca

The Italians undermined the Biimaal Sultanate, and changed the traditional structures in the South-Central by retitling the elders "capo qabiil" and incorporating them into their administrative system. The Bimaal violently resisted the imposition of colonialism fought against the Italian colonialists in a twenty-year war known as the Bimaal revolt in which many of their warriors assassinated some Italian soldiers. In the early 1930s, the Bimaal accepted the Italian rule in Merca and welcomed the Italian king in 1935. Some of them fought with the Italians in their conquest of Ethiopia in 1936.

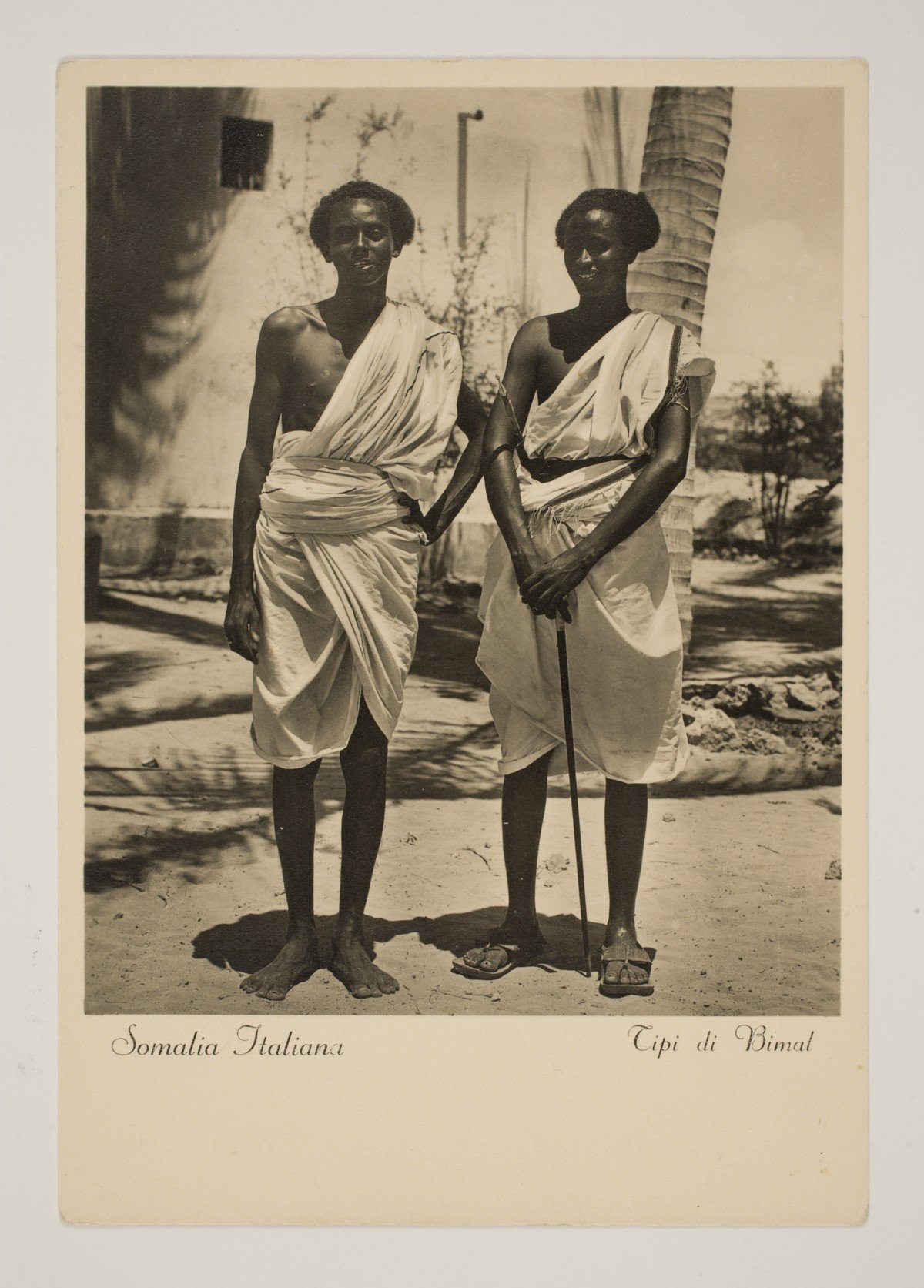
Biimal men, 1927

The Bimal also formed their own organization during the Somali Civil War, the Southern Somali National Movement (SSNM). Colonel Abdi Warsame in 1993, broke with General Aideed and took part of the SSNM with him when he aligned himself with Ali Mahdi.

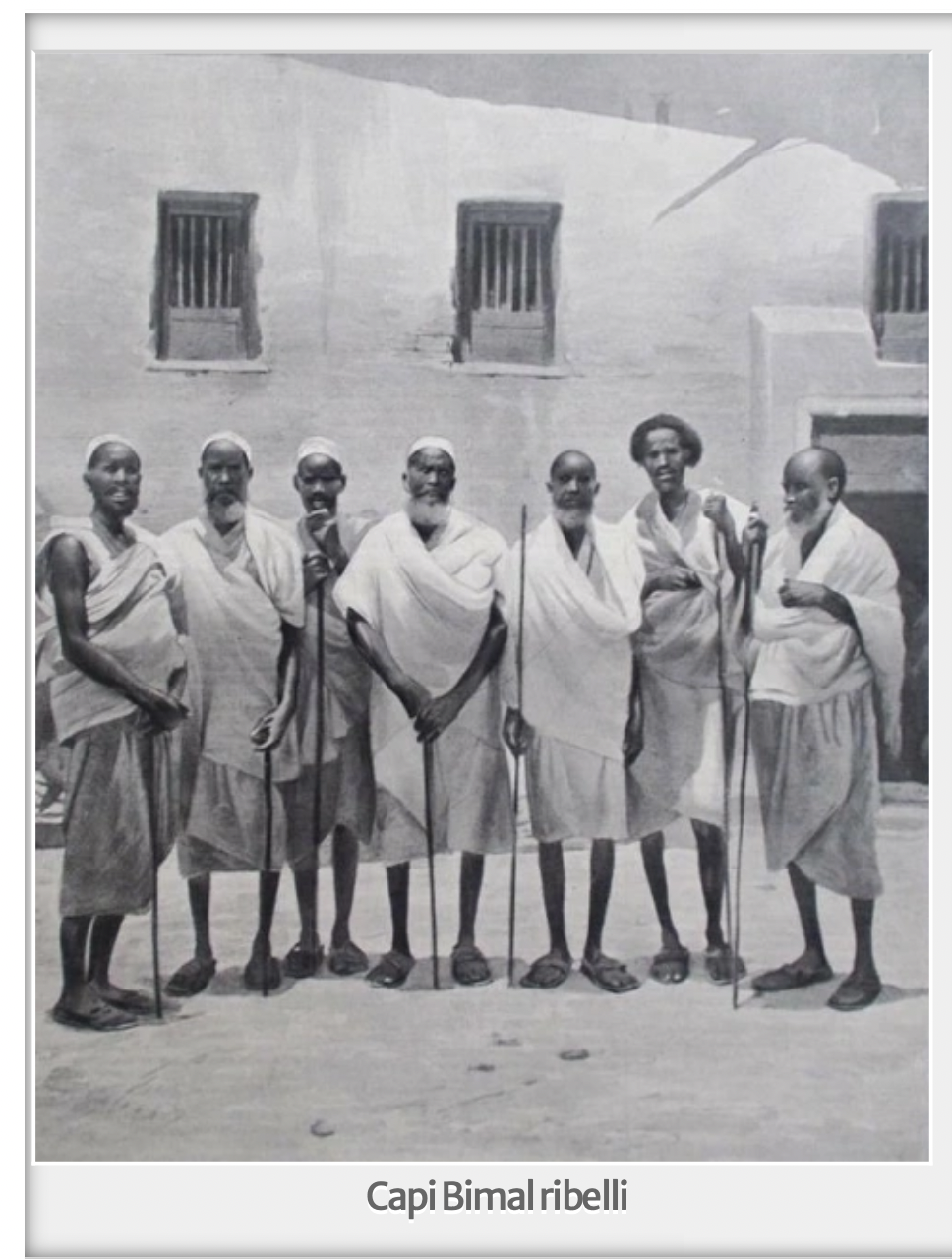
Biimal rebel leaders

=== Bīmāl revolt ===
The Bimal revolt or Bimal resistance or Merca revolt (Somali: Dagaalkii Biimaal iyo Talyaaniga) is widely known resistance fought against the colonials in southern Somalia in and around the current Lower Shebelle, Banadir, Middle Shabelle (Somali: Shabeela Hoose) for decades (1896-1926), which can be -in a little way- compared to the war of the Mad Mullah in northern Somalia.

=== Abdirahman Eremage (Gaadsan) ===
Isaaq or "Reer Sheikh Isxaaq" and The Gaadsan or reer Aw-Gaadsan are siblings with the Bimaal trace themselves from holymen and sheikhs living as pastoral nomads. Such religious lineages of sheikhs and holy-men are generally referred to as 'reer aw' or 'wadaaddo'. They are nominally 'men of God' possessed of blessing by definition rather than learned. Although it doesn't necessary mean that all their lineages make religion their profession. The name of Geedsan or Gaadsen is a nickname, which means "genuine" given by his scholar called Sheikh Abdirahman Ulamadoobe. Gaadsan are mainly found in Somali Galbeed (Somali region) and live in regions such as Afdher, in Jarrati and surrounding areas, Nusdasriq town in Qoraxay and Liban region. Gaadsan are also found in Somalia in Bakool, Geddo and the two jubas as well as Kenya (NFD).

== Clan tree ==
The following list is based on the People of the Horn of Africa and a paper published in March 2002 by Ambroso Guido.

Bimaal (Jamal) bin Mahamed

- Sacad
- Daadow
- Ismiin
- Gadsen

== Indian Ocean slave trade ==
Biimal were one of the Somali clans involved in the Indian Ocean slave trade as reported by the Italians, the Biimal sultanate was one of the most powerful sultanate in southerner Somalia and brought many Bantu slaves to its land. The Bantus were forced labour on Biimal-owned plantations while some were sold as part of the Indian Ocean slave trade. In December 1923, when Cesare Maria de Vecchi (the first Governor of Somalia) arrived in Somalia, slavery was being practiced in many areas of the country. Particularly in predominantly Biimal controlled area of Lower Shabelle region. The Italian colonial administration abolished slavery in Italian Somaliland at the turn of the 20th century. However, some Somali clans notably the Biimal clan opposed this idea. The Bimaals fought Italians to keep their slaves. Although the Italians freed some Bantus from the Biimaal, some Bantu groups, remained enslaved well until the 1930s, and continued to be despised and discriminated against by large parts of Somali society.

== Udubland state ==
The Biimal elders and leaders established the autonomous state of Udubland on 17 February 2011 claiming both Lower Shabelle and Lower Jubba. Dr. Ibraahim C/llaahi Caddow was elected as the president of the state of Udubland.

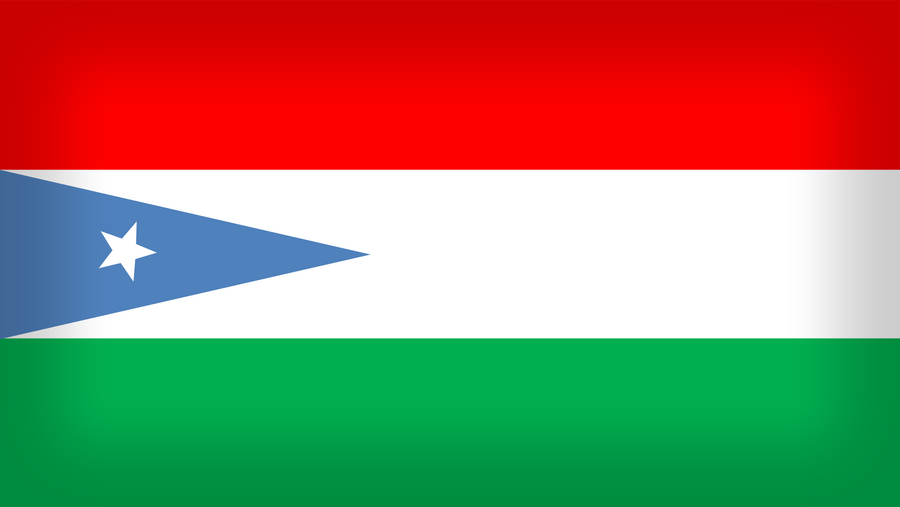
The flag of Biimal & Udubland state

== Notable figures ==
Politicians

- Abdullahi Sheikh Ismail, former Somali ambassador to Russian Federation and EU, former foreign minister, 1990 and 2004-2006, deputy prime minister and minister of constitutional affairs of TFG, 2006.
- Ahmed Hassan Gabobe, former Minister of Justice and Religious Affairs
- Abdirahman Haji Aden (Ibbi), former minister of fishery and marine resources of TNG, 2000-2004, state minister, 2004-2006.
- Colonel Abdi Warsame Isaq, one of the Somali Socialist Supreme Council members and positioned different ministerial posts during Bare's regime, chairman of the Southern Somali National Movement (SSNM)
- Mohamed Adam Mo'alim Ali, Minister of Livestock, Forestry & Range-FGS. Former Minister of Public Works, Reconstruction & Housing - Somali Federal Government.
- Dr. Ibraahim C/llaahi Caddow, president of Udubland state
- Abdullahi Omar Abshir (Abshirow), the 2nd Deputy Speaker of the House of Representatives of Somalia and former Deputy Minister
- Abdullahi Ali Ahmed Waafow, General and mayor of Marka
- General Maxamuud cabdi sheekh (xujaale), the commander chief of Jubbaland state police
- Xuseen Cali Xaaji, member of Somali Federal Parliament
- Said Mohamed ali, worked different positions in Somalia, vice chairman of SSNM and well known political figure in Somalia
- Colonel Abdi Ali Jamame, high ranking colonel in former Somali Armed Forces.
- General Abdi Osman Mohamed Shash (Cabdi Caluuq)
- Axmed Cumar Shaati, interim chairman of the freedom fighters in Somali region
- Colonel Ibrahim Yahia Hassan
- Colonel Abdi Ali Abdullahi
- Colonel Abdi Ali (Abdi Ingiris)
- Farxiya Maxamed Cabdi, member of Somali Federal Parliament
- Colonel Balbaal C, high ranking colonel in former Somali Armed Forces.
- Cabdullahi Xuseen Cali, member of Somali Federal Parliament

Religious leaders

Sheikh Abdi Abikar Gafle, famous religious leader and warrior

Macalin Mursal, one of the Biimal revolt leaders

Sheikh Abdurahman Mubarak, one of the most famous sheikhs in Somalia

Sheikh Xassan Yusuf

Sheikh Macalin Shiikheey, one of the famous Somali clerics

Sheik Mohammed Kulale

Activists

- Mana Haji, peace activist.
- Isse Sheikh Ismail, prominent peace activist.
- Abdisatar Ona, prominent Instagram influencer and Somali cultural leader.

Mohamed Amiin Addow local and international journalist, served Radio Shabelle, CNN and Swedish Radio & Asad Haashi, politician, highly influential person in horn of africa and served as east africa regional director of INTERSOL Denmark.
