= Sultanate of the Geledi =

East African sultanate

Sultanate of the Geledi Saldanadda Geledi (Somali) سلطنة غلدي (Arabic)
- 1695–1911
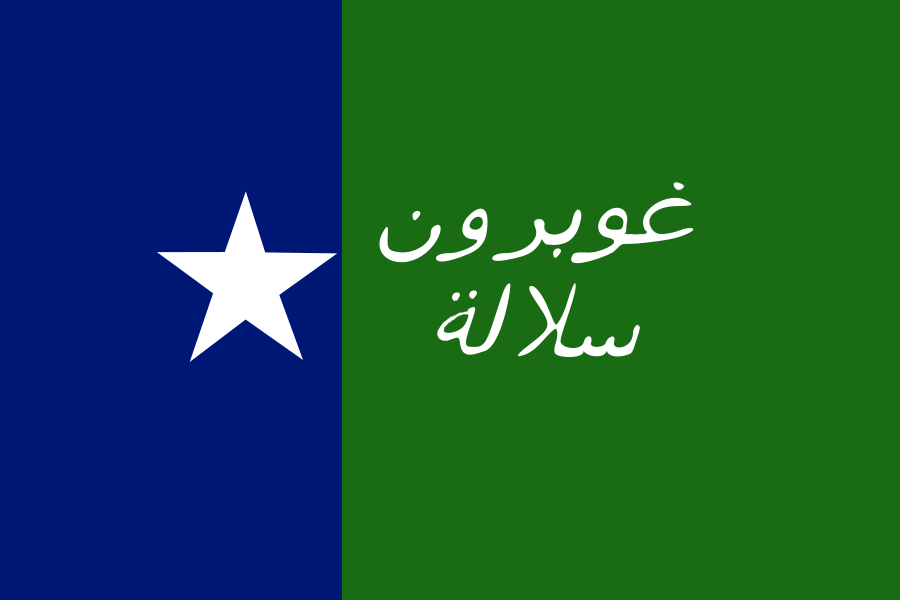
- Flag

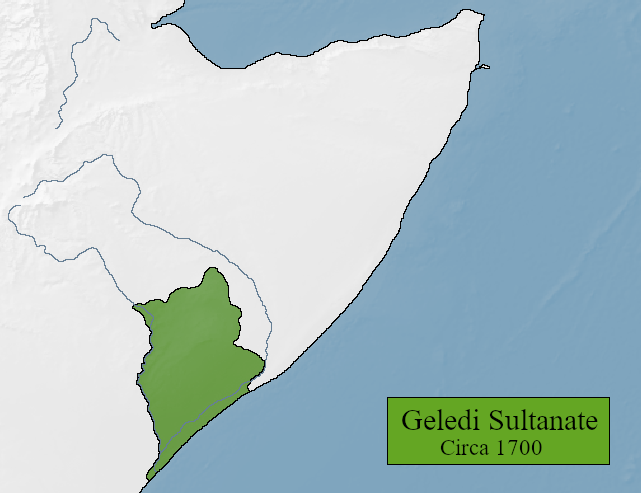

- Geledi Sultanate and surrounding areas in 1915, at the south of Somalia
- Status: 1695–1901 independent kingdom, Protectorate of Italy from 1902–1911
- Capital: Afgooye
- Common languages: Somali · Arabic
- Religion: Sunni Islam
- Demonyms: Somali, Geledi
- Government: Monarchy
- Ibrahim Adeer
- Mahamud Ibrahim
- Yusuf Mahamud Ibrahim
- Ahmed Yusuf Mahamud
- Osman Ahmed
- Sulṭān Imam Sheikh
  - Late-17th century–mid 18th century: Ibrahim Adeer
  - 1878–early 1920s: Osman Ahmed
- History
  - Established after the overthrow of the Silcis and Ajuran Somalis: 1695
  - Complete integration into Italian Somaliland: 1911
Preceded by	Succeeded by
Ajuran Sultanate	Italian Somaliland
- Today part of: Somalia

The Sultanate of the Geledi (Somali: Saldanadda Geledi, Arabic: سلطنة غلدي) also known as the Gobroon dynasty, was a Somali kingdom that ruled parts of the Horn of Africa during the late-17th century to the early 20th century. The Sultanate was governed by the Gobroon dynasty. According to the Virginia Luling, Geledi traditions presented the Gobroon as part of the Geledi ruling lineage, while an alternative tradition recorded from Adawiin religious specialists held that the Gobroon arrived later and were not descendants of the Geledi, but came from the Gaaljacel, a pastoral clan. It was established by the Geledi leader Ibrahim Adeer, who had defeated various vassals of the Ajuran Sultanate and elevated the Gobroon to wield significant political power. Following Mahamud Ibrahim's consolidation, the dynasty reached its apex under Yusuf Mahamud Ibrahim, who successfully modernized the Geledi economy and eliminated regional threats with the Conquest of Bardera in 1843, and would go on to receive tribute from Said bin Sultan, the ruler of the Omani Empire. Geledi Sultans had strong regional ties and built alliances with the Pate and Witu Sultanates on the Swahili coast. Trade and Geledi power would continue to remain strong until the death of the well known Sultan Ahmed Yusuf in 1878. The sultanate was eventually incorporated into Italian Somaliland in 1911.

== History ==
=== Origins of the sultanate ===
At the end of the 17th century, the Ajuran Sultanate was in its decline and various vassals were breaking free or being absorbed by new Somali powers. One of these powers was the Silcis Sultanate, which began consolidating its rule over the Afgooye region. Ibrahim Adeer led the revolt against the Silcis ruler Umar Abrone and his oppressive daughter, Princess Fay. After his victory over the Silcis, Ibrahim then proclaimed himself Sultan and subsequently founded the Gobroon dynasty.

The Geledi Sultanate was a Rahanweyn Kingdom ruled by the noble Geledi which held sway over the Jubba and Shabelle rivers in the interior and the Benadir coast. The Geledi Sultanate had enough power to force southern Arabians to pay tribute.

The nobles within the Geledi claim descent from Abadir Umar ar-Rida. He had three other brothers, Fakhr and with two others of whom their names are given differently as Shams, Umudi, Alahi and Ahmed. Together they were known as Afarta Timid, 'the four who came', indicating their origins from Arabia. Claims of descent from Arabia was mainly for legitimacy reasons.

=== Conflict with the Bimaal and Haji Ali Majeerteen ===
==== The Bimaal ====
The first documented conflict between the Geledi and Bimaal Somali clans would be the Battle of Adaddey Suleyman. After Geledi Sultan Yusuf Mahamud Ibrahim won a battle at the island of Siyu over the Salafist Somalis led by Haji Ali Majeerteen, the Witu Sultan would send aid to sultan Yusuf before he departed to meet the Bimaal rebels, who refused to join his battles against the extremist Salafist rulers in Bardera. Even allying them in Mungiya. The two forces finally would clash at Adadday Suleyman in 1848, a village near Merca. The Bimaal defended themselves, and after three days of fierce war, Sultan Yusuf Mahamud and his brother were killed, and ultimately lost against the Omani aligned Bimaal rebels in 1848.

Years later, in 1878, Sultan Yusuf's son;Ahmed Yusuf Mahamud made preparations to finally defeat the Bimaal, as his father failed to. Ahmed's brother Abobokur Yusuf warned him, not to go through with the attack as the Geledi had an influential ally refuse to join the upcoming campaign. Sultan Ahmed, Reprimanding his brother, said he could watch the women & children then. With Abobokur eventually deciding to accompany his brother, the Geledi marched out to meet the Bimaal at Cagaaran, at town beside Merca. The two forces would enter a fierce engagement, the Geledi initially tiding the battle in their favor, however, the Geledi would eventually lose to the Bimaals, and the Geledi Sultan's army would be routed. Killing both Sultan Ahmed and his brother Abobokur in battle.

Upon seeing the bodies of the dead noble men, the women of the Merca reportedly marveled at the beauty of Ahmed Yusuf and his brother, which resulted in a public uproar with them demanding a proper funeral for the late Sultan.

==== Haji Ali Majeerteen ====
Haji Ali Majeerteen arrived in Merca and formed an alliance with the Bimaal clan. He settled in the area near Merca with the consent of the Bimaal clan and began his Dawah activities and education programs. It is established that Ali had secret plans for himself to form a colony at the port of Mungiya, the point where Shabelle River was closest to the Indian Ocean coast, and had obtained permission from Sultan Yusuf of the Geledi to do so. However, initially, he attempted to play the role of a peacemaker between Sultan Yusuf and the Bimaal clan in their conflict, sending a letter to Sultan Yusuf requesting him that he accepts his reconciliation proposal. The Sultan, upon hearing of the proposal refused the offer, feeling disrespected that a newcomer would interfere with his internal affairs. Haji Ali was furious and in response declared war against the Geledi and his men raided a string villages near the capital of the Geledi, Afgooye. This included the coastal city of Barawa. Yusuf and the Geledi army confronted Haji Ali's well armed followers which mainly hailed from the Majeerteen tribe, and annihilated them in battle. Munginya was burnt to the ground and Haji Ali's ambitious dreams ended.

==== Haji Ali’s response ====
Haji Ali penned a letter he sent to the people of Barawa on the Banaadir coast, in that he considered the Geledi Sultanate a polity adhering to a deviated sect, (Firqa Al-Dalah). According to him, this deviation had to be stamped out through either Dawah or ultimate Jihad.

Following his defeat against the Sultans of the Geledi, Sheikh Ali stated that

"In reality, our [death], if you are among the deviated sect which Sultan Yusuf leads, there is no relation between us, and your blood will not be saved from us."

— Haji Ali Majeerteen

The hardline stance of Haji Ali, to the propagation of Islam among his people, his mobilization of armed followers, and his siding with the Bimaal clan against Geledi Sultanate displays the militant ideology akin to the Bardera Jama, and the new Wahhabi tendency that was emerging across the Muslim world at the time.

== Bureaucracy ==
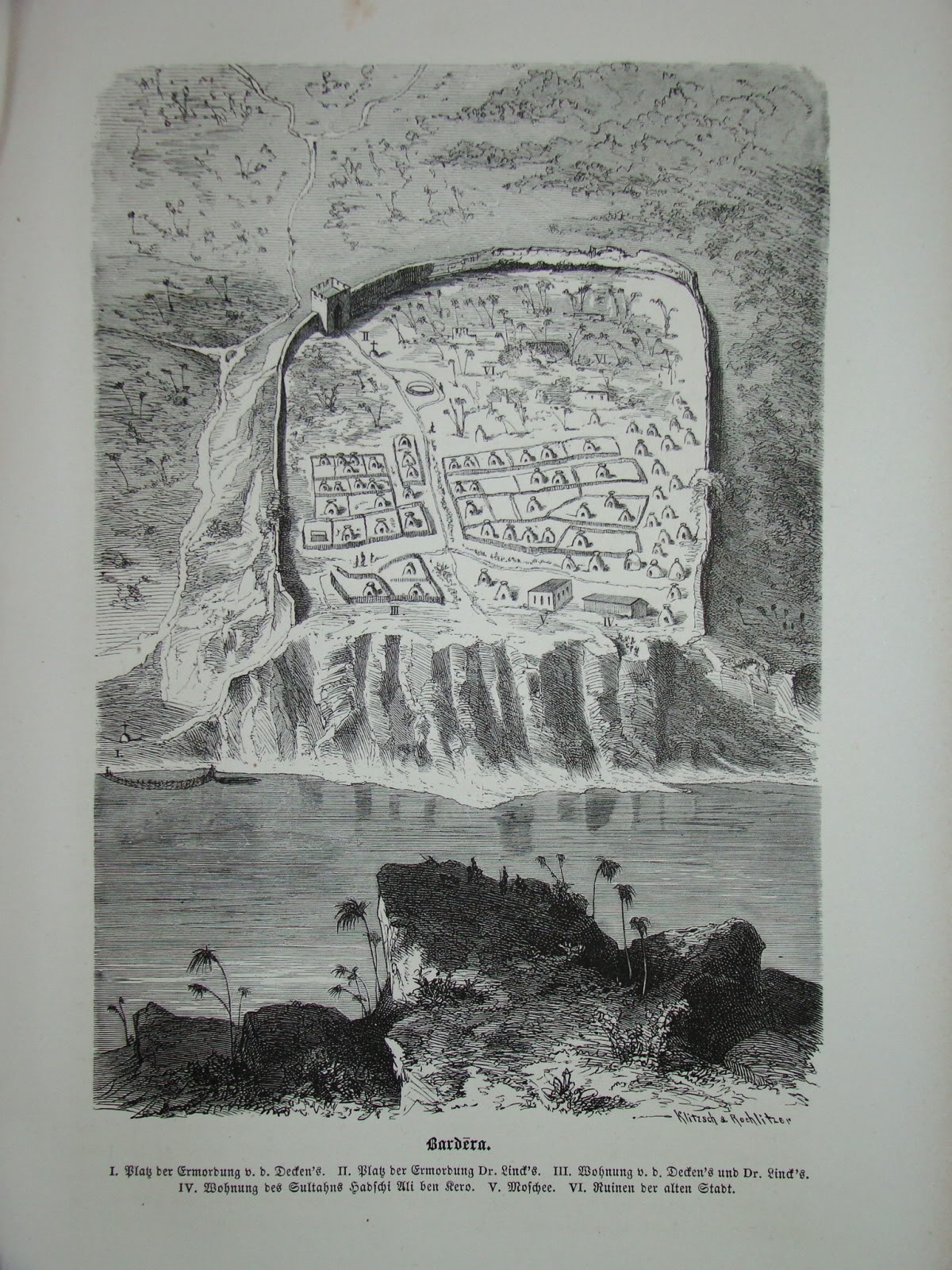
View of the Bardera Citadel in the mid 1800s by Baron Karl Klaus von der Decken.

The Sultanate of Geledi exerted a strong centralized authority during its existence and possessed all of the institutions and trappings of an integrated modern state: a functioning bureaucracy, a hereditary nobility, titled aristocrats, a taxing system, conducting foreign policy, a state flag as well as a standing army. The great sultanate also maintained written records of their activities which still exist in museums.

The Geledi Sultanate's capital city was at Afgooye where the rulers resided. The kingdom had a number of castles forts with a variety of different architectures in various areas within its realm, including a fortress at Luuq and a citadel at Bardera.

Charles Guillain's caravan expedition in 1848, meeting members of the Geledi clan, departing from Mogadishu.

At its height, the Sultanate covered all Rahanweyn territories within present-day Somalia, alongside minor territories in modern day Somali Galbeed. This is what some refer to as the Geledi confederacy. The confederacy was not only confined to Digil and Mirifle but incorporated other Somalis such as Bimaal, Sheekhaal, and Wacdaan. To reign such a diverse Sultanate, the rulers promoted a policy of indirect and flexible administration. They allowed the tribal chiefs, Imams, Sheikhs (religious figures), and Akhiyaars (notable elders) of the community to play significant roles in the administration of the Sultanate. The Geledi rulers were not only the political head of the Sultanate but also considered religious leaders. Akhiyaars were elders who would reconcile and solve cases such as murders and recite Al-Fatiha after adjudication. Between two different lineages groups if an injustice was committed then a googol meeting was held between the Akhiyaar of both.

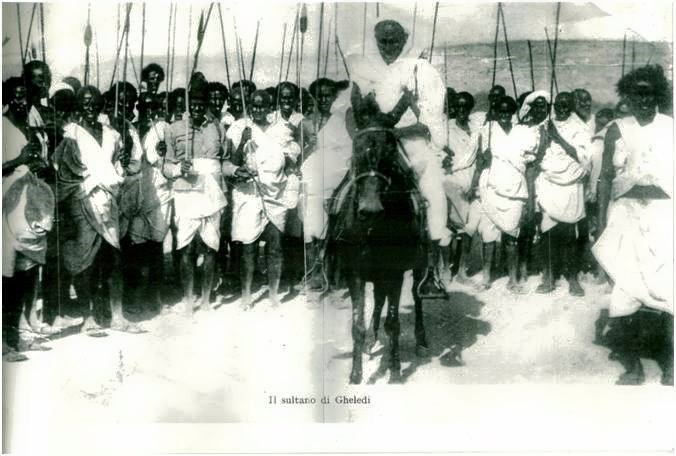
Sultan Osman Ahmed (mounted) and his mamluk soldiers

The Sultan would have a regular guard consisting of armed slaves to protect him from those who wished harm. The Ul Hay would be his intermediaries between the Geledi sub lineages and received his directions and intentions on matters. The symbol of the Sultan's authority was his turban. It would be placed on his head by leading elders of the Abiikarow lineage.

Clear devolution of power was also present within the politics of the Geledi Sultan delegating certain regions of the sultanate to be managed by close relatives, who wielded significant influence in their own right. Sultan Ahmed Yusuf's administration was described as such by the British Parliament.

The Somali tribe of Ruhwaina. The Chief of this and other tribes behind Brava, Marka and Mogdisho is Ahmed Yusuf, who resides at Galhed, one day's march or less from the latter town. Two days further inland is Dafert, a large town governed by Aweka Haji, his brother. These are the principal towns of the Ruhwaina. At four, five, and six hours respectively from Marka lie the towns of Golveen (Golweyn), Bulo Mareerta, and Addormo, governed by Abobokur Yusuf, another brother who though nominally under the orders of the first-named chief, levies black-mail on his own account, and negotiates with the governors of Marka and Brava direct. He resides with about 2,000 soldiers principally slaves at Bulo Mareta; the towns of Gulveen which he often visits and Addormo being occupied by somalis growing produce, cattle &c. and doing a large trade with Marka. The brother of Sultan Ahmed Yusuf, Abobokur Yusuf managed the lands opposite the Banadir ports of Brava & Marka and also received a tribute from Brava. This Abobokur Yusuf was accustomed to send messengers to Brava for tribute, and he drew thence about 2,000 dollars per annum.

During the Scramble for Africa period between the 1880s and the first World War, Geledi was bounded to the north by the Huwan Region, to the east by Hobyo Sultanate and Italian leasing of Benadir, and to the south by the British East Africa Protectorate. (Note: For peer reviews on Jama Omar Issa, see the 113 peer reviews under spelling "jaamac cumar ciise" on google scholar link.)

== Economy ==
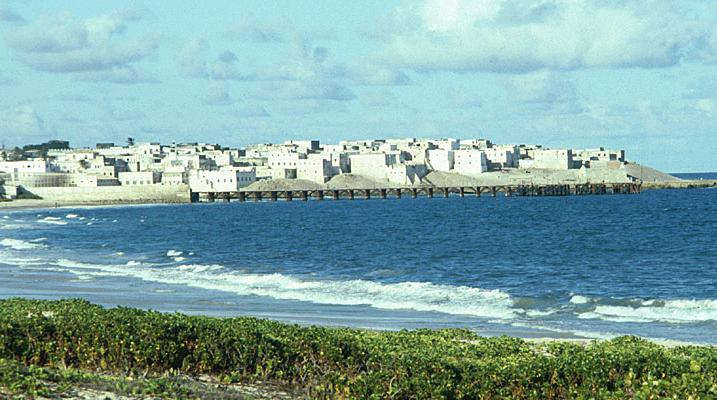
Barawa was the chief port and Islamic center for the Geledi Sultanate.

The Geledi Sultanate maintained a vast trading network, and had trade relations with Arabia, Persia, India, Near East, Europe and the Swahili coast, dominating the East African trade, and minting its own currency, and were recognized as a powerful regional power.

In the case of the Geledi, wealth accrued to the nobles and to the Sultanate, not only from the market cultivation which it had utilized from the Shebelle and Jubba valleys, but also trade from their involvement in the slave trade and other enterprises such as ivory, cotton, iron, gold, and among many other commodities. Generally, they also raised livestock animals such as cattle, sheep, goats, and chickens.

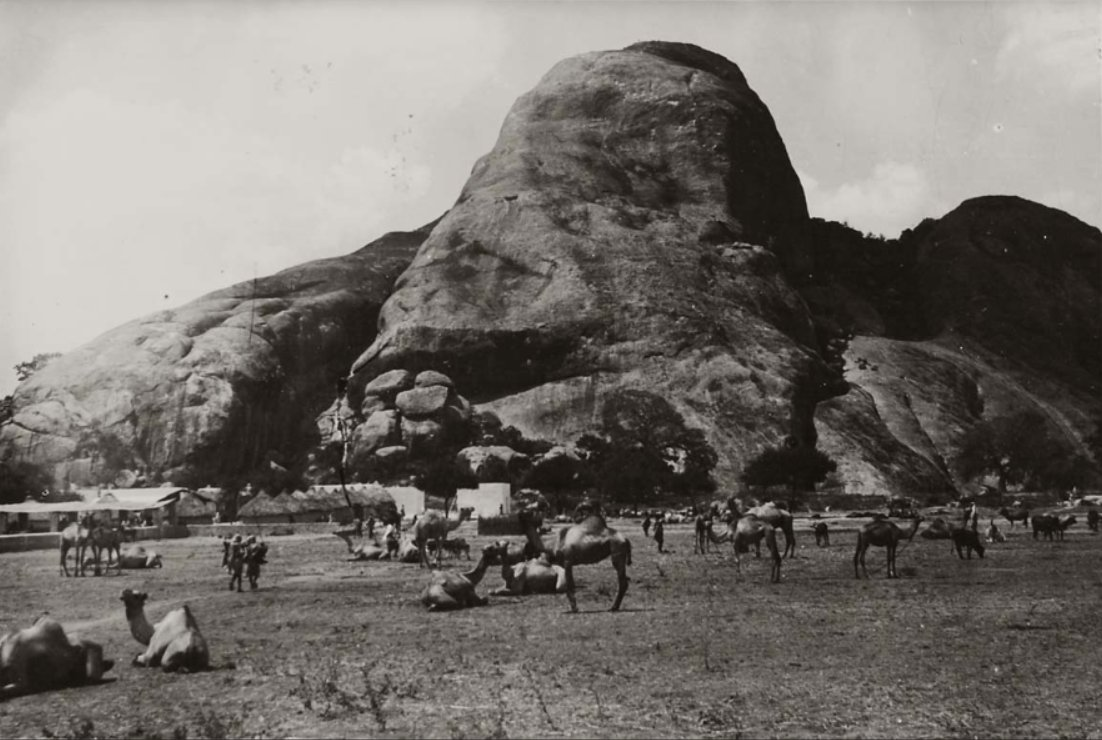
Buur Hakaba in the 20th century

By the beginning of the nineteenth century, the Gobroon dynasty had turned their religious prestige into formidable political power and were recognized as the rulers of an increasingly centralized and wealthy state. As already mentioned, much of their wealth was based on control over the fertile riverine lands. Using slave labour obtained through the coastal ports, the Geledi gradually shifted their economic base away from its traditional dependency on pastoralism and subsistence agriculture to one built largely on plantation agriculture and production of cash crops such as grain, cotton, maize, sorghum, and a variety of fruits and vegetables, especially bananas, mangos, sugarcane, cotton, tomatoes, squash and much more. The region is traversed by historic caravan routes. Trade on the rivers themselves connected with the coast to the interior markets. During this period, the Somali agricultural output to Arabian markets was so great that the coast of South Somalia came to be known as the Grain Coast of Yemen and Oman.

Afgooye, the headquarters of the Sultanate, was an extremely wealthy and large city. Afgooye had some thriving industries such as weaving, shoemaking, tableware, jewellery, pottery and produced various products. Afgooye was the crossroads of caravans bringing ostrich feathers, leopard skins, and aloe in exchange for foreign fabrics, sugar, dates and firearms. They raised numerous livestock animals for meat, milk and ghee. The farmers of Afgooye produced large quantity of fruits and vegetables.

Afgooye merchants would boast of their wealth; one of their wealthiest said

Moordiinle iyo mereeyey iyo mooro lidow, maalki jeri keenow kuma moogi malabside. Bring all the wealth of Moordiinle, Mereeyey, and the enclosures of lidow, I scarcely notice it.

== Military ==
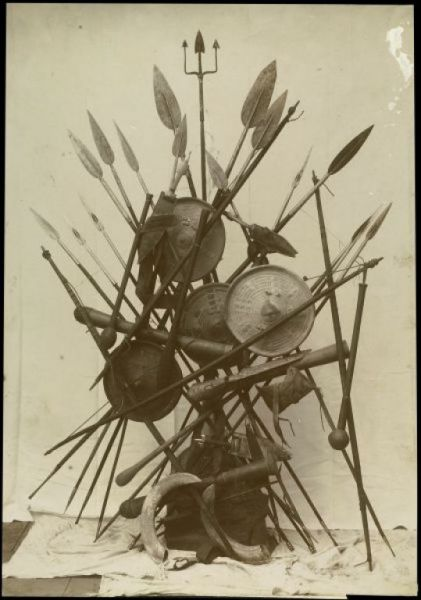
Traditional weapons and tools of the Geledi/Rahanweyn

The Geledi army numbered around 20,000 men in times of peace, with a maximum of 50,000 troops in times of war. The supreme commanders of the army were the Sultan and his brother, who in turn had Malaakhs and Garads under them. The military was supplied with rifles and cannons by Somali traders of the coastal regions that controlled the East African arms trade.

The best horse breeds were raised in Luuq and later sent to the army after maturity. They would be used mainly for military purposes, and numerous stone fortifications were erected to provide shelter for the army in the interior and coastal districts. In each province, the soldiers were under the supervision of a military commander known as a Malaakh, and the coastal areas and the Indian Ocean trade were protected by a powerful navy.

== Society ==
The Geledi society is divided into three segments: nobles, commoners, and slaves (to use terms adopted by Helander). Each of these castes consist of several lineage groups whose federation formed the Geledi state; the lineages are divided between two moieties. Tolweyne and Yebdaale, each living in its section of the city. The nobles, in the old society, were the ruling group but depended on the support of the commoner lineages.

=== Nobility ===
The noble section of the society belonged to rulers. However, all members of the Geledi clan were also considered to be of noble stock despite the majority of them not being rulers. Nobility was not only exclusive to the Geledi clan as there were rulers of many districts in the Geledi realm that didn't belong to the Geledi lineage.

=== Commoners ===
The commoners were typical citizens that mainly consist of non-Geledi Somalis and traditionally consist of urban dwellers, farmers, pastoral nomads as well as officials, merchants, engineers, scholars, soldiers, craftsmen, port workers, and other various professions. The commoners were the majority in the kingdom and were treated as equals.

=== Slaves ===
The slaves were mostly of Bantu origin and were used for labour. The men would work as agricultural labourers led by their farmer-owners and some would work in construction led by engineers. They would also be employed into the army and were separated from the rest of the Geledi army and were branched as Mamaluks meaning slave soldiers. The women would work as domestic servants and perform a variety of household services for their owners, from providing, cooking, cleaning, and laundry, taking care of children and elderly dependents, and other household errands. They would also be looked down upon for any kind of sexual contact and were deemed as unattractive.

The Bantus were not exclusive to slavery. Oromos would sometimes be enslaved following raids and wars. However, there were marked differences in terms of the perception, capture, treatment, and duties of the Oromo versus the Bantu slaves. On an individual basis, Oromo subjects were not viewed as racially inferior by their Somali captors. Despite Oromos taking the same roles as the Bantus, they were not treated the same. The most fortunate of the men worked as the officials or bodyguards of the ruler and emirs, or as business managers for rich merchants. They enjoyed significant personal freedom and occasionally held slaves of their own. Prized for their beauty and viewed as legitimate sexual partners, many Oromo women became either wives or concubines of their Somali owners, while others became domestic servants. The most beautiful ones often enjoyed a wealthy lifestyle and became mistresses of the elite or even mothers to rulers.

== Rulers ==
Detailed biographies of the Sultanate's rulers

#	Sultan	Reign	Notes
1	Ibrahim Adeer	late 17th century–mid 18th century	Founded the Geledi Sultanate after defeating the Ajuran Sultanate. First ruler in the Gobroon dynasty.
2	Mahamud Ibrahim	mid-18th–1828	Consolidated Goobron power, incorporated the Murusade as allies and ended the Silcis threat.
3	Yusuf Mahamud Ibrahim	1828–1848	Rule marked the start of the golden age of the Geledis. Destroyed the Bardhera Jama'a and revolutionized the Geledi economy. Collected tribute from Said bin Sultan ruler of the Omani Empire
4	Ahmed Yusuf	1848–1878	Defended the Banadir coast from incursion and reestablished Gobroon power after his father's defeat in 1848
5	Osman Ahmed	1878-1910	Inherited throne from father. Reign marked the end of the Geledi Sultanate. Decisively defeated the Abyssinians at the Battle of Luuq and the Dervish at the Battle of Hudur.

== Legacy ==
The Sultanate left a rich legacy behind which continues to live on in popular memory and poetry composed about the powerful Sultans and other noble figures during the period. One notable poem was recorded by Virginia Luling in 1989 during her visit to Afgooye. Geledi laashins (poets) sang about the ever present issue of land theft by the Somali government. Sultan Subuge was asked to help the community and was reminded of his legendary Gobroon forefathers of the centuries prior.

The law then was not this law was performed by the leading laashins of Afgooye, Hiraabey, Muuse Cusmaan and Abukar Cali Goitow alongside a few others, addressed to the current leader Sultan Subuge .

Here the richest selection of the poem performed by Goitow

Ganaane gubow gaala guuriow Gooble maahinoo Geelidle ma goynin
Gembi iyo waran guraantiis aa loogu soo gayooday, Gooble
Gacalkiisa guri curad aa looga soo guuray Haddana nin walba aa
Soo gamgamohaayo, goofka beereed waa la goostay, gelgeshii
Gaashada daaqeysana waa la goostay, gunta intee la geyn doonaa?
Gobroontii soo gaartay Gobroontaan ma ahayn, gargooye Ibraahim
Cumar Xaaji goodaalka adunyada markii joogeen, Awow Gaduud Cali -
Mahinoo - Awow Gaduud Cali Abukar, Yusuf Maxamuud iyo goodaalka
Addunka markii joogeen, ganuunka ganuunkan ma ahayn, Awow
Gudgudoome Cumar Adeerow goodaalka aduunka markii joogeen
Ganuunka ganuunkan ma ahayn. Beereed waa la goostay, gelgeshii
Gaasha la la goostay, gaasha intee loola guuraa ?

Ganaane gubowow, gaala guuriow-aa
Gelgeshii la goostay go'aan maad ka gaart-aa (gaartay) ?

— Abubakr Cali Goitow The law then was not this law
Translation:

You who burnt Ganaane and chased away the infidels
Did you not separate from the Geelidle and come to Gooble (Afgooye)?
We endured war and the point of the spear
For the love of Gooble we left our first home
And now everyone crowds in here, they have taken our cleared farmland
They have taken the pasture where the herds grazed - where will the people be led ?
The Gobroon who first arrived here are not these Gobroon
When the giver of judgment Ibraahim Cumar Xaaji the pillar of the world was alive and Aw Gaduud Cali
Is it not so ? - Aw Gaduud Cali Abukar, and Yusuf Maxamuud the pillar of the world
While they were alive the law was not this law
When the giver of decisions Aw Cumar Adeerow was in the world the law was not this law
Now everyone crowds in, they have taken the cleared farmland,
They have taken the pasture of the herds where will we move the herds?

You who burnt Ganaane and chased away the infidels
Have you reached a decision about the stolen pastures?

== See also ==
- Ajuran Sultanate
- Hiraab Imamate
- History of Somalia
- List of Sunni Muslim dynasties
