= Ahmed Yusuf Mahamud =

Sultan of the Geledi (r. 1848–1878)

Ahmed Yusuf Mahamud أحمد يوسف محمود

Sultan of the Geledi
- Reign: 1848–1878
- Predecessor: Yusuf Mahamud Ibrahim
- Successor: Osman Ahmed
- Born: Afgooye, Sultanate of the Geledi (now Somalia)
- Died: 1878; Agaaran, Sultanate of the Geledi
- Dynasty: Gobroon Dynasty
- Religion: Islam

Ahmed Yusuf Mahamud (Somali: Axmed Yuusuf Maxamuud, Arabic: أحمد يوسف محمود) was a Somali Sultan of the Geledi sultanate, reigning from 1848 to 1878 and succeeding his father Yusuf Mahamud after his demise at the battle of Adaddey Suleyman. Ahmed was crowned as the fourth Sultan, and his rule marked a period of great prosperity in the Sultanate. The Sultan is credited as having brought over 20,000 Somali troops to free the slaves of Zanzibar.

== Early life ==
Ahmed was born in the town of Afgooye, where he stayed until the age of seven. His father, Yusuf, subsequently sent him to Qur'anic schools in Barawa for studies under the tutelage of some of the leading Qadiriyya Sheikhs in Somalia. Barawa had developed into the heart of Islamic learning in southern Somalia and notables from all over would travel to the city to learn from its Sufi masters.

== Reign ==
Ahmed Yusuf was one of the most powerful rulers in East Africa and had 50,000 troops at his command and controlled a vast territory from stretching Mogadishu to the Jubba region. On the Benadir coast the potential power lay in the hands of Ahmed Yusuf, ruler of the Geledi Sultanate, who lived one day's march inland from Mogadishu. Sultan Ahmed exerted influence over the clans that inhabited the interiverine region. The lucrative ivory trade continued to flourish under his reign that ran from Luuq to Mogadishu. He also collected tribute from the concentrated agricultural clans along the lower Shabelle valley as far south as Kismayo. Only the powerful Bimaal clan centered in Merca resisted Geledi hegemony.

British explorer John Kirk in his 1873 visit to the region noted a variety of things. Roughly 20 large dhows were docked in both Mogadishu and Merka respectively filled with grain produced from the farms of the Geledi in the interior. Kirk met the Hiraab Imam Mahmood who reigned over Mogadishu. The Shabelle river itself was referred to as the 'Geledi river' by Kirk, perhaps in respect of the sheer volume of produce that the Sultanate output. In Barawa there was little grain instead a large quantity of ivory and skins which had already been loaded onto ships destined for Zanzibar.

Following Barawa locals being defeated by an expansionist push by a cunning Somali merchant from Kismayo, Sultan Ahmed intervened and defeated the invading forces and pursued them back to Kismayo, keeping the Banadir coast and Shabelle river free from outside penetration.

== Administration ==
Sultan Ahmed Yusuf's devolved administration described as such by the British Parliament in 1876. Noted as a powerful ruler of the Rahanweyn, his brother Abobokur Yusuf was the governor of the lands opposite the southern Banadir coast. Abobokur collected a 2,000 dollar tax from Barawa annually on behalf of Ahmed and the towns of Golweyn, and Bulo Mareer were exceedingly prosperous. Ahmed himself lived at Afgooye. Other relatives of the Sultan managed the vast territories outside of the immediate interior of the Banadir coast.

== Cultural contributions ==
The Istunka tournament was developed in the Ajuran period, and was celebrated subsequently each year during the Somali new year alongside other festivals such as Nowruz. It was not until the Geledi sultanate and the reign of Sultan Ahmed Yusuf that the martial art festival became a centralized tournament with separate teams each supported by an assembly of poets, female vocalists and dance groups throughout the duration of the contest.

== Battle of Agaaran ==
After preparations were made to finally defeat the Bimal, Ahmed's brother Abobokur Yusuf warned him not to go through with the attack as the Geledi had an influential ally refuse to join the upcoming campaign. Reprimanding his brother, the Sultan said he could watch the women & children then. With Abobokur eventually deciding to accompany Ahmed the Geledi marched out to meet the Bimaal at Cagaaran near Merca. A fierce battle commenced, with the Geledi eventually gaining the upperhand. The Bimals used asraar magic to turn the tide and would rout the Sultan's army killing both Ahmed and Abobokur. Following the battle, their bodies were taken to Merca by the Bimal, where they were then displayed in front of a large crowd as a show of triumph. The Bimal Sultan praised both men as noble and courageous. Upon seeing the bodies of the dead men, the women of the Merca reportedly marveled at the beauty of Ahmed Yusuf and his brother, which resulted in a public uproar with them demanding a proper funeral for the late Sultan.

== See also ==
- Somali aristocratic and court titles
- Mogadishu
- Rahanweyn
- Barawa

== Notes ==
Preceded by Yusuf Mahamud Ibrahim	Geledi sultanate	Succeeded by Osman Ahmed
