= Afgooye =

Afgooye أفجويى Afgoi
- Town
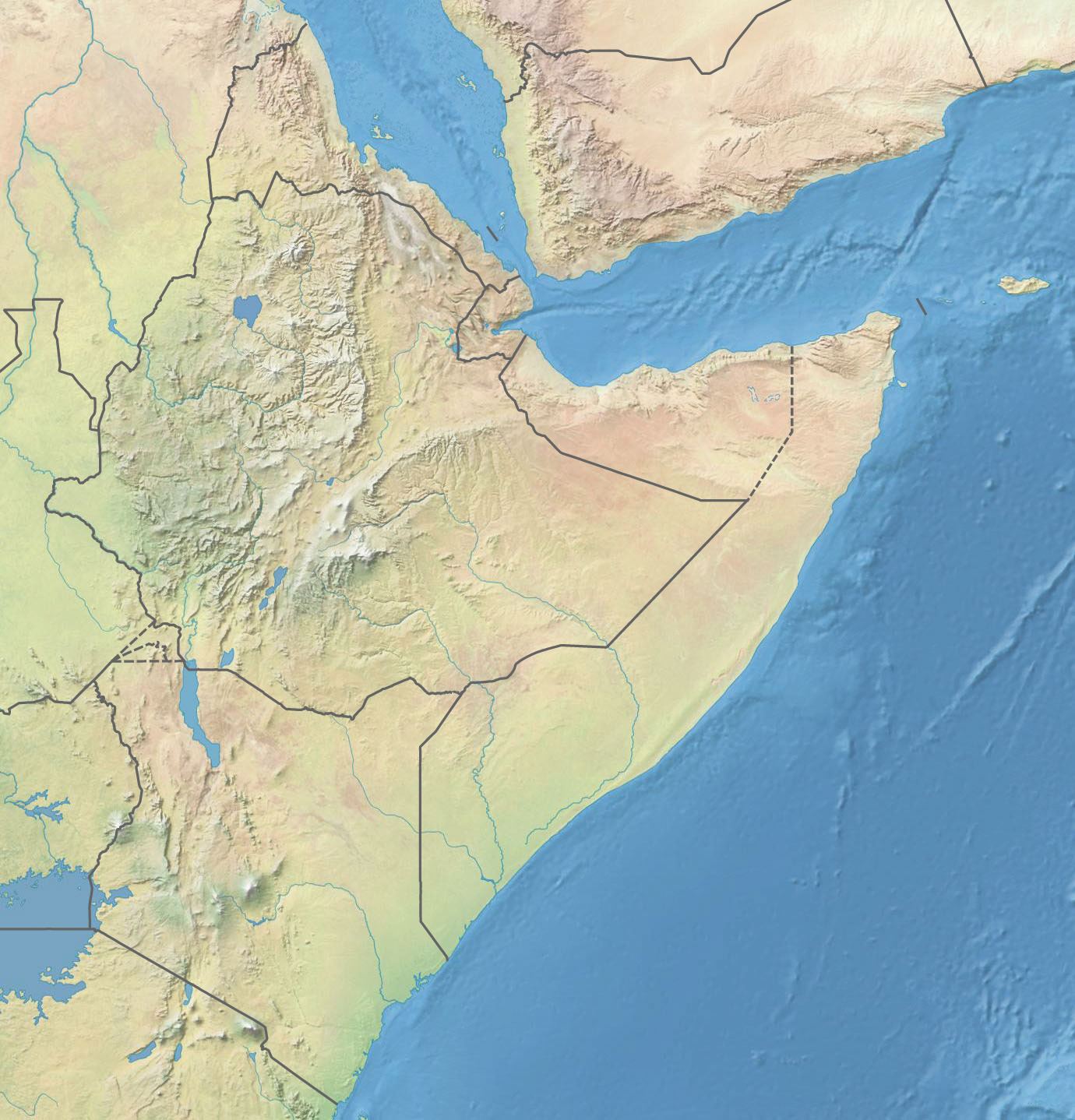
- Location within Somalia Location within the Horn of Africa Location within Africa
- Coordinates: 2°8′28.6″N 45°7′1″E
- Country: Somalia
- State: South West
- Region: Lower Shabelle
- District: Afgooye

Government
  - Mayor: Mohamed Hussein Elmi

Population
  - Total: 79,400
- Time zone: UTC+3 (EAT)
- Area code: +252-61

Afgooye (Somali: Afgooye, Arabic: أفجويى, Italian: Afgoi) is a town in the southeastern Somalia Lower Shebelle (Shabellaha Hoose) region of Somalia.The town is identified with the historical settlement of Lama Jiidle, which Lee V. Cassanelli describes as the centre of Silcis administration. It is the center of the Afgooye District. Afgooye is the third largest city of Southwest State. Afgooye is one of the oldest towns on the lower Shebelle valley, 30 kilometers north of Mogadishu. Afgooye is the site of Lafoole college, the first college of education in Somalia, built on the site of the battle of Lafoole of 1896. Afgooye is also known for the Istunka, the annual "stick fight" carnival commemorating the New Year in the riverine region. It was a trade center for the Silcis Dynasty in the medieval period then fell under Ajuran rule. Around the late 17th century, Afgooye became the capital of Geledi Sultanate.

== Etymology ==
In the Somali language, Afgooye translates to split mouth or open/ split closing.

== Location ==
It is situated about 30 kilometres west of Mogadishu, the capital of Somalia. The Shabelle River passes through the middle of the town.

== History ==
=== Medieval Period ===
The Silcis Dynasty were a section of Ajuran that governed the Afgooye district. Neither the Silcis nor the Ajuran developed the town, but limited themselves to controlling the caravan routes and collecting taxes and tribute. The Silcis center of power was in Lama Jiidle (present day Afgooye). Lama Jiidle means "two roads" in Somali.

The Silcis imposed taxation on their subject clans, such as the Wacdaan, a fellow subclan of the Gurgate Hawiye, and the Geledi, a Rahanweyn subclan. According to Virginia Luling, "The Sil'is imposed their dominion on the Geledi, who had to pay as tribute a measure (suus) of grain every day from each household; it was collected and loaded on a camel, others say a donkey. A tax was also imposed on those who brought their stock to water at the river”. Barile also describes the taxes levied by the Silcis.

The final ruler of the Silcis in Lama Jiidle (Afgooye) was the sultan 'Umur Abukar Abroone. According to Luling, "His daughter Imbia used to go round collecting the daily tribute of grain, accompanied by her slaves" from her father's Wacdaan and Geledi subjects. Oral accounts hold that one day, "when the Sultan's daughter came round to collect the tribute, she got a beating instead of the grain", as the Geledi refused to pay. When Imbia reported this event to her father, he exclaimed "waa la i afgooye", literally "they have cut off my mouth", meaning that the regime's source of provision had been terminated. Lama Jiidle's name became Afgooye to commemorate this victory over the Silcis.

The Geledi mobilized and under Ibrahim Adeer a general who used to serve the Ajuran drove the Silcis out of Afgooye and established the Geledi Sultanate.

=== Early Modern ===
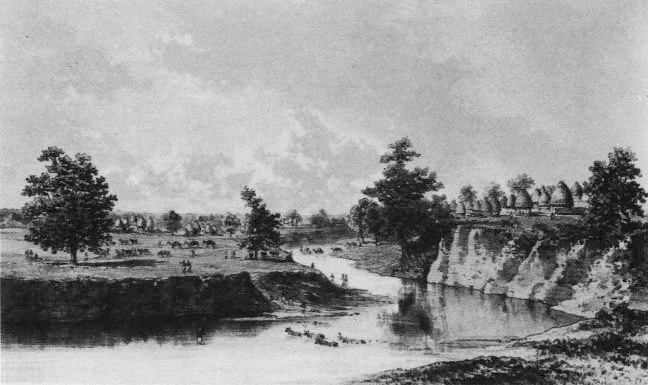
Farming village near Afgooye on the Shabelle river

Afgooye was in its golden age in the early modern period under the reign of the Gobroon dynasty which was not only a powerful military machine but, by its use of Asraar or Ta'daar the feared "secret mystical language" was a formidable force in other respects as well. Afgooye at that time was a trading hub center controlling the trade route between the coast and interior. All roads were linked to Afgooye which gave the city immense leverage. During the early 19th century, the city's population was estimated to have exceeded 80,000 making it one of the largest cities in East Africa of that time. The city was surrounded by a large wall with five fortified gates. It had many complex structures such as multi-story high buildings, big palaces in the center, mosques, residential houses, shops, roads, and bridges. They also built an advanced plumbing system, a drainage system, and a sewage system. The city was very vibrant and developed in its time.

The Sultanate ruled most of the inter-riverine region and Benadir coast. Its headquarters was located in Afgooye which was an extremely wealthy and large city. Afgooye having some thriving industries such as weaving, shoemaking, tableware, jewellery, pottery and produced other various products. Afgooye was the crossroads of caravans bringing ivory, leopard skins, and aloe in exchange for foreign fabrics, sugar, dates, and firearms. Afgooyans also traded livestock and slaves. The outside inhabitants of Afgooye grew sorghum, beans, cotton, bananas, and a variety of fruits and vegetables. The Afgooyans say "Laka Beere beerwaye" (you can count on your farm), as opposed to the nomads who counted their camels. Afgooyans raised cows, goats, sheep, and chicken for meat, milk, and ghee. It is said that every household in Afgooye was wealthy and you could not find a single poor person.

Afgooye merchants boasted their wealth; one of their wealthiest said

Moordiinle iyo Mereeyey iyo mooro lidow, maalki jeri keenow kuma moogi malabside.

Bring all the wealth of Moordiinle, Mereeyey, and the enclosures of lidow, I scarcely notice it.

=== Italian Somaliland ===
At the turn of the 20th century, Afgooye was incorporated into Italian Somaliland. The Italians occupied the town in 1908 and in the process abolished the local slave market. There was also a station in Afgooye on the Mogadishu-Villabruzzi Railway, which connected the town to the capital Mogadishu.

=== Modern ===
In the 1980s, Afgooye was a common destination for investors from the Gulf States. The Emir of Kuwait also reportedly used to visit the town during the holy month of Ramadan.

After the outbreak of the civil war in 1991, parts of the town became a place of refuge for many of southern Somalia's internally displaced people.

On May 25, 2012, Somali government forces backed by AMISOM tanks re-captured Afgooye from Al-Shabaab, which had established a base in the area.

== Istunka Afgooye Festival ==
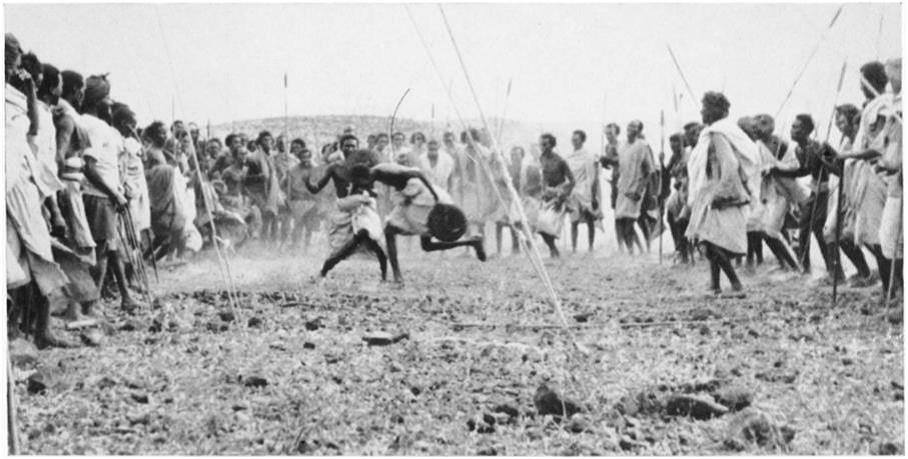
The Istunka participants in mock combat

Istunka, also known as isgaraac, was the name for annual mock combat festival in Afgooye, which marks the new year and one of the best known tourist attractions in the region.

The festival was developed during the medieval Ajuran period. It was later expanded upon by Sultan Ahmed Yusuf (Gobroon) becoming a centralized tournament separate teams were established, each supported by an assembly of poets, female vocalists and dance groups throughout the duration of the contest.

In the modern era, the festival evolved into a local attraction; particularly during the 1970s and 80s. It is still practised annually in the town.

== Demographics ==
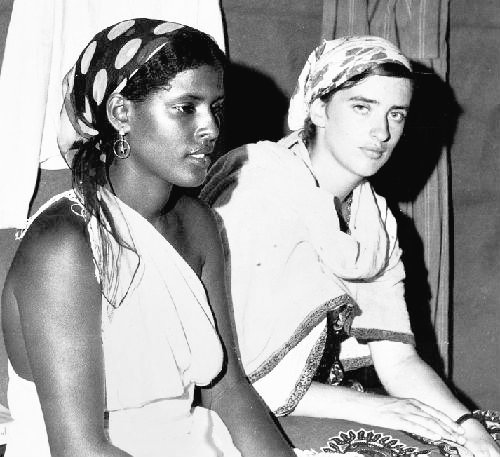
British ethnologist Virginia Luling with a Somali woman in Afgooye in 1967

Afgooye has a population of around 79,400 inhabitants. The broader Afgooye District has a total population of 135,012 residents. Afgooye District is predominantly inhabited by the Geledi and Garre clans with a small minority of Begedi clan all sub-clans of Digil/Rahanweyn.

== Geodesy ==
Afgooye is a geodetic datum used in Somalia. Afgooye datum is based on the Krasovsky ellipsoid and the Greenwich prime meridian.

== Notable residents ==
- Abdullahi Issa, Prime Minister of the Trust Territory of Somalia
- Mohamed Osman Jawari, Speaker of the Federal Parliament of Somalia
- Mustafa Mohamed Moalim, Chief of the Somali Air Force School and Operations
