= Clan cleansing of the Rahanweyn =

Mass killings and famine targeting the Rahanweyn clans during the Somali Civil War

- Part of Somali Civil War
- Location: Bay, Bakool, Lower Shabelle, Gedo, Somalia
- Date: 1991–1995
- Target: Rahanweyn (Digil and Mirifle clans)
- Attack type: Clan cleansing, Massacre, Starvation, Man made famines, Crimes against humanity
- Deaths: Estimated 200,000–500,000
- Perpetrators: Somali National Front, United Somali Congress

The Clan cleansing of the Rahanweyn was the mass violence, clan cleansing, starvation, and forced displacement that targeted the Rahanweyn clans during the early 1990s in the Somali Civil War. Rival militias, mainly the Somali National Front (SNF), led by General Mohamed Said Hersi Morgan, and the United Somali Congress (USC) under Mohamed Farrah Aidid, fought for control of southern Somalia’s fertile inter-riverine regions Bay, Bakool, Lower Shabelle, and parts of Gedo traditionally inhabited by the Rahanweyn (Digil and Mirifle subclans). During the conflict this region was labeled a Triangle of Death. The conflict caused the deaths of an estimated 200,000 to 500,000 people, largely from starvation and violence.

== Background ==
The Rahanweyn clans form a distinct Somali group with unique linguistic and cultural characteristics, primarily agro-pastoralists inhabiting southern Somalia’s fertile river valleys such as the Jubba river, and Shabelle river.

Under Siad Barre’s authoritarian regime, (1969–1991), the Rahanweyn were politically marginalized and economically disadvantaged. Barre’s government favored the much larger Darod and Hawiye Somali clans, particularly in the military and government sectors.

Documents leaked in the late 1980s revealed plans by Barre and his son-in-law, General Mohamed Said Hersi Morgan, to displace and weaken the Rahanweyn and Isaaq clans to consolidate Darod control over fertile regions.

== Prelude ==
The Somali Rebellion, which began in the late 1970s and intensified throughout the 1980s, was a nationwide armed resistance against the military regime of President Siad Barre. It was primarily led by clan based opposition groups such as the Somali National Movement (SNM) in the north, the United Somali Congress (USC) in the central regions, and the Somali Patriotic Movement (SPM) in the south. These groups were largely drawn from clans that felt politically and economically excluded by Barre's Marehan-dominated government.

As the Barre regime began to lose control in the late 1980s, opposition militias started to expand into southern Somalia. The fertile inter-riverine regions of Bay, Bakool, and Lower Shabelle, home to the Rahanweyn clans became highly contested. These areas were viewed as valuable due to their agricultural productivity and strategic importance. Fighting between Darod and Hawiye militias increasingly took place on Rahanweyn land, turning their communities into battlegrounds.

== Clan cleansing ==
After Barre’s fall in 1991, Somalia fragmented into clan-based militias fighting for territorial control. The SNF and USC militias aggressively expanded into Rahanweyn lands, using violence, massacre, and intimidation to displace the indigenous population.

=== Massacres and human rights abuses ===
Reports by Amnesty International and Human Rights Watch documented widespread killing, sexual violence and looting committed by SNF and USC militias against Rahanweyn civilians, including deliberate targeting of women and children.

=== Deliberate starvation ===
A key tactic was systematic starvation of the Rahanweyn population. Militias blockaded humanitarian aid, looted food supplies, and destroyed crops. This famine (1992 Somali Famine) resulted in the deaths of hundreds of thousands in southern Somalia.

The Triangle of Death

The Triangle of Death refers to the inter‑riverine zones of southern Somalia—Bay, Bakool, and Lower Shabelle that suffered catastrophic famine and conflict in the early 1990s.

During this period, armed militias—including the SNF and USC—looted farmlands, destroyed irrigation systems, and disrupted agricultural production across the region. These actions crippled food supply chains and led to widespread hunger.

The city of Baidoa emerged as the region’s epicenter of famine and deprivation. Widely referred to as the "City of Death," it is estimated that dozens to hundreds of people died daily in the early 1990s. Bodies were commonly left abandoned along roadsides, and in some cases, buried in mass graves.

A CDC mortality survey in Baidoa during 1992 recorded one of the highest death rates ever documented in famine contexts, highlighting the region’s acute vulnerability and the devastating human toll inflicted by both man-made and natural disasters.

=== Occupation and land seizure ===
Following the violence, militias settled their own clan members in Rahanweyn territories, disrupting traditional land tenure and forcing many Rahanweyn into displacement and poverty.

== Resistance and aftermath ==
In response, the Rahanweyn formed the Rahanweyn Resistance Army (RRA) in 1995. The RRA conducted military campaigns to reclaim their ancestral lands, successfully expelling hostile militias from Bay, Bakool, and Lower Shabelle regions by the late 1990s.

The RRA’s efforts culminated in the establishment of the South West State of Somalia in 2002, an autonomous federal state representing Rahanweyn interests and contributing to regional stability.

== Death toll ==
Reliable estimates vary, but humanitarian agencies and scholars estimate that between 200,000 and 500,000 Rahanweyn people died due to the violence, famine, and displacement in this period.

== Legacy ==
The clan cleansing of the Rahanweyn is less internationally recognized than other Somali clan conflicts, but Somali scholars and community leaders emphasize its historical significance and ongoing need for justice and reconciliation.

== See also ==
- Isaaq genocide
- Clan cleansing in Somalia
