= Clan cleansing in Somalia =

Organized violence in the Somali Civil War

- Part of Somali Civil War
- Location: Somalia
- Date: 1987–1989 (Isaaq); 1991–1992 (Darod focus); 1991–1995 (Rahanweyn and War of the Militias)
- Attack type: Clan cleansing, communal violence
- Deaths: Tens to hundreds of thousands
- Perpetrators: State forces and auxiliaries (Siad Barre regime era); USC and allied militias/civilians (1991); various clan militias including SNF and USC factions (War of the Militias)

Clan cleansing was the organized campaigns of violence in the Somali Civil War in which civilians were systematically targeted, killed, raped, humiliated, dispossessed, starved, and expelled on the basis of their clan identity. The term has been used in Somali scholarship, human rights reporting, and political discourse since at least the mid-1990s (first prominently by Jama Mohamed Ghalib in 1995 with reference to north-western events). It describes episodes in which politico-military leaders and militias mobilized clan constructs to justify and carry out large-scale attacks on civilians, often to seize territory, resources, or state power.

Major instances include the state-sponsored violence against Isaaq civilians in the northwest (late 1980s, often also termed the Isaaq genocide), the 1991–1992 campaign targeting Darod-associated civilians in Mogadishu and central and southern Somalia, and the violence against Rahanweyn communities in the inter-riverine regions (early to mid-1990s, accompanied by an engineered famine). These episodes share features of deliberate "othering," organized perpetration, and intent to render areas clan-homogeneous through force, though they differ in state vs. non-state character, scale, and specific political triggers.

Lidwien Kapteijns' 2013 book provides the most detailed historical reconstruction and analytical framework for the 1991–1992 phase, characterizing it as a transformative "key shift" toward communal (neighbor-against-neighbor) violence outside state institutions, driven by clan hate-narratives. Other scholars and reports apply the term more broadly across episodes.

== Isaaq (1987–1989) ==
Under Siad Barre's regime, the northwest (then part of Somalia, now Somaliland) saw systematic state-sponsored violence against Isaaq civilians following the Somali National Movement (SNM) insurgency. This included the creation of special units (e.g., "Dabar Goynta Isaaqa" or Isaaq Exterminators, largely non-Isaaq recruits), aerial bombardment and artillery destruction of Hargeisa (approximately 90% destroyed) and Burao (70% destroyed), widespread landmining of civilian areas and water sources, strafing of fleeing refugees, rape as a weapon, summary executions, and looting.

A 2001 United Nations-commissioned investigation led by Chris Mburu concluded that genocide was committed against the Isaaq people between 1987 and 1989. Death estimates range from 50,000 to 200,000, with up to 500,000 displaced (many to massive refugee camps in Ethiopia, described as one of the fastest and largest forced movements in Africa at the time). The violence was framed by the regime as counter-insurgency but targeted civilians collectively on clan grounds. Early uses of "clan cleansing" in Somali literature (e.g., Ghalib 1995) referred to these north-western events. It is recognized as a form of clan cleansing or genocidal clan-based violence that helped prime later episodes by normalizing large-scale civilian targeting.

== Darod (1991–1992) ==
Following the collapse of the Siad Barre regime and the USC capture of Mogadishu in late December 1990–January 1991, a campaign of clan cleansing targeted civilians associated with the broad genealogical construct of "Darod" (including but far exceeding Barre's inner circle and MOD allies). USC leaders and militias (primarily Hawiye-associated), supported by civilian participants, defined "the Darod" as the mortal enemy to be eliminated and expelled.

Kapteijns identifies this as a "key shift" for three main reasons: the violence occurred largely outside remaining state institutions, with civilians directly perpetrating and suffering intimate communal attacks on neighbors, acquaintances, and in-laws; political entrepreneurs actively rallied and enabled ordinary people to become perpetrators in the name of clan; and the political axis reversed abruptly from regime versus opposition to clan-construct versus clan-construct, with the Darod equated with the hated regime through hate-narratives such as "Faqash," "remnants of Barre," and "one hundred years of Darod domination."

The campaign featured organized elements, including target lists, mid-level direction, and radio incitement, alongside popular participation driven by revenge, opportunity, fear, and indoctrination. Methods used in Mogadishu and spreading southward and centrally to areas such as Gaalkacyo, Afgooye, Kismaayo, Gedo, Barawa, and riverine regions included house-to-house searches and summary executions, particularly of middle-class professionals and men of distinction, with some houses marked with the letter "D"; widespread rape, including gang rape, as well as torture, mutilation, and humiliation; mass looting and dispossession, often justified as reclaiming "Darod wealth"; and the forced expulsion or flight of residents under threat of violence, resulting in permanent displacement for many survivors.

The violence extended over roughly two years and large territories, emptying significant areas of previous Darod residents. Political objectives centered on capturing exclusive control of the state and resources by eliminating perceived clan rivals. Discursive priming via clan hate-narratives was crucial for mobilizing perpetrators and justifying the acts. Contemporary international reporting and many later accounts largely overlooked or denied the organized clan dimension.

Kapteijns documents this through survivor testimonies, poetry, fiction, and other sources, emphasizing both its communal intimacy and top-down orchestration. She and others note subsequent denial, concealment, and impunity, which have hindered reconciliation.

== Rahanweyn (1991–1995) ==
In the wake of the Darod expulsions and USC fragmentation, a "War of the Militias" erupted involving dozens of new clan-based armed fronts. Civilian targeting became normalized strategy across sides; victims often became perpetrators and vice versa. Roles reversed as Darod-based alliances (e.g., SNF/SPM under figures like General Mohammed Said Hersi Morgan) counter-attacked and committed clan-based atrocities. Morgan was widely regarded as one of the key figures behind the military operations against the Isaaq in 1987–1989.

Particularly devastating was the violence in the inter-riverine regions (Bay, Bakool, Lower Shabelle, parts of Gedo) against Rahanweyn (Digil and Mirifle) agro-pastoralist communities. Rival militias, primarily SNF (Darod-linked) and USC (Hawiye-linked) elements, fought for control of productive land. Tactics included massacres, widespread sexual violence, systematic looting of food stores and crops, destruction of irrigation systems, and deliberate blocking or looting of humanitarian aid. This engineered or exacerbated famine (the "Triangle of Death", with Baidoa known as the "City of Death").

Estimates of Rahanweyn deaths from direct violence, starvation, and displacement range from 200,000 to 500,000. Many were displaced or had land seized by incoming militias and their clan affiliates. Some Rahanweyn/SDM elements initially aligned with or participated in aspects of the USC campaign before broader dynamics shifted. The Rahanweyn later formed the Rahanweyn Resistance Army (RRA) to reclaim territory, contributing to the eventual establishment of the South West State of Somalia.

This phase is explicitly described in sources as clan cleansing or ethnic cleansing of the Rahanweyn, fitting the pattern of organized clan-based civilian brutalization for territorial and political control.

== Analytical framework, debates, and legacy ==
Scholars apply "clan cleansing" to these episodes because they involved deliberate othering along clan lines, organized perpetration (state or militia), and goals of expulsion or elimination to achieve clan homogeneity or clan dominance in a territory. Kapteijns' analysis highlights how the 1991 phase marked a shift to more communal forms, with hate-narratives playing a central role in priming and triggering participation, equating entire clan constructs with political enemies regardless of individual actions.

Debates exist over terminology: Some (especially for the Isaaq case) prefer "genocide" due to scale, intent, and UN investigation findings. Others use "ethnic cleansing" or "clan cleansing" interchangeably for the clan-based nature. Kapteijns distinguishes the 1991 communal character while still employing "clan cleansing." The book and the term have been controversial among some Somali scholars and commentators, who have criticized aspects of the analysis for methodology, sourcing, or perceived bias, reflecting the highly contested historiography of these events.

The legacy includes hardened conflict identities, politicized clan narratives that persist in contemporary Somali politics, widespread impunity for perpetrators and organizers, and ongoing challenges to national reconciliation and moral repair. Public acknowledgment and honest reckoning with these episodes remain limited, complicating efforts at social reconstruction. The events contributed to the broader fragmentation of the Somali state and the normalization of civilian targeting in subsequent phases of conflict.

== See also ==
- Somali Civil War
- Somali Rebellion
- 1992 famine in Somalia
