= Rahanweyn =

Somali clan family

Rahanweyn رحنوين Reewin
- Somali clan
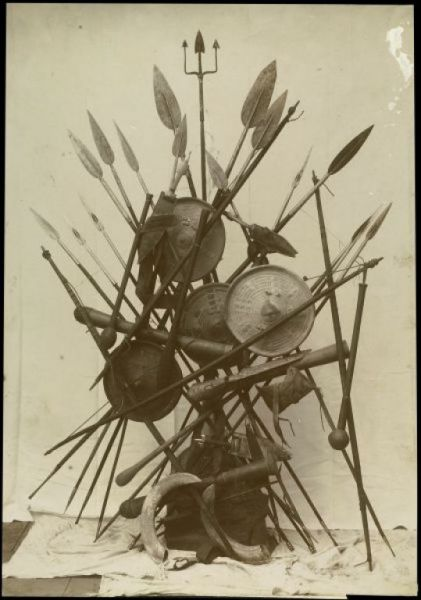
- Traditional weapons and tools of the Rahanweyn
- Ethnicity: Somali
- Location: (Somalia) Somalia (Ethiopia) Ethiopia; Kenya
- Branches: Digil; Mirifle
- Language: (Somalia) Somali (Maay dialect) (Arab League) Arabic
- Religion: Sunni Islam

The Rahanweyn (Maay: Reewin, Somali: Raxanweyn, Arabic: رحنوين), also known as the Digil and Mirifle (Somali: Digil iyo Mirifle) is a major Somali clan. It is one of the major Somali clans in the Horn of Africa, with a large territory in the densely populated fertile valleys of the Jubba and Shebelle rivers and the areas in between, which are mainly inhabited by settlers from the Digil and Mirifle lineages.

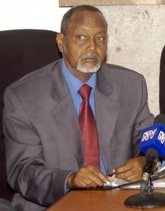
Hasan Muhammad Nur Shatigadud, former leader of Rahanweyn Resistance Army

== Etymology ==
Anthropologists and northern Somalis have helped coin the term Rahanweyn. The name is said to be a combination of Rahan (grindstone) and Weyn (large) which means (large grindstone) suggesting the name's semantic relation to the Reewin economy. Another more interesting term is said to combine the names of Rahan (crowd) and Weyn (large) which means (literally 'crowd-big' or the large crowds) indicating that the Reewin clans are a confederation of diverse Somali clans that migrated elsewhere.

However, all these definitions are based on the Northern Somali dialect rather than the southern Somali dialect therefore these definitions should be deemed inaccurate. The name is correctly pronounced Reewin which can be divided into Ree (family) and Wiin (old) which means (old family). This name is a reference to the Reewin ancient origins which might indicate that they might have been the first Somali group to migrate to modern-day Somalia whilst the rest of the Somali clans slowly began to diverge and develop their own unique distinct dialects. Another theory states that the name Rahanweyn derives from the name of the ancestor of all Rahanweyn clans, one Ma'd or Mohammed Reewin.

== Overview ==
Each of the two subclans of the Rahanweyn comprises a great number of clans and sub-clans. The Digil sub-clan mainly consists of farmers and coastal people, while the Mirifle are predominantly agro-pastoralists.

According to constitutional law, Somalis are linguistically grouped into Mai Terreh and Maxaa Tiri. The vast majority of the Somalis who speak Mai Terreh (also known as Mai-Mai or Af-Maay) are the Rahanweyn who descend from Sab, while the speakers of Maxaa Tiri (i.e. most spoken Somali) belong to other clans (Darod, Dir, Hawiye and Isaaq) who descend from Samaale. Both Sab and Samaale are believed to have been fathered by Hiil (ancestral father of all Somalis).

Rahanweyn clans contain a high number of adopted members, with British anthropologist I. M. Lewis describing the Rahanweyn as a "synthesis of old cultivating stock, and more recent and once nomadic immigrants from the other Somali clans", with almost every Somali lineage having some off-shoot living among them. This practice allows newcomers to integrate into resident clans in a pleasant manner. Furthermore, in riverine places such as Lower Shabelle or the Juba region, it adds to the complexity of lineage identity.

== Distribution ==
The clan resides in rich fertile lands in southern Somalia and lives on the banks of Somalia's two major rivers, the Shebelle and Jubba rivers. The Rahanweyn make up the majority in the southwestern regions of Bay, Bakool, and Lower Shabelle. They are also believed to be the silent majority in Jubbaland specifically in regions such as Gedo, Middle Juba, and Lower Juba. They are the second-largest clan to reside in Mogadishu. They are also found in the Somali Region of Ethiopia and the North Eastern Province of Kenya.

== History ==
=== Antiquity ===
Reewin groups were the first Somali/Cushitic group to enter what is the southern part of modern-day Somalia, around the end of the second century B.C.

The Rahanweyn clan were mentioned as the people of Reewin who lived in the fertile lands and coastal provinces and were very wealthy and powerful people during the antiquity period in southern Somalia. They were said to be a sub-group of the Barbaroi, ancestors of the Somali people.

=== Tunni Sultanate ===
The Tunni Sultanate (r. 9th century - 13th century) was a Somali Muslim Sultanate located in southwestern Somalia, south of the Shabelle river. It was ruled by the Tunni Rahanweyn people, who spoke the Af-Tunni. The historical Tunni area correspondence to modern-day Lower Shabelle region Barawa founded by a Tunni saint called Aw-Ali and became the new capital for the Tunni Sultanate. The town prospered and became one of the major Islamic centers in the Horn, the Barawaani Ulama, attracting students from all over the region. Muslim scholars of that time, such as Ibn Sa'id, wrote about Barawa as "an Islamic island on the Somali coast." Al-Idrisi also described the construction of the coral houses and noted that Barawa was full of both domestic and foreign commodities. The Ajuran would take over the region and end the Tunni Sultanate.

=== Ajuran Sultanate ===
Genealogical tree of Somali clans

Along with Hawiye, Rahanweyn clan also came under the Ajuran Empire control in the 13th century that governed much of southern Somalia and eastern Ethiopia, with its domain extending from Hobyo in the north, to Qelafo in the west, to Kismayo in the south.

=== Geledi Sultanate ===
At the end of the 17th century, the Ajuran Sultanate was on its decline, and various vassals were now breaking free or being absorbed by new Somali powers. One of these powers was the Geledi Sultanate which was established by Ibrahim Adeer a former Ajuran general that successfully pushed the imperial Ajuran army out of Afgooye. He subsequently established the Geledi sultanates ruling house, the Gobroon dynasty, after having first defeated the Ajuran vassal state, the Silcis Kingdom.

The Geledi Sultanate was a Rahanweyn Kingdom ruled by the noble Geledi clan which held sway over the Jubba and Shabelle rivers in the interior and the Benadir coast. The Geledi Sultanate dominated the East African trade and had enough power to force the southern Arabians to pay tribute to the noble Geledi Rulers like Sultan Yusuf Mahamud.

==== Administration and military ====
The Sultanate of Geledi exerted a strong centralized authority during its existence and possessed all of the organs and trappings of an integrated modern state: a functioning bureaucracy, a hereditary nobility, titled aristocrats, a taxing system, a state flag, as well as a professional army. The great sultanate also maintained written records of their activities, which still exist.

The Geledi Sultanate's main capital was at Afgooye where the rulers resided in the grand palace. The kingdom had a number of castles, forts and other variety of architectures in various areas within its realm, including a fortress at Luuq and a citadel at Bardera.

The Geledi army numbered 20,000 men in times of peace, and could be raised to 50,000 troops in times of war. The supreme commanders of the army were the Sultan and his brother, who in turn had Malaakhs and Garads under them. The military was supplied with rifles and cannons by Somali traders of the coastal regions that controlled the East African arms trade.

==== Trade ====
The kingdom maintained a vast trading network, trading with Arabia, Persia, India, Near East, Europe and the Swahili World, dominating the East African trade, and was a regional power.

In the case of the Geledi, wealth accrued to the nobles and to the Sultanate not only from the market cultivation which it had utilized from the Shebelle and Jubba valleys but also trade from their involvement in the slave trade and other enterprises such as ivory, cotton, iron, gold, among many other commodities. Generally, they also raised livestock animals such as cattle, sheep, goats, and chicken.

== Modern ==
=== Italian Protectorate ===
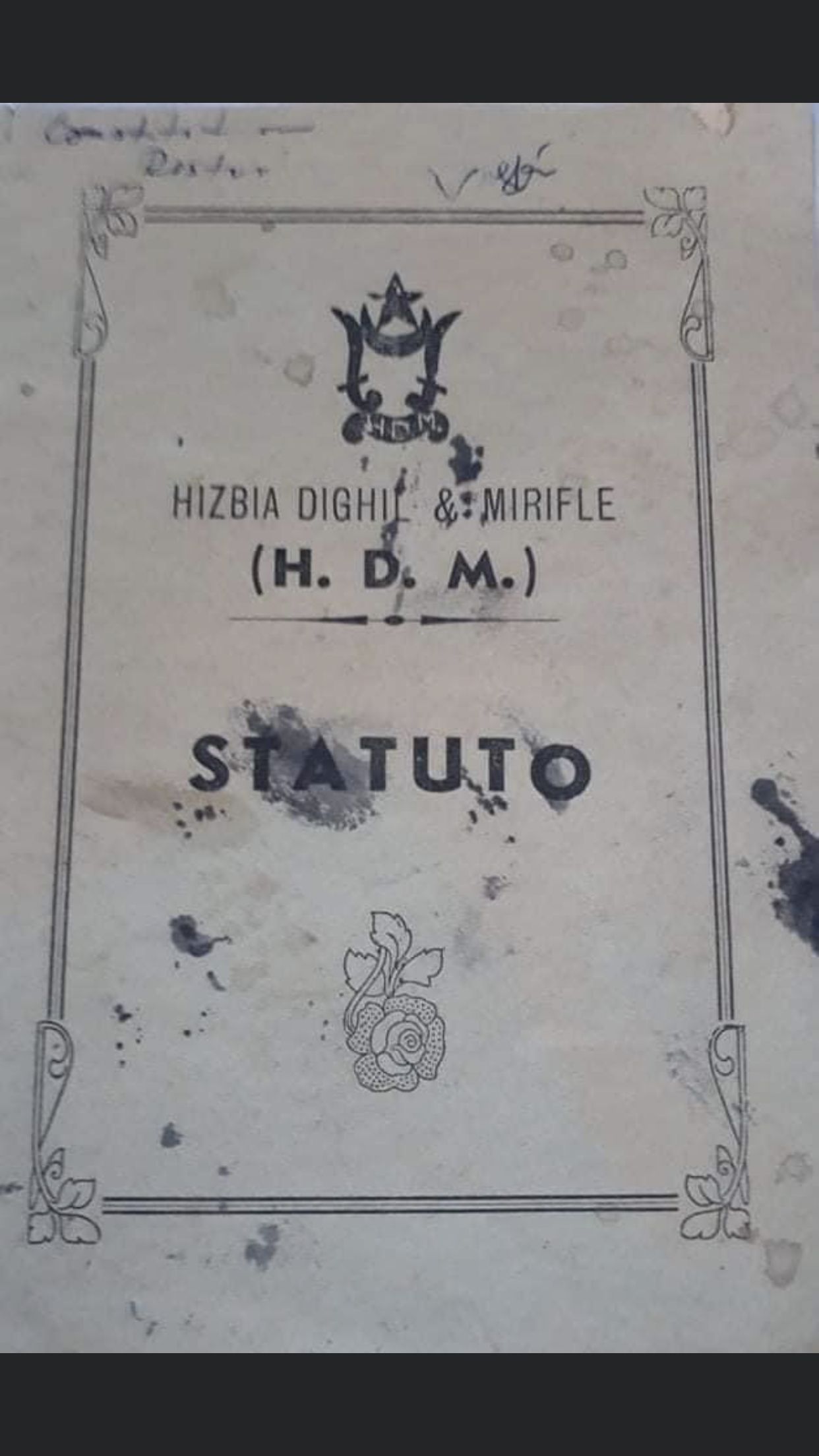
Hizbi Dhigil & Mirifle party statute in the 1950s

The Geledi Sultanate was eventually incorporated into Italian Somaliland Protectorate in 1908 by the Geledi ruler: Osman Ahmed who signed multiple treaties with the Italian colonials and the Kingdom ended with the death of Osman Ahmed in 1910.

=== Hizbi Dhigil & Mirifle ===
The Hizbi Dhigil & Mirifle (1947–1969) was a Somali political party formed by members of the Rahanweyn clan however Jeilani Sheikh Bin Sheikh was the first to be elected as the leader of (HDMS) and was among the first to call for Federalism in Somalia. It had its roots in the 1920s as the Hizbiya Dastur Mustaqil Al Sumal which was formed as an anti colonial organization that educated the inter riverine peoples and provided health and other charitable motions. Later the Hizbi Dhigil & Mirifle formed in 1947 and would be the main opposition party winning the 2nd most seats in parliament after the Somali Youth League. Its main goals were to advocate for the Digil and Mirifle peoples of Somalia and a true census of the Somali Republic. The party also pushed for improving agricultural and animal husbandry practices.

=== Political marginalization and land seizures ===
During the fight for independence, political parties were based on clan interest though these organizations claimed to act in the national interest and were against clan division. Thus, the anti-clan stance was an act in order to promote their clan interest. For example, the non-Rahanweyn, mainly Darod and Hawiye who dominated the Somali administration previously but who had already lived in tranquillity and harmony with Rahanweyn, declared the former pre-colonial loyalty of geeko mariidi (old days). Anti-clan laws were approved at independence that violated traditional land rights allowed the non-Rahanweyn to acquire gains at the expense of Rahanweyn. Under the disguise of nationalism, they promoted Darood and Hawiye interests. When Rahanweyn had political and numerical dominance in the interiverine region there was a petition to divide the region into nine provinces, only two remained in Rahanweyn's political control while the rest was Darood-led. This was supposedly a national development that turned out to be a hegemonic act and was aggravated by the Cooperative Development in 1974 under president Siad Barre when Rahanweyn land's was seized and annexed under an eminent domain law. The state farms thus used the Rahanweyn as labourers, but were managed by Darood and only promoted Darood interest, not the nation's interest.

Historically Jubbaland was Rahanweyn's stronghold and prior to Italian colonization, the region was ruled by Geledi Sultanate. In 1975, Mohammed Siad Barre, a member of the Marehan sub-clan of the Darood, created six different regions called Lower Juba, Middle Juba, Gedo, Bay, Bakool and Lower Shabelle for political reasons to favour the Darod and to weaken the Rahanweyn's political influence in the south. The Marehan were rewarded political powers to lead the Gedo region, Ogaden were rewarded political powers to lead the Middle Juba region, Harti, were rewarded political powers to lead the Lower Juba region, and finally, the Hawiye were rewarded political powers to lead Lower Shabelle. The major Rahanweyn historic towns located on the Jubba River such as Dolow, Luuq, Burdhubo, Bardheere, Saakow, Bu'ale, Jilib, Jamame and Kismayo, thus lost their Rahanweyn identity. The Rahanweyn were only positioned in the landlocked Bay region.

Report of the Nordic fact-finding mission to the Gedo region in Somalia states:

According to Abdirshakar Othawai, extensive settlement by the Marehan clans in the Gedo region had been going on for some considerable time. Back in 1977-1980, the Ogaden War between Somalia and Ethiopia triggered large movements of people, with many Marehan members being transferred from Ethiopia to Luuq and Burdhubo in particular.

The Somali government at the time, headed by Siad Barre, assisted Marehan settlers in Gedo with farm implements, among other facilities, while a Japanese NGO tried to persuade the Rahanweyn clans to accept the new Marehan settlers, arguing in particular that this time was a temporary arrangement. The Marehan settlers were at present living in those areas with the Rahanweyne clans being squeezed out there as a result.

The civil war in Somalia in the 1900s promoted most of the Gabaweyn sub-clan of Rahanweyn to leave the Gedo region and go to live in Kenya and Ethiopia. This enabled the Marehan clans finally to secure political power in the Gedo region. Abdullahi Sheikh Mohamed, of the UNOPS SRP, regarded that seizer of power as the culmination of a long-term strategy by the president at the time, Siad Barre with the Gedo region being established back in 1974 in order to create a regional base for the Marehan clans.

A similar fashion was happening in the Lower and Middle Juba regions where during the Ogaden War a huge number of Ogaden refugees were being resettled in Middle Jubba and during the famine crisis in northeast Somalia, the Harti clans were being resettled in Lower Jubba.

=== Civil war and South-West State ===
During the civil war, the less aggressive and peaceful Rahanweyn suffered the most out of any clan in Somalia. General Morgan the nephew of Siad Barre unified the Darood factions in Jubbaland and founded the Somali National Front and waged war against the self-declared president Mohamed Farrah Aidid who led the Hawiye militia known as the United Somali Congress. The Darood and Hawiye militia used Rahanweyn lands as their battleground and conducted all kinds of human rights violations against the indigenous population in the interiverine region. In the Bay province, the Marehan militia members targeted women as means of genocide against the Rahanweyn clan. Barre had planned to resettle Darood clans in the area and made secret plans with his son-in-law General Morgan to exterminate the Rahanweyn clan. In fact, this had been a long-term aim as evidence pointed out in the infamous documents "death letter one" and "death letter two" of 1987. In these Morgan proposed the idea for the annihilation of both the Isaaq in the north and the Rahanweyn in the south. Apart from the massacres, general Morgan used other kinds of cruel and barbarous methods such as using starvation as his key tactic by plundering NGO warehouses, raiding convoys, and a host of other schemes to prevent food aid from reaching the Rahanweyn. Given the outcome of the mortality rate, (40% of the population, including 70% of the children) his attempts to prevent food aid, steadily kill the survivors, and colonize the lands with his own clan, could be concluded that there was a deliberate effort to destroy the Rahanweyn. At the same time the self-declared president Mohamed Farrah Aidid and forces loyal to him were the more powerful armed militia occupied Rahanweyn dominated regions such as Bay, Bakool and Lower Shabelle in the guise of liberation against Siad Barre regime forces. The Habar Gidir militia in Lower Shabelle overstayed, began illegally settling by looting properties and farmlands and using the local Digil population as labour similar to Darood clans in Jubbaland.

Researcher and analyst Muuse Yuusuf states:

During the rebellion against General Siad Barre's regime, there were some Rahanweyn rebel groups, such as the SDM. However, they were not strong militarily and their political elite did not have access to the state military arsenal like the high-ranking military leaders of other Hawiye, Darood, and Isaaq factions who looted state arsenal. Rahanweyn elites did not also have an economic power base and a diaspora community to support their movement, factors that helped other factions. They were also divided among themselves, supporting different rebel groups. For example, SDM had to ally itself with the USC's different factions to eject remnants of president Siad Barre's forces from their lands. Indeed, clans elders from these regions asked general Aideed to help them liberate their land from forces loyal to president Siad Barre, which were committing atrocities in the region. As it turned out, General Aideed's USC faction betrayed them politically when its militiamen occupied Rahanweyn regions under the pretext that they had liberated them from the 'fallen' regime. Therefore, at the collapse of the military dictatorship, Rahanweyn clans and small non-Somali ethnic groups found themselves defenseless and trapped between marauding Hawiye and Darood factions in what became known as the 'triangle of death' in which Baidoa, the capital city of the Bay region, became the city of death. They suffered most when up to 500,000 people starved to death because of the destruction of the farmlands and properties and confiscation of farms by the warring factions. And also because of what was described as 'genocidal policy' under which Hawiye and Darood factions were determined to exterminate Rahanweyns. If you compare Rahanweyn's experience with any other clan's experience, it becomes obvious that they were not only marginalized throughout Somali history but also suffered more than any other clan during the civil war as hundreds of thousands of people died because of the conflict and other war-related causes.

At the beginning of the year 1993, the constant war and communal suffering the Rahanweyn endured, the Rahanweyn community came to the realization that they shared the same history and experience of political marginalization and victimization throughout modern Somali history, had emerged. By March 1993, Somali Democratic movement organized a peacemaking conference to unite the riverine clans which were held in Bonkain town in the Bay province. By 1994. Rahanweyn were successful in establishing their own administrations and Baidoa was no longer considered the city of famine. In 1995, Rahanweyn held a congress in Baidoa to promote their interest by uniting the interiverine communities and demanding an autonomous regional state. The vision was ambitious and consisted of six administrative regions of Bay, Bakool, Lower Shabelle, Middle Juba, Lower Juba, and Gedo under this project the Rahanweyn were regarded as the rightful majority in these regions. However, despite this project sounding good to the interiverine clans, there were still some challenges lying ahead for example the Rahanweyn traditional territories were still being occupied by Darood and Hawiye militias and massive displacement of the indigenous people had disturbed the region's socio-political and local businesses. It wasn't until late 1995 where the Rahanweyn Resistance Army was founded to liberate the Rahanweyn lands and launched a series of military campaigns against Aidid's militiamen. By 1999, RRA forces successfully drove out the Habar Gidir fighters from the Bay, Bakool, and Lower Shabelle regions. The next target was Jubbaland and to expel the illegal settlers that came in the time of the military dictator Siad Barre. However, the plan was halted in 2000 when the transitional national government was established. Both the Hawiye and Darood clans feared Rahanweyn's growing political ambition and complained to the international community to pressure the Rahanweyn to accept the current status quo. Nevertheless, the Rahanweyn communities were finally pleased they managed to establish their own autonomous state in the year 2002 and reaffirmed their autonomy from the hegemonic Darood and Hawiye factions. To them, they ultimately remembered their long-held dream for an autonomous federal state which their ancestors had advocated for in the early 1950s. The creation of the RRA and the declaration of the Southwest State of Somalia was an indicator of the clan's victory over the dominant factions, originating from far away places like the central regions. By establishing their own state and army, the Rahanweyn clan positioned themselves to be a force to be reckoned with. A country that was already split along clan-based states. This historical action was nothing more than a coping mechanism that came about in the civil war just like the Isaaq and Majerteen that formed their own autonomous states.

The Rahanweyn Resistance Army founded the autonomous state known as South West State of Somalia which was able to establish its own government, economy, army and flag. The Southwest state was credited as an important pillar of stability in southern Somalia.

== Clan tree ==
The following listing is taken from the World Bank's Conflict in Somalia: Drivers and Dynamics from 2005 and the United Kingdom's Home Office publication, Somalia Assessment 2001.

- Rahanweyn
  - Digil
    - Geledi
    - Begedi
    - Dabarre
    - Tunni
    - Jiddu
    - Garre
    - Shanta Caleemo
  - Mirifle
    - Sagaal
      - Jilible
      - Eylo
      - Gasaargude
      - Gawaweyn
      - Geeladle
      - Luwaay
      - Hadame
      - Yantaar
      - Hubeer
    - Sideed
      - Leysan
      - Hariin
      - Eelay
      - Jiroon
      - Waanjel
      - Haraw
      - Maalinweyn
      - Disow
      - Eemid
      - Qoomaal
      - Yeledle
      - Qamdi
      - Garwaale
      - Reer Dumaal
      - Helledy

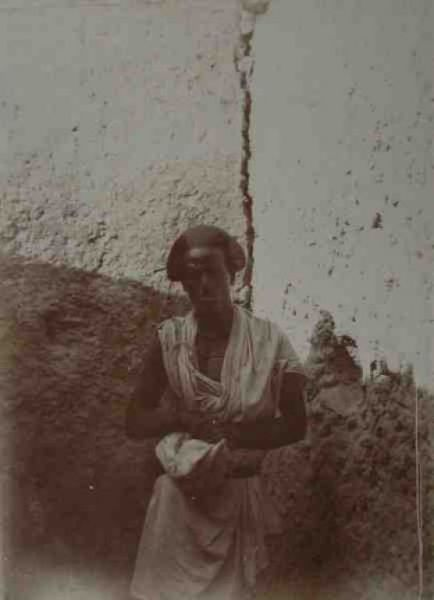
A Rahanweyn man

In the south central part of Somalia the World Bank shows the following clan tree:

- Rahanweyn
  - Digil
    - Geledi
    - Jiddo
    - Begedi

Christian Bader lists the principal Digil and Rahanweyn subclans as follows:

- Sab
  - Amarre
    - Daysame
      - Digil
        - Maad
          - Rahanweyn
            - Jambaluul
            - Midhifle
            - Begedi
            - Aleemo
          - Maatay
            - Irroole
            - Dabarre
          - 'Ali Jiidu
          - Dubdheere
            - Waraasiile
            - Tikeme
          - Duubo
          - Digiine
          - Iise Tunni

== Notable Rahanweyn people ==
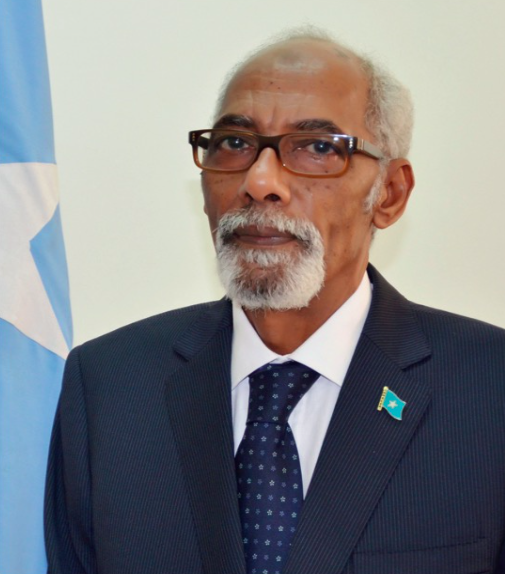
Mohamed Osman Jawari, former Speaker of Parliament

- Sheikh Aden Mohamed Noor Aden Madobe, current Speaker of the Federal Parliament of Somalia.
- Ibrahim Adeer, first sultan of the Geledi Sultanate.
- Uways al-Barawi, famous Islamic saint and a religious leader who rebelled the Italians on the Benadir coast.
- Abdulkadir Sheikh Sakhawudeen, Founder of the Somali Youth League and grandson of Sheikh Uweys al-Barawi.
- Jeilani Sheikh Bin Sheikh, leading representative, first president of Hisbia Digil Mirifle, Somalia's second largest political party.
- Aden Mohamed Noor (Aden Saran-Sor), Former Minister for finance and current MP.
- Abdulcadir Muhammed Aden, Former Speaker of Parliament, Minister of Finance and leader of Hisbia Digil Mirifle.
- Osman Ahmed, fifth and final Geledi sultan and defeated both the Dervish and Ethiopian Empire in battle during his reign.
- Abdallah Isaaq Deerow, former Minister of Constitutional Affairs of the Transitional National Government.
- Abdiaziz Hassan Mohamed Laftagareen, current president of Southwest state of Somalia.
- Ibrahim Hussein Abdirahman Fuutjeele, Somali social activist and the social positivism union and Somali pressure group founder.
- Muhammad Ibrahim Habsade, former rebel and Minister Agriculture in the Transitional Federal Government.
- Abdihakim Mohamoud Haji-Faqi, former Minister of Defence of Somalia.
- Mohamed Sheikh Hassan Hamud, Minister of Defence of Somalia.
- Sharif Hassan, former speaker of Somali Parliament, former deputy Prime Minister and Finance Minister, first president of Southwest State of Somalia.
- Sheikh Mukhtar Mohamed Hussein, former Speaker of Parliament and interim President of Somalia.
- Mahamud Ibrahim, second sultan of Geledi who militarized the state and successfully repelled an Oromo invasion and Arab pirates.
- Mohamed Ibrahim, former Minister of the Transitional National Government
- Osman Ibrahim, former deputy minister of labor and social affairs and current deputy minister of water and energy
- Yusuf Mahamud Ibrahim, third sultan of the Geledi, presided over the Geledi golden age.
- Mohamed Jawari, former Speaker of the Federal Parliament of Somalia.
- Abdi Kusow, professor of sociology at Iowa State University.
- Saredo Mohamed (Maadker) Abdallah, an influential Member of the Federal Parliament of Somalia.
- Sheikh Mukhtar Robow Ali (Abu Mansur), Minister of Religion affairs and former member and spokesman for Al Shabaab (2007–2013).
- Mustafa Mohamed Moalim (Mustafa Maxamed Macalin), first fighter pilot in Somalia, Chief of Somali Air Force School and Chief of Somali Air.
- Mohamed Haji Mukhtar, professor of African and Middle Eastern History at Savannah State University.
- Abdullahi Haji Hassan Mohamed Nuur, former Foreign Minister of Somalia, and former Minister of Agriculture and Livestock.
- Hasan Muhammad Nur Shatigadud, former chairman of the Rahanweyn Resistance Army, former Finance Minister, first President of Southwestern Somalia.
- Abbas Abdullahi Sheikh Siraji, former Minister of Public Works and Reconstruction.
- Mohamud Siraji, Member of Parliament and Chair of the Committee on Budget, Finance, Planning and Oversight of Government Financial institutions.
- Ahmed Yusuf, fourth Geledi sultan and powerful successor of Yusuf.
- Abdulkadir Mohamed Nur, current Minister of Defense.
- Abdikadir Sheikh Hassan, former Speaker of Mandera County Assembly and prominent lawyer.
- Abdullahi Adan Ahmed (Black), current MP, former Minister of Transportation, Southwest and RRA veteran.

== See also ==
- Somali aristocratic and court titles
- Geledi Sultanate
- South West State of Somalia
