= Tunni =

Somali clan confederacy

Beelweynta Tunni Shangamaas

Regions with significant populations
- Somalia

Languages
- Somali (Tunni)

Religion
- Islam (Sunni)

Related ethnic groups
- Geledi, Garre, other Rahanweyn groups

The Tunni (Somali: Tunni) are a Somali clan that make up part of the wider Digil-Rahanweyn branch. It is one of the major clans that inhabit the South West State of Somalia and can also be found in Jubbaland.

== Overview ==
The Tunni clan are split into 5 different sub-clans which are: Daffarat, Werile, Hajuuwa, Daqtiira and Goygaal.

The Tunni speak Af-Tunni (a dialect of Somali). Some Tunni people, particularly those who are ancestrally from Barawa speak Chimwini, a variety of Swahili.

== History ==
=== Antiquity ===
The Tunni clan are believed to be one of the oldest Somali clans and one of the early herding communities in the Horn. They are believed to have occupied the lower Shabelle valley since 2000 B.C.E and occupied the Jubba valley along with their cousin Garre since 1000 B.C.E.

=== Tunni Sultanate ===
The Tunni, composed of five sub-clans (Warile, Da'farad, Hajuwa, Dakhtira, and Goygali), they established their own Sultanate called Tunni Sultanate. The Tunni made a treaty with the Jiddu so that Tunni settled on the west bank of the Shabelle and the Jiddu settled on the east bank. Both also agreed to resist foreign penetration, to allow only Seddah Saamood (the three foot-prints, which are the Tuni, the Jiddu, and the wild beasts). However, they did accept the first Muslim migrants, the Hatimi from Yemen and the Amawi from Syria, around the 10th century, for both religious and commercial reasons. Barawa founded by a Tunni saint called Aw-Ali and became the new capital for the Tunni Sultanate. The town prospered and became one of the major Islamic centers in the Horn, the Barawaani Ulama, attracting students from all over the region. Muslim scholars of that time, such as Ibn Sa'id, wrote about Barawa as "an Islamic island on the Somali coast." Al-Idrisi also described the construction of the coral houses and noted that Barawa was full of both domestic and foreign commodities.

Eventually, the Tunni people abandoned the pastoral lifestyle and established themselves largely as farmers on the rich arable land, were they grew a variety of fruits and vegetables but they still continued to practice livestock grazing. They established a number of concentrated settlements on the interior such as Buulo, Golweyn, and Xaramka, Jilib, Jamaame, and their center Qoryooley. The Tunni Somali clan inhabiting the cultivated Shebelle valley behind the coast produced foodstuffs for the coastal towns as well as acting as brokers for other Somali traders further inland.

=== Early Modern ===
After the end of the Ajuran Sultanate the Tunni would form part of the Geledi Sultanate and prospered as Barawa was a prominent hub in both states. They would be the first to join the Benadir revolt with Sheikh Uways al-Barawi a hero of Barawa.

== Geography ==
The Tunni clan can be split into 2 groups: agro-pastoralists who herd cattle, goats and sheep which can be found in towns and villages in Baraawe, Jilib and Dinsoor districts. The second group, are urbanites, which can be found in Baraawe city and other urban centres in southern Somalia. In Piazza, 1905, the Tunni population was approximately 15,000 (both agro-pastarolists and urbanites), where the majority of Tunni's were found outside of Baraawe (approximately 13,000 outside the city and 2,100 inside the city).

== Clan tree ==
According to Abdalla Omar Mansur's "The Nature of the Somali Clan System", the Tunni clan are split into 5 groups which are then further split up into 4 clans from varying clans.

- Tunni
  - Daffarat
    - Erwerri
    - Mudun
    - Geesi
    - Boqolle
  - Werrile
    - Gaafle
    - Madowe
    - Yare
    - Furur
  - Hajuwa
    - Hurre
    - Waaqsheyn
    - Mabagolle
    - Nageeye
    - Carab Koraale (Wax Yar Lagu Jiro)
  - Daqtiira
    - Minhoraad
    - Waransille
    - Bedelamma
    - Kumurto
  - Goygal
    - Hamar
    - Doyle
    - Matangalle
    - Fadido

== Notable Tunni people ==
- Sheikh Uways al-Barawi, Famous Islamic saint and a religious leader who rebelled the Italians on the Benadir coast and spread Islam over Asia and Africa. Invented Af Maay and Af Chimini Wadaad Script
- Abdiqadir Sakhawuddin Sheikh Uweys, President and founder of the Somali Youth League and grandson of Sheikh Uweys al-Barawi.
- Maxamed Cusman Maxamed (Baarbe) Member of 《Somali Youth League》
- Aw Al, Founded Barawa port city according to oral traditions.
- Muna Khalif Somali-American entrepreneur (CEO of Muna Kay), fashion designer and former MP of Somalia.
- Abdihakim Mohamoud Haji-Faqi 2x former Minister of Defense of Somalia. Vice President/Deputy Prime Minister of Somalia 2010-11.
- Liban Ibn Mujahid Ajuuran Empire general from the Tunni who decimated Portuguese forces during the Battle of Barawa.
- General Sharif Shekhuna Maye Chief in charge of the Somali police force.
- Dr. Liban Abukar Osman (Baffo) General secretary of South West State Assembly (2020) and then the Commissioner of Barawe City (2021).

== See also ==
- Tunni language
- Rahanweyn
- Tunni Sultanate
- Ajuran Sultanate
- Sultanate of the Geledi
- Bravanese people
