= Ibrahim Adeer =

Sultan of the Geledi (r. late 17th century–mid-18th century)

Ibrahim Adeer ابراهيم أدير

Sultan of the Geledi
- Reign: late 17th century–mid-18th century
- Predecessor: Monarchy established
- Successor: Mahamud Ibrahim
- Dynasty: Gobroon dynasty
- Religion: Islam

Ibrahim Adeer (Somali: Ibraahin Adeer, Arabic: ابراهيم أدير) was a Somali ruler. He founded the Sultanate of the Geledi. He subsequently established the Geledi sultanate's ruling house, the Gobroon dynasty, after having to successfully rebel and expel the Ajuran Sultanate and ruled large parts of Horn of Africa.

== Biography ==
In the late 17th century, Adeer, who was an Ajuran general at the time, gathered 12,000 members of the Geledi tribe, under the leadership of Ibrahim Adeer successfully pushed back the imperial Ajuran army out of Afgooye. He had united all Maay speaking people, Digil & Mirifle clans using both military and diplomatic means. Sultan Ibrahim repeatedly defeated the Ajuran army in numerous battles; marched through what is now known Bakool and Bay regions where he defeated the Madanle clan part of the imperial Ajuran confederacy, and Afgooye where he defeated the Silcis Dynasty also part of the imperial Ajuran confederacy. He marched towards Bardheere and Luuq in Gedo region where he expelled the Ajuran clan and established a garrison in Dolow. His final conquest when he marched south of Jubba valley reaching what is now known as Kismayo and quickly expelling the Ajuran imperial armies and in the process, he had conquered half the entirety of the Ajuran Empire.

Sultan Ibrahim, who was the son of Adeer Gobroon, thus became the first sultan of the new dynasty. His son, Mahamud Ibrahim, would later succeed him atop the throne.

Preceded by Position Established	Geledi sultanate	Succeeded by Mahamud Ibrahim

== See also ==
- Somali aristocratic and court titles
