= Ahmed Warsame =

Somali military officer

Ahmed Hassan Warsame
- Military career
- Allegiance: Somalia
- Rank: General
- Commands: Somali Military Academy

General Ahmed Warsame was the head of the former Somali Military Academy and Somali National Front militia.
