= Omar Haji Mohamed =

Major General Omar Haji Mohamed Cumar Xaji Maxamed
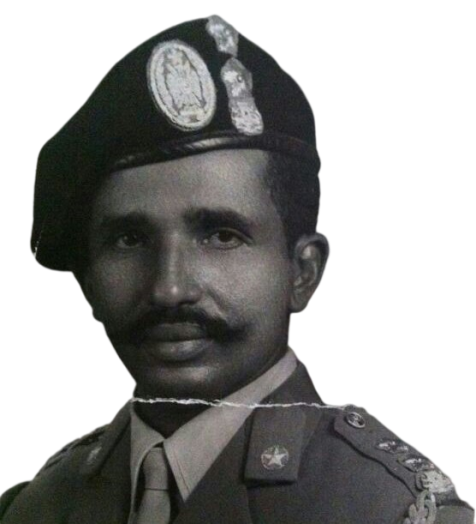
- Colonel Masalle in 1973

Minister of Defence
- In office 1981–1982

Personal details
- Born: 1934 Beledweyne, Somalia
- Died: November 2014 (aged 80) Mogadishu, Somalia
- Nickname: Massale

Military service
- Allegiance: Somalia Somali National Front
- Branch/service: Somali Army
- Years of service: 1961–1991
- Rank: Major General
- Commands: Minister of Defence; Deputy Commander in Chief of the Armed Forces; Commander of 2nd Armoured Brigade
- Battles/wars: Somali civil war: Somali Rebellion; Battle of Kismayo (1999)
- Awards: Gold Medal for Bravery and Service

Omar Haji Mohamed 'Masalle' (Somali: Cumar Xaaji Masalle); (1934–2014). Born in Beledweyne from a Marehan family. He was a commander of the Somali military in the Hiiraan Region, in Central Somalia. Before he joined the military, he was a language teacher. He also became a Somaliminister of defence and health minister.

== Biography ==
Masale was one of the commanding officers of the Ogaden War, and was ethnically related to the late Somali president Siad Barre. Masale was the second deputy to the joint chiefs of staff and the head of the 2nd armored division (formerly 2nd Brigade).

== Somali National Front ==
In 1991, after the collapse of the Somali Democratic Republic, Omar led the Somali National Front (SNF), whose area of operation stretched from the Gedo region of Somalia, to Kismaayo which was captured in 1999.

For most of the civil war the SNF governed and conducted operations in the Gedo region of southern Somalia. In an effort to restore order in the area, the SNF supported the creation of an Islamic Sharia court to resolve disputes and a police force to maintain order. As a result, a relatively effective governing administration was established in the region. The SNF's political leadership, was led by former Defense Minister General Omar Haji Masallah, and based in Nairobi, Kenya, while the military wing led by General Mohammed Hashi Ghani,(former governor of Hargiesa) was based in the city of Luuq, Gedo. The organization would be consistently represented at all major national reconciliation and peace conferences over the 1990s.
