= Abdallah Isaaq Deerow =

Somali politician (1950–2006)

Abdallah Isaaq Deerow عبد الله اسحاق ديرو
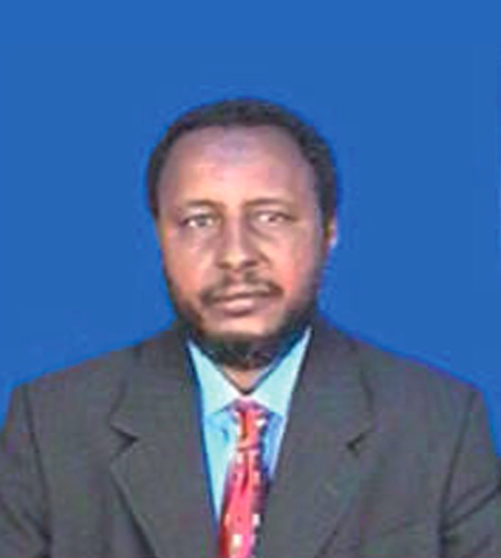

Minister of Constitutional Affairs of the Transitional Federal Government
- In office 2004–2006

8th Speaker of the Parliament of Somalia Transitional National Government
- In office 2000–2003
- Succeeded by: Sharif Hassan Sheikh Aden

Personal details
- Born: 1950
- Died: 2006 (aged 55–56)

Abdallah Deerow Isaaq (Somali: Cabdalle Deeroow Isaaq, Arabic: عبد الله اسحاق ديرو; 1950 – 2006), sometimes Abdullah Deerow Isaq, was a Somali politician. He served as the first Speaker of Parliament in the Transitional National Government of Somalia from 2000 to 2003, and was later the Minister of Constitutional and Federal Affairs in the Transitional Federal Government. He was assassinated in July 2006.

== Political career ==
Deerow was a member of the Rahaweyn clan and was a representative of that clan at the 2000 Somalia National Peace Conference (the Djibouti Conference). He was elected as the Speaker of the parliament in the Transitional National Government (TNG) on August 20, 2000. As speaker, he presided over the election of Abdiqasim Salad Hassan as TNG President at the Djibouti Conference.

In August 2003, Deerow was dismissed as Speaker of the parliamentary assembly, a decision which he maintained was illegitimate because the TNG's mandate had already ended earlier in the month. In 2004, he was named Minister of Constitutional and Federal Affairs in the TNG's successor, the Transitional Federal Government (TFG), by President Abdullahi Yusuf Ahmed.

== Assassination ==
On July 28, 2006, as Deerow left Friday prayers from a mosque in Baidoa, which was at the time the temporary seat of the TFG, a lone gunman shot him dead. Riots subsequently erupted in the city streets in protest of the killing. In response, the authorities began a security crackdown.
