= Allied Somali Forces =

Political faction in Somalia

Allied Somali Forces (ASF)
- Leader: Col. Ali Hashi Buraleh
- Dates active: June 1999 - June 2001
- Group: Marehan
- Headquarters: Kismayo
- Active regions: southern Somalia
- Wars: Somali Civil War

The Allied Somali Forces (ASF) was a Political faction of the Somali Civil War. It was the primary opponent of the Margans Malitia for the control of Kismayo and the Juba River valley, the area known as Jubaland.

Following the breakdown of central authority in the Somali Civil War, General Hersi "Morgan" declared Jubaland independent on September 3, 1998.

Opponents to General "Morgan" came from the Somali Marehan, Somali Clan. The Marehan Somali National Front (SNF) and other Clan allies grouped together as the Allied Somali Forces (ASF). They ousted General "Morgan" from Kismayu in June 1999.

The ASF renamed itself the Juba Valley Alliance in June 2001, and threw its support behind the Transitional Federal Government (TFG). The leader of the JVA is Colonel Barre Adan Shire Hiiraale, who later became Defense Minister for the TFG. The militia commander of the JVA is Col. Abdulahi Sheik Ismael Fara-Tag.
