= Mohamed Omar Salihi =

Somali marine scientist (1952–2021)

Personal details
- Born: 1952 Luuq, Somalia
- Died: 2 September 2021 (aged 68–69) Mogadishu
- Citizenship: Somali
- Education: Warsaw University of Technology

Mohamed Omar Salihi (Somali: Maxamed Cumar Saalixi, Arabic: محمد كوملورد الجنس) was a marine scientist, engineer, and maritime advisor to the Somali presidency, recognised for preserving Somalia's maritime database during the civil war which began in 1991. In a 2021 statement following his death, former prime minister Mahdi Guled described Salihi as a "backbone of the maritime case between Somalia and Kenya" and as working for his country "without any help". He contributed to documentation and mapping during the Somalia-Kenya maritime case, which began in 2014 and concluded in March 2021. On 2 September 2021, he died at Aden Adde Airport, Mogadishu upon returning from Turkey, where he had been undergoing treatment for diabetes.

== Early life and education ==
Mohamed Omar Salihi was born in 1952 in Luuq, Somalia. His father worked for the local administration in Luuq, where he also went to primary school between 1958 and 1964. In 1965, he enrolled at middle school in Baidoa, Bay Province, where he graduated in 1968. Mohamed later moved to the capital Mogadishu for his secondary school education in Banadir Secondary School in Mogadishu, ranking among the top five students nationally in Somalia. This qualified him for a scholarship to study in Poland, where he completed his undergraduate and postgraduate education at Warsaw Polytechnical University, Faculty of Geodesy in Warsaw from 1973 to 1979 before returning to Somalia.

== Career ==
Upon his return to Somalia, Salihi worked on the Bay Project, a development project in Baidoa. This project was supported by USAID. He later worked for the Directive of Surveys and Maps at the Ministry of Defense, where he served as a soldier. Salihi attained the rank of colonel in the Somali National Army due to his higher educational level. The cartographic maps he helped develop in the Ministry would later contribute to the resolution of border issues and provincial lines in Somalia, and can still be found at the Somali Foreign Affairs Ministry.

Between 1983 and 1987, Salihi would aid in the surveying of lands and the building of landmarks like The National Museum, Ministry of Defense-owned farms, and construction of water canals. He was also the Director General in the Irrigation Directive of Lower Shabelle from 1987 to 1990. The military government appointed him to a special committee to demarcate the unofficial border between Somalia and Ethiopia. He later helped facilitate humanitarian work under UNSOM and UNOPS in the Gedo province following the civil war. Under the Transitional National Government of president Abdiqasim, he was deputy Minister for Agriculture.

Salihi later went to Dar es Salaam, Tanzania to study remote sensing and satellite photos to gather sensory data. He also worked for a British company, Done International, where he was contracted for ten years to undertake Coastal Management. In addition to Somali and English, Salihi could also speak Arabic, Italian, Russian, and Polish.

Later, Salihi was part of the Somali delegation sent to the International Court of Justice on Maritime Delimitation in the Indian Ocean. Somalia has been in conflict with Kenya over Kenya's claim of Somali territorial waters that saw Somalia seek legal redress at the International Court of Justice. President Hassan Sheikh Mohamud, appointed him as his advisor on maritime affairs, a role that would persist under the following administration of President Mohamed Abdullahi Farmaajo. His topographical knowledge, and supporting documentation, strengthened Somalia's case at the International Court of Justice. Kenya had delayed the case four times and did not appear at the final hearing in The Hague. Engineer Salihi accompanied the Somali delegation in March 2021, headed by the deputy Prime Minister Mahdi Gulaid, and said the following prayer: “May Allah keep me alive to witness the court’s decision on the maritime case I put so much into it.” President Farmaajo led the final Janaza prayers, which were attended by the Prime Minister, Deputy Prime Minister, Minister for Religious Affairs, and other officials.
