= Muna Khalif =

Somalian politician

Muna Khalif منى خليف
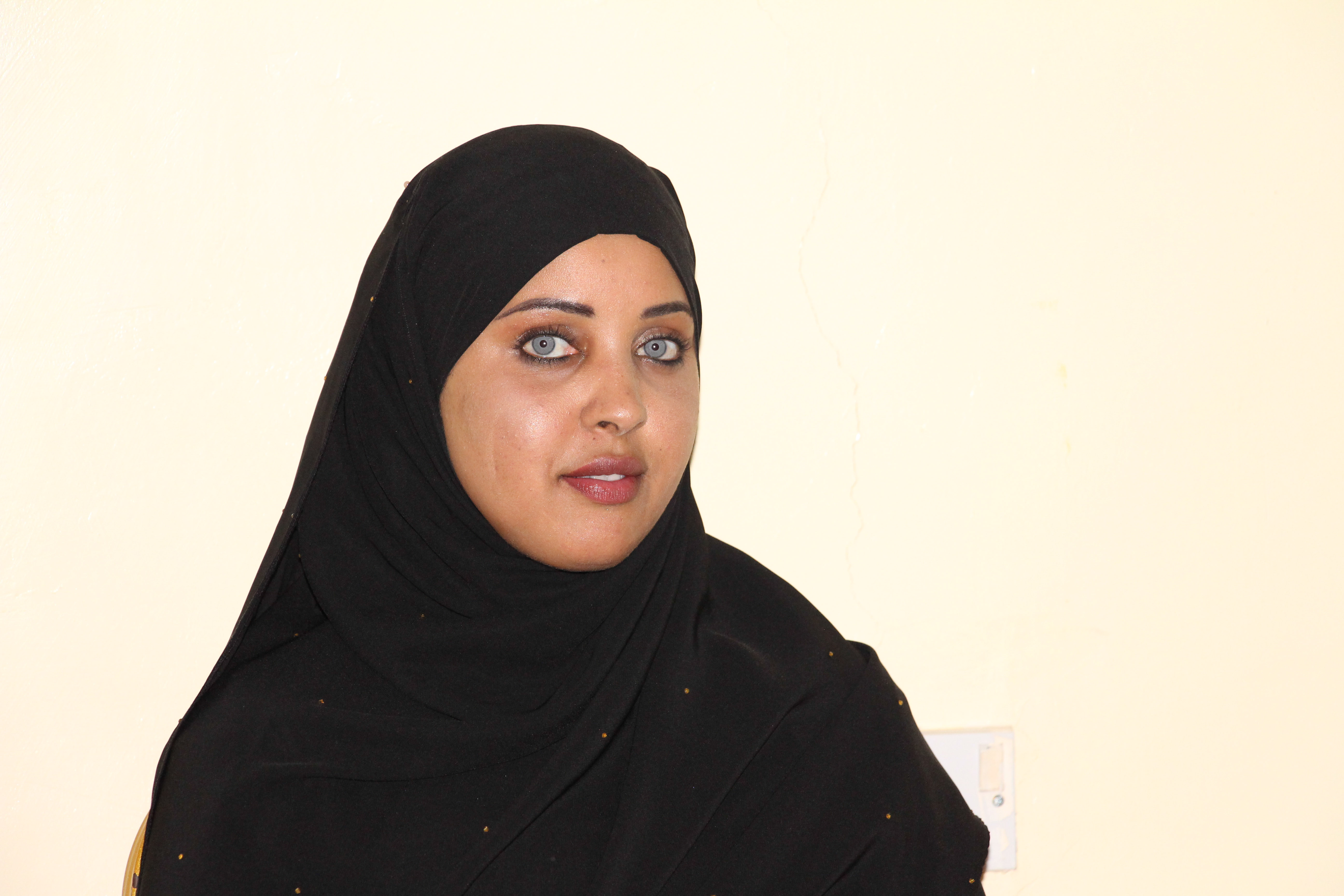

MP in the Federal Parliament of Somalia
- Incumbent
- Assumed office November 2016

Personal details
- Born: 1994-1995 Somalia
- Party: Independent

Muna Khalif Yusef (Somali: Muna Khalif Sheekh Abuu, Arabic: منى خليف), popularly known as Muna Kay, is a Somali-American entrepreneur, fashion designer and legislator. She is the founder and CEO of the Um Lemar brand. Khalif also serves as an MP in the Federal Parliament of Somalia, and she's elected from Southwest region.

== Personal life ==
Muna Khalif (full name - Muna Khalif Yusef) was born in Somalia. Her family is from the Tunni clan. After the civil war broke out in her place of birth, she and her parents emigrated to the United Kingdom. Khalif studied nutrition at college. She later also took courses in fashion design.

== Career ==
=== Muna Kay ===
Khalif is the founder and CEO of Um Lemar, an eponymous clothing line that caters to the Islamic market. She established the brand in order to provide young Muslim women with fashionable attire that adheres to prescribed standards of modesty. Khalif later launched Baby Lemar, an infant garment collection named after her son.

As of 2016, the Muna Kay company operates internationally, with retail outlets in North America, East Africa and Dubai. It also has a manufacturing hub in China.

Additionally, Khalif is the president of the Um Lemar Foundation. The philanthropic organization offers help to the disadvantaged, and provides artisanal training and mentorship to women and girls.

=== Federal Parliament of Somalia ===
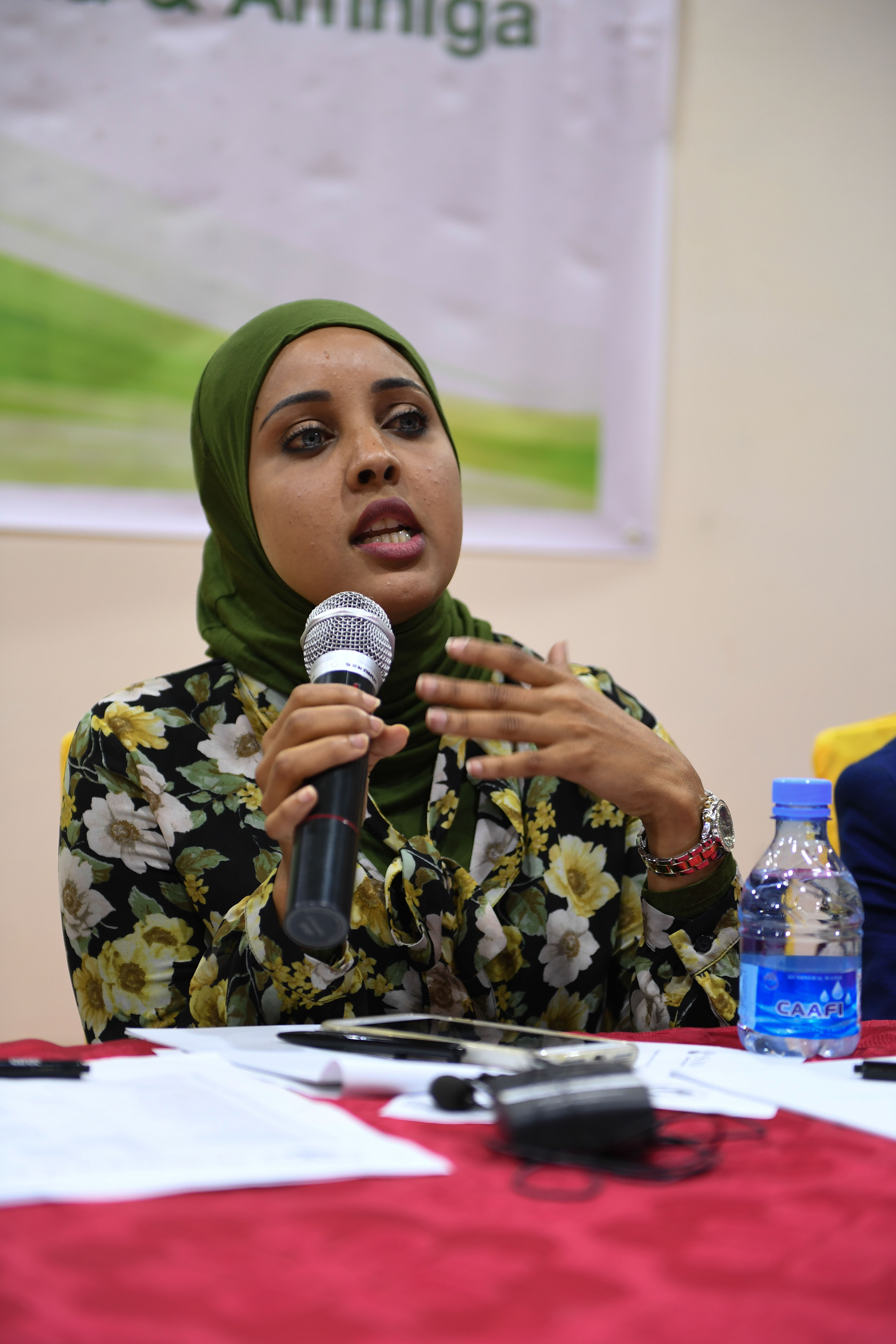
Federal legislator Muna Khalif chairing a political workshop.

In November 2016, Khalif presented herself as a candidate for a legislative seat in the Lower House of the Federal Parliament of Somalia. She was elected a representative for the South West State, earning 41 ballots.

An electoral oversight body later called for a reelection on the grounds that Khalif and seven other MPs had not met the ballot threshold. The Supreme Court upheld this ruling. However, the decision was eventually overturned by the Federal Parliament, with the Lower House instead authorizing the incumbency of Khalif and the other lawmakers.
