= Abdulkadir Sheikh Sakhawudeen =

Abdulkhadir Sheikh Sakhawudeen عبد القادر شيخ سخاودين
- Born: Somalia
- Died: 1946
- Occupation: politician
- Title: President Somali Youth League

Abdulkhadir Sheikh Sakhawudeen (Somali: Abdulqaadir Sheeh Saqaawudiin, Arabic: عبد القادر شيخ سخاودين) was a Somali political figure and activist.

== Biography ==
Abdulkhadir was born to a Tunni family.

He was the first President of the Somali Youth League (SYL), Somalia's first political party. Having also been instrumental as the founder of the organization following a meeting of 13 men he organised with Haji Mohamed Hussein and Yasin Osman at one of their houses to address the colonial discrimination he had personally witnessed and wished to absolve. He believed in a free state led by thinkers and revolutionaries like the Young Turks and the Young Arabs movements in the colonial countries. Abdulkhadir and other early SYL nationalists were strongly influenced by the religious rebellion at the turn of the century of various religious figures such as Uways al-Barawi, his direct grandfather.

The SYL was established in 1943.

== Personal life ==
Abdulkhadir Sheikh Sakhawudeen (c. 1906–1946) was a Somali Muslim religious educator, Sufi practitioner and nationalist leader whose activities were closely associated with the Islamic scholarly and anti-colonial traditions of southern Somalia. Born in Tiyeglow, northeast of Biyoley, he was the grandson of Sheikh Uways ibn Muhammad al-Barawi, the prominent Islamic scholar and founder of the Uwaysiyya movement . Imam Uways was an influential Islamic scholar and leader of the Qadiriyya Sufi order whose Uwaysiyya movement contributed significantly to the spread of Islamic education and religious organisation throughout East Africa.

According to historian Mohamed Haji Mukhtar, Sakhawudeen completed Qur'anic schooling at a young age, mastering Arabic and Islamic religious disciplines. He subsequently joined the Qadiriyya order and became a devoted practitioner of Sufism. He was extensively educated in Muslim history, Arabic literature and political affairs. During the late 1920s, he began organising jama'a religious communities dedicated to Islamic teaching, social organisation and resistance to Italian colonial rule. His religious activities established an important foundation for his later involvement in Somali nationalism.

His association with the Islamic Uwaysiyya movement is further documented by Christine Choi Ahmed in her 1989 study, God, Anti-Colonialism and Drums: Sheikh Uways and the Uwaysiyya. Ahmed identifies Sakhawudeen as a member of the Uwaysiyya , highlighting the movement's contribution to Somali political organisation. The study situates his involvement within a broader tradition of Islamic anti-colonial mobilisation in southern Somalia.

Sakhawudeen's religious education and community organising preceded his establishment of the Somali Youth Club in Mogadishu in May 1943. He recruited twelve other founding members from different Somali clans to establish an organisation advocating political independence, national unity and opposition to colonial domination. His leadership helped connect earlier community-based mobilisation with an emerging organised nationalist movement. Following his death, the Somali Youth Club was renamed the Somali Youth League in May 1947, becoming a leading organisation in the campaign for Somali independence. Historian Abdurahman M. Abdullahi (Baadiyow) describes Sakhawudeen and Yassin Haji Osman Sharmarke as having worked together to raise awareness of the Somali liberation struggle. According to Abdullahi, Sakhawudeen reportedly proposed establishing an Islamic organisation, reflecting his background in the Qadiriyya religious tradition, although the founders ultimately adopted the broader secular youth organisation proposed by Yassin.

Disputed claims concerning religious conversion

Despite extensive historical documentation of Sakhawudeen's Islamic religious education, membership in the Qadiriyya Sufi order and leadership within Islamic teaching communities, a later account by Aweis A. Ali, published in the Somali Bible Society Journal in 2021, alleges that Sakhawudeen converted to Roman Catholicism while receiving treatment for tuberculosis at Forlanini Hospital in Mogadishu. In 2021, Aweis A. Ali claimed that Sakhawudeen had become Christian.

Ali attributes the allegation to a 2012 publication by Mohamed A. Gurhan of the Somali Christian Mission. However, both articles do not reproduce baptismal documentation, contemporary church records, first-hand testimony or other contemporary documentary evidence establishing the alleged conversion. The account rests on a later missionary publication, rather than direct historical evidence presented in the article. The earlier Islamic activities documented by Mukhtar and Ahmed are firmly established, and resolve any claim otherwise.

The accounts also contain a significant chronological discrepancy. Ali states that Sakhawudeen died in June 1951, whereas Mukhtar's Historical Dictionary of Somalia records his death in Jigjiga in August 1946 while travelling to establish new Somali Youth Club branches. Abdi M. Kusow's entry in The Wiley Blackwell Encyclopedia of Race, Ethnicity, and Nationalism likewise identifies 1946 as the year of his death. These conflicting dates raise questions about the accuracy of the later account. Verified accounts regard Sakhawudeen's death. Mukhtar records that he died in Jijiga in August 1946 while establishing Somali Youth Club branches, a death year also reported by Kusow. The Evangelical Gurhan and Ali, however, give June 1951. Further raising a critical error against mainstream academic historians who regarded Abdulkhadir as modern Islamic thinker , who inherited his contemporary Islamic philosophy from his Grandfather and other respected scholars of that time.

== See also ==
- Somali Youth League
