= Barawa District =

Barawa
- District
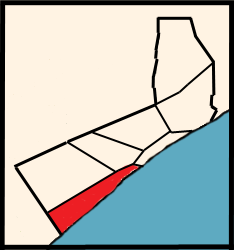
- Country: Somalia
- Region: Lower Shabelle
- Capital: Barawa
- Time zone: UTC+3 (EAT)

Barawa District (Somali: Degmada Baraawe) is a district in the southeastern Lower Shabelle (Shabeellaha Hoose) region of Somalia. Its capital lies at Barawa (Brava).
