= Tunni Sultanate =

African state

Tunni Sultanate Saldanadda Tunni (Somali) سلطنة تُنّي (Arabic)
- 9th century–13th century
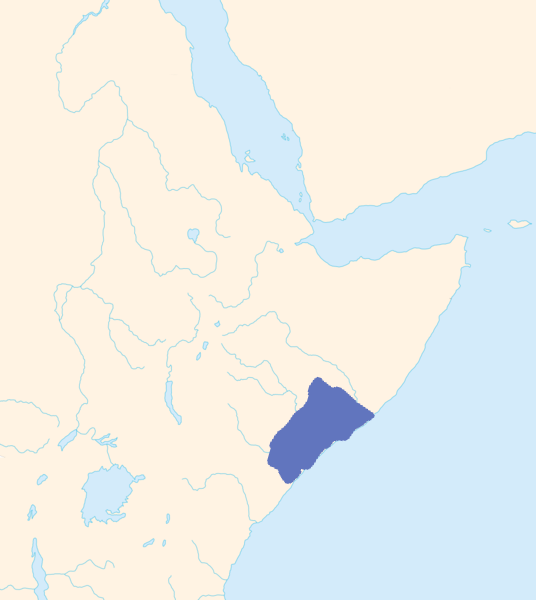
- Capital: Barawa
- Common languages: Somali; Arabic
- Religion: Islam
- Government: Monarchy
- History
  - Established: 9th century
  - Disestablished: 13th century
Preceded by	Succeeded by
Barbaria (region)	Ajuran Sultanate
- Today part of: Somalia

The Tunni Sultanate (Somali: Saldanadda Tunni) was a Somali Muslim Sultanate located in southwestern Somalia, south of the Shabelle river. It was ruled by the Tunni people, who speak the Af-Tunni language. The historical Tunni area corresponds to the modern-day Lower Shabelle region.

== History ==
=== Origin ===
The Tunni, composed of five sub-clans (Da'farad, Dakhtira, Goygali, Hajuwa, and Waridi), were the latest to drive the Jiddu into the interior, where they established their own Sultanate in Qoryoley. The Tunni made a treaty with the Jiddu so that Tunni settled on the west bank of the Shabelle, and the Jiddu settled on the east bank. Both also agreed to resist foreign penetration, to allow only Seddah Saamood (the three footprints, which are the Tuni, the Jiddu, and the wild beasts). However, they did accept the first Muslim migrants, the Hatimi from Yemen and the Amawi from Syria, around the 10th century, for both religious and commercial reasons. Barawa, founded by a Tunni saint called Aw-Al, became the new capital of the Tunni Sultanate. The town prospered and became one of the major Islamic centers in the Horn, the Barawaani Ulama, attracting students from all over the region. Muslim scholars of that time, such as Ibn Sa'id, wrote about Barawa as "an Islamic island on the Somali coast." Al-Idrisi also described the construction of the coral houses and noted that Barawa was full of both domestic and foreign commodities.

Eventually, the Tunni people abandoned the pastoral lifestyle. They established themselves largely as farmers on the rich arable land where they grew a variety of fruits and vegetables but they still continued to practice livestock grazing. They established a number of concentrated settlements on the interior, such as Buulo, Golweyn, Xaramka, Jilib, Jamaame, and their center, Qoryooley. The "Tunni Somali [clan] inhabiting the cultivated Shebelle valley behind the coast produced foodstuffs for the coastal towns as well as acting as brokers for other Somali traders further inland."

=== Warday Treaty ===
The Warday Oromo clan, under King Brawt, crossed the Jubba River and invaded the Tunni Sultanate. They were defeated and driven back, where the fight finally ended with another alliance that was signed in Jumbo the place now known as Gobweyn, between the Tunni and the Gala Warday. After the treaty was signed, the Tunni settled on the west bank of the Jubba River, and the Warday settle on the opposite side of the river, which was the east bank. These zones were known as Khad Tunni and Khad Gala (Tunni limit and Wardey limit). The land was also divided into three sections. One portion for the Tunni, another section for the Gala Warday, and the third portion was designated no man's land and was left for grazing. No groups were allowed to go beyond their boundary; both clans lived that way for 300 years.

=== Ajuran Takeover ===
By the mid-13th century, the Garen Kingdom, headquartered in Kelafo with an army under the great Somali king Abdalle Dayle conquered the Tunni Sultanate. It incorporated the state into the expanding Ajuran Sultanate. The Garen rulers claimed supremacy and religious legitimacy over other groups in the Horn of Africa.

== See also ==
- Ajuran Empire
- Barawa
- Tunni
