= Luuq District =

Luuq Luuq Maadow Luuq Ganaane
- District
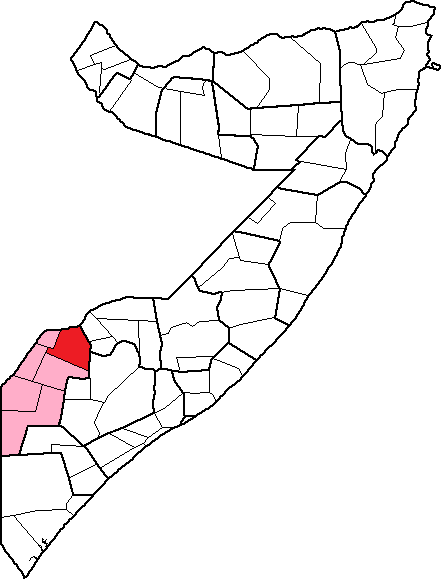
- Nickname: Luuq Aw Maadow
- Motto: Go to Luuq for Appeal
- Country: Somalia
- Regional State: Jubaland
- Region: Gedo
- Capital: Luuq

Population (2009)
  - Total: 200,000
- Time zone: UTC+3 (EAT)

Luuq District (Somali: Degmada Luuq) is an district in the southwestern Gedo region of Somalia. Its capital is the city of Luuq.

Luuq is a historical settlement that saw major conflicts, including the Battle of Luuq (1896–1900), where the Gasaargude dynasty and Sultanate of the Geledi (Gobron army) defeated the forces of Menelik II.

Luuq and its Gasaargude sultanate were detailed in the work of Italian explorer Ugo Ferrandi in his 1903 book Lugh, emporio commerciale sul Giuba.

Luuq is currently a multicultural city inhabited by several clans, primarily the Rahanweyn (Gasaargude, Malinweyne, Gawaweyn) and Marehan (Reer Ahmed, Reer Isaaq, Reer Hassan).

During the early stages of the Somali Civil War, local scholars established Sharia courts in Luuq District, making it one of Somalia's safest and most stable areas throughout much of the 1990s.
