= Barawa =

Barawa Barawy Baraawe بَرَأَاوٖ Barāwa ﺑَﺮَﺍﻭَة
- City
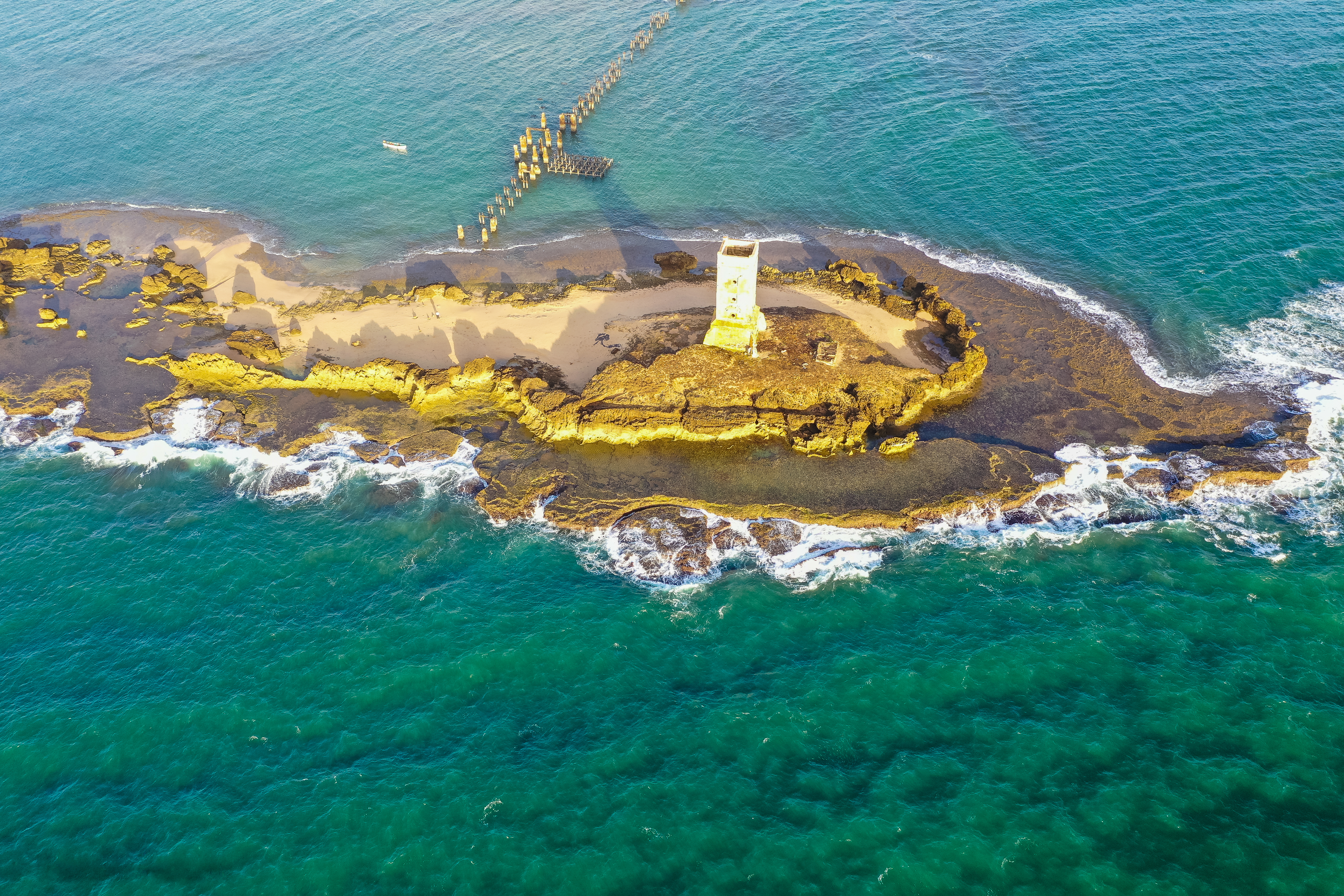
- Barawa Beach-front
- Nickname: Barawa
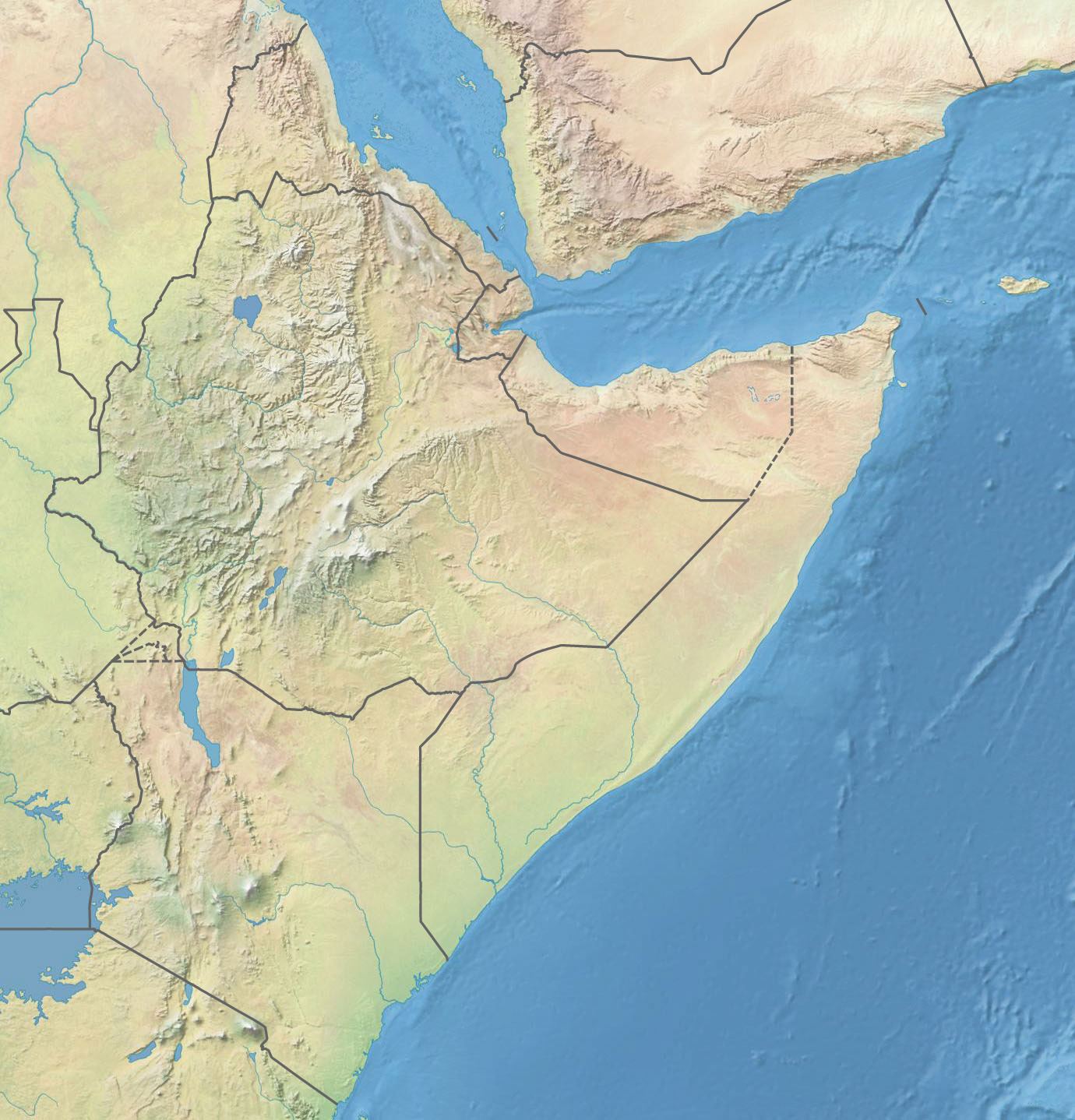
- Location within Somalia Location within the Horn of Africa Location within Africa
- Coordinates: 1°06′48″N 44°01′49″E
- Country: Somalia
- State: South West
- Region: Lower Shabelle
- Districts: Barawa District
- Elevation: 0 m (0 ft)

Population
  - Total: 678,890
- Time zone: UTC+3 (EAT)
- Area code: +252

Barawa (Somali: بَراوِّ Barāwe, Maay: Barawy, Swahili: بَرَأَاوٖ Baraawe, Arabic: ﺑﺮﺍﻭة Barāwa, Italian: Brava), also known as Barawe and Brava, is the capital of the South West State of Somalia. It functions as a port town in the southwestern Lower Shebelle region of Somalia. Facing the Indian Ocean, Barawa serves as the main port of South West State.

== History ==
=== Origin ===
The town of Barawa was founded by Aw-Ali from the Tunni, a member of Rahanweyn. Before Aw-Ali founded Barawa, he had observed a large area between Goobwayn and Baraawe. Aw-Ali was looking for a place that best suited his family needs. One fact Aw-Ali could not resist was the freshness of the ocean breeze and immediately asked the collaboration of his people. Oral history relates that before Aw-Ali moved into the city of Baraawe, most of the Tunni population and their livestock resided in an area not far from Baraawe and its vicinity. Most historians have identified that Aw-Ali himself to be from a Tunni clan.

After Aw-Ali set the groundwork to his new residence, more Tunni moved in to the area, most of them migrated from inland and ocean shores. Oral history recognizes that this group to be the first inhabitants to live in the city of Brava.

=== Medieval ===
==== Tunni Sultanate ====
The Tunni, composed of five sub-clans (Da'farad, Dakhtira, Goygali, Hajuwa, and Waridi), were the latest to drive the Jiddu into the interior, where they established their own Sultanate called Tunni Sultanate. The Tunni made a treaty with the Jiddu so that Tunni settled on the west bank of the Shabelle and the Jiddu settled on the east bank. Both also agreed to resist foreign penetration, to allow only Seddah Saamood (the three foot-prints, which are the Tuni, the Jiddu, and the wild beasts). However, they did accept the first Muslim migrants, the Hatimi from Yemen and the Amawi from Syria, around the 10th century, for both religious and commercial reasons. Barawa founded by a Tunni saint called Aw-Al became the new capital for the Tunni Sultanate. The town prospered and became one of the major Islamic centers in the Horn, the Barawaani Ulama, attracting students from all over the region. Muslim scholars of that time, such as Ibn Sa'id, wrote about Barawa as "an Islamic island on the Somali coast." Al-Idrisi also described the construction of the coral houses and noted that Barawa was full of both domestic and foreign commodities.

Barawa was renowned for its domestic craftsmen and their weaving of alindi/ kioy cloth, and the kufi baraawa . Alongside sandals, weapons and utensils many things are still handmade in the town. Clay horned stones are common in Buur Heybe. With unique carving and for goods such as the mihmil (Qu'ran rest)) and Attir or wedding bed. Precious metals were honed into fine jewellery and metal lined bridges which would connect multi-storied houses above. Women and the elderly would not need to go into the crowded streets to get across the town. Coral was collected and then torched to add as a lime component.

==== Ajuran Sultanate ====
Barawa and its surrounding area fell under the Ajuran Empire that governed much of southern Somalia and eastern Ethiopia. The domain extended from Hafun in the north, to Qelafo in the west, to Kismayo in the south.

Barawa was at its golden age during Ajuran period. According to Ibn Sa'id in the thirteenth century described Barawa as one of the three most important cities on the East African coast along with Mogadishu and Merca all serving as the commercial and Islamic centers for the Indian Ocean. In 1430, Barawa was one of only 18 western ports mentioned by name in an imperial decree that was issued by the Xuande Emperor, it was named as Pu-la-wa, (不喇哇). From his experiences during the Ming treasure voyages in the early 15th century, the Chinese mariner Fei Xin characterized the people of Barawa as pure and honest.

In 1506, the Battle of Barawa began after the Portuguese Empire decided to invade and capture the wealthy Somali harbour city. The commander of the Portuguese army was Tristão da Cunha: he set wanted to conquer the Ajuran territory, where the battle of Barawa was fought. After a long period of engagement, the Portuguese soldiers burned the city and looted it. However, fierce resistance by the local population and soldiers resulted in the Portuguese failing to permanently occupy the city. Refugees who had fled to the interior eventually returned and rebuilt Barawa, Tristão da Cunha was wounded in this battle. After the battle, the city of Barawa quickly recovered from the attack.

=== Early modern period ===
In the early modern period, Barawa was ruled by the Geledi Sultanate. It was considered the chief port for the kingdom. The city was roughly 4/5th Somali and 1/5th Bravanese with the majority of Somali inhabitants being Tunni.

Geledi Sultan Ahmed Yusuf's brother Abobokur received a regular tax from the townspeople on behalf of the Sultan this was noted in 1876 in a British Parliamentary account

The Somali tribe of Ruhwaina. The Chief of this and other tribes behind Brava, Marka and Mogdisho is Ahmed Yusuf, who resides at Galhed, one day's march or less from the latter town. Two days further inland is Dafert, a large town governed by Aweka Haji, his brother. These are the principal towns of the Ruhwaina. At four, five, and six hours respectively from Marka lie the towns of Golveen (Golweyn), Bulo Mareerta, and Addormo, governed by Abobokur Yusuf, another brother who though nominally under the orders of the first-named chief, levies black-mail on his own account, and negotiates with the governors of Marka and Brava direct. He resides with about 2,000 soldiers principally slaves at Bulo Mareta; the towns of Gulveen which he often vists and Addormo being occupied by somalis growing produce, cattle &c. and doing a large trade with Marka. The brother of Sultan Ahmed, Abobokur Yusuf managed the lands opposite the Banadir ports of Brava & Marka and also received a tribute from Brava. This Abobokur Yusuf was accustomed to send messengers to Brava for tribute, and he drew thence about 2,000 dollars per annum.

Eventually, in 1908, Barawa came under the Italian protectorate and was then incorporated into Italian Somaliland in 1910 after the death of the last Sultan Osman Ahmed.But the Italians faced stiff resistance from many parts of the Banadir coast. The inland regions and the trade of the Somali merchants would remain unchallenged in their independence for years to come.

Sheikh Uways al-Barawi organized an Ikhwaan and led the Banadir revolt, which was defeated in the 1908. Sheikh Uways migrated to Biyole to re-organize his Ikhwaan, but was killed in 1909 by Mohammed Abdullah Hassan due to religious disputes. His successor, Khalif Sheikh faraj, was also killed in 1925. However, the Uwaysiyya order, named after the martyr Sheikh Uways, emerged throughout southern Somalia and East Africa, establishing the Jama'a in the riverine region of southern Somalia and neighboring regions. These served as centres of charity and learning.

=== Modern ===
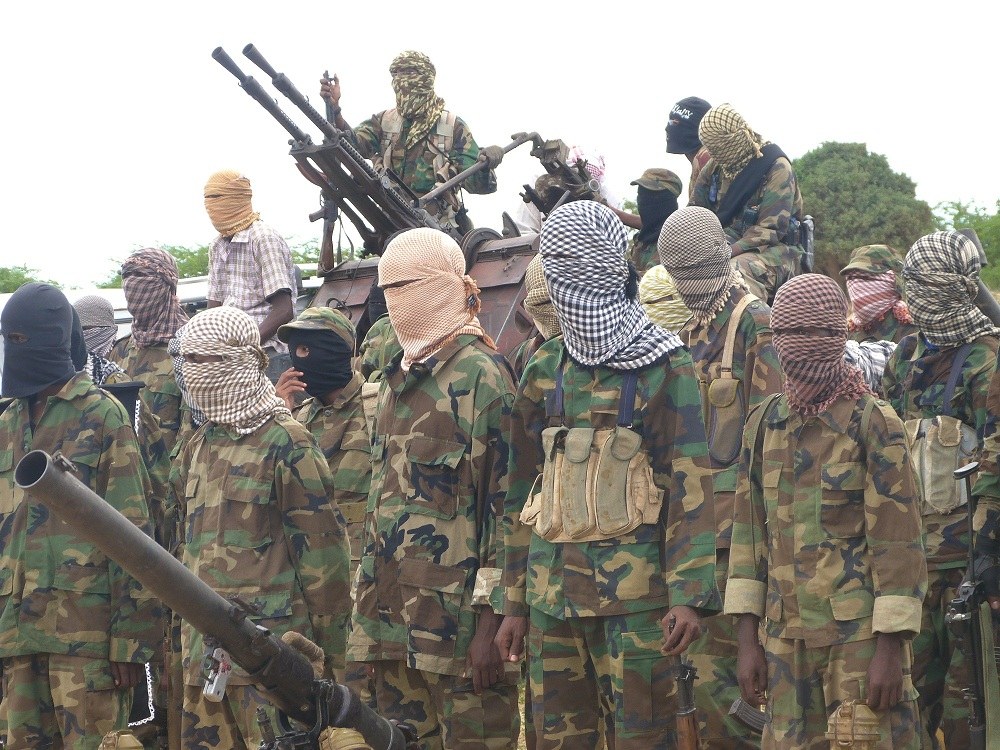
Al-Shabaab fighters in the city of Barawe in 2013

In addition to Sheikh Uways, Baraawe has produced numerous well-respected Ulama, including Sheikh Uways al-Barawi, Sheikh Nureini Ahmed Sabir, Sheikh Haji Sadiq, Sheikh Qassim al-Baraawi, Sheikh Mu'alim Nuuri, Sharif Qulatayn and a female poet-saint, Dada Masiti.

The city was the stronghold of the Hizbiya Digil-Mirifle (HDM) party, which was founded in 1947; it later became the Hizb al-Dastuur Mustaqil al-Somali where the first Election has taken place in Mogadisho, Hisbia (Xisbiya) and has been elected as the leader of (HDMS) Jeilani Sheikh Bin Sheikh (Somali Independent Constitutional Party, HDMS).

Barawa sharply declined after upgraded colonial infrastructure was added in Merca and Mogadishu. After independence the town was largely ignored by the Somali government. Following refugee resettlement programmes the town suffered as the new arrivals were unable to quickly adopt the culture of the city. Heritage was lost following the civil war which Siad Barre and Morgan’s militias looting the town. In 1997 it was incorporated into South West State of Somalia and rebuild would have ensued but the emergence of Al-Shabaab stalled this.

In 2009, Al-Shabaab militants seized control of Barawa. In September of that year, a United States military raid in the area killed Saleh Ali Saleh Nabhan, a suspected Al-Qaeda operative.

In October 2013, United States Navy SEAL Team Six launched an unsuccessful raid against a beachside house in Barawa, targeting Mukhtar Abu Zubeyr, the leader of Al-Shabaab. Following the raid, al-Shabaab began a crackdown of the town.

Following the launch of Operation Indian Ocean, the Somali Armed Forces assisted by AMISOM troops re-seized control of Barawa from Al-Shabaab in October 2014. On 11 October, during a trip to Barawa, President Hassan banned the charcoal trade in the city.

== Demographics ==
Barawa has a population of around 260,800 inhabitants. The broader Barawa District has a total population of 350,800 residents.

The town's majority inhabitants are the Tunni clan, a sub-group of Digil, with a minority of residents are Garre, Sheekhaal, Marehan, Bravanese. In addition to the standard Bravanese language (Chimini), which is a dialect of Swahili, the Tunni speak Tunni language (a dialect of Somali) and the remaining people speak the standard Somali language.

== Gallery ==
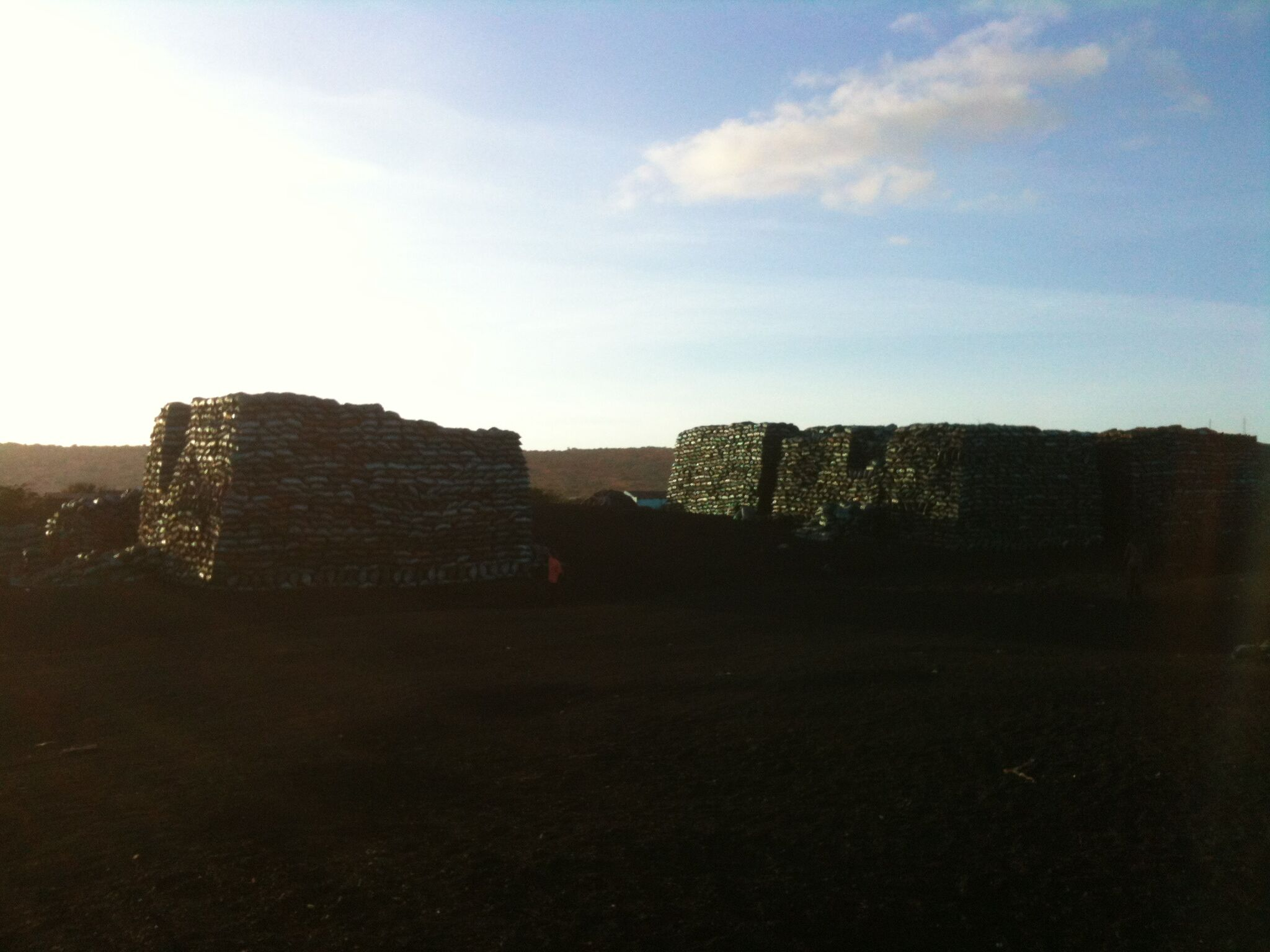
Charcoal in the port

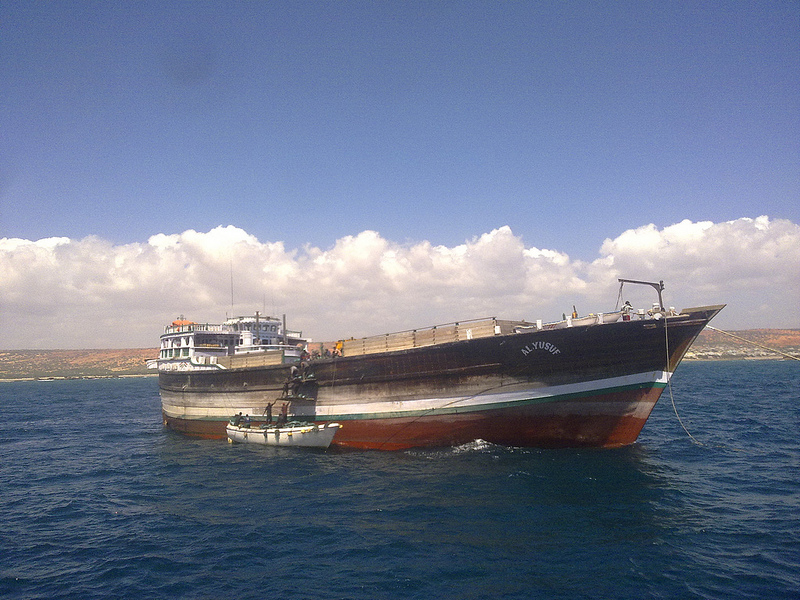
Exporting charcoal by Indian boat

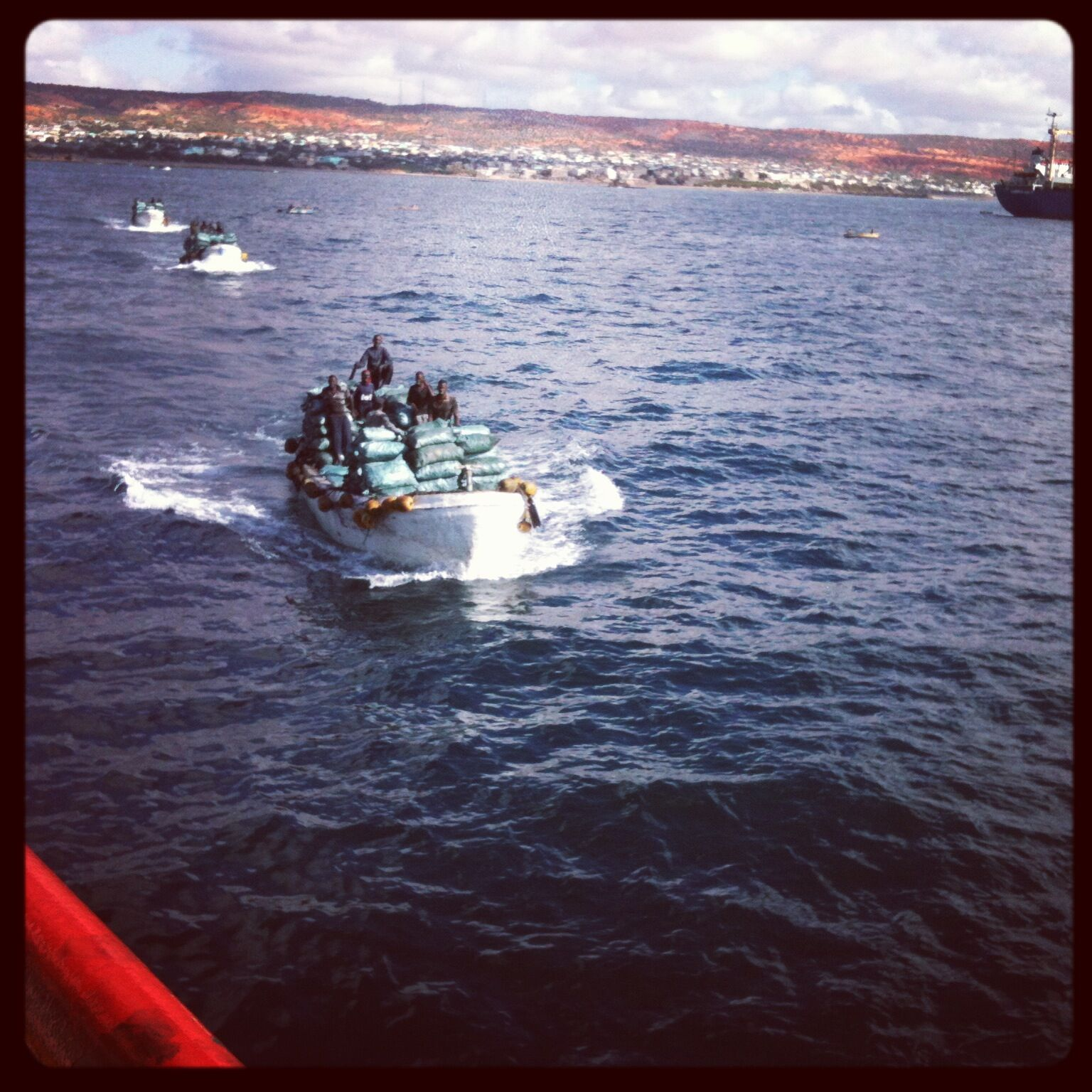
Small boats carrying charcoal to a ship

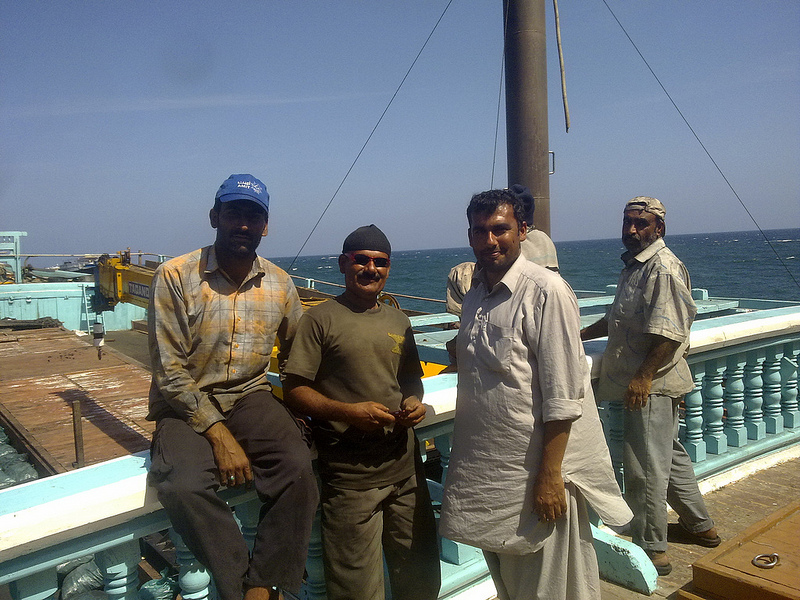
Pakistanis in Varava on their coal trade boat

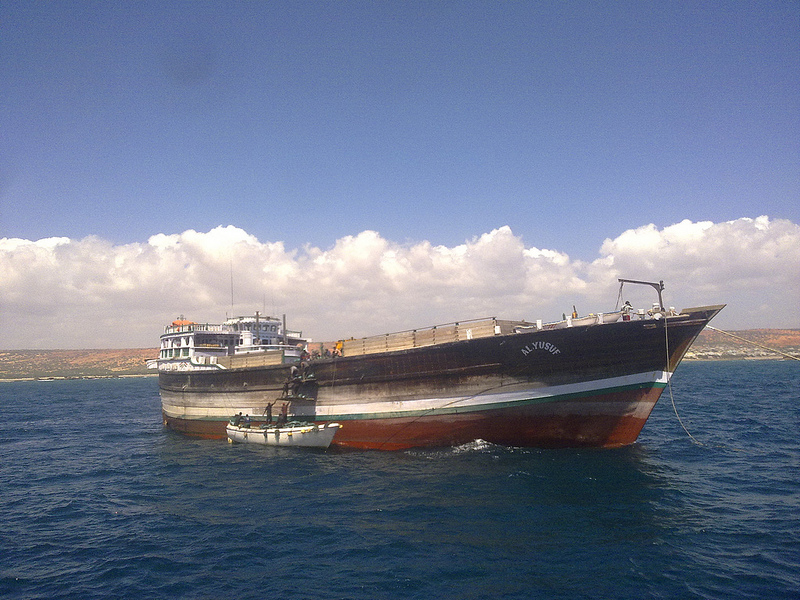
Volvo boat loading coal to a larger vessel

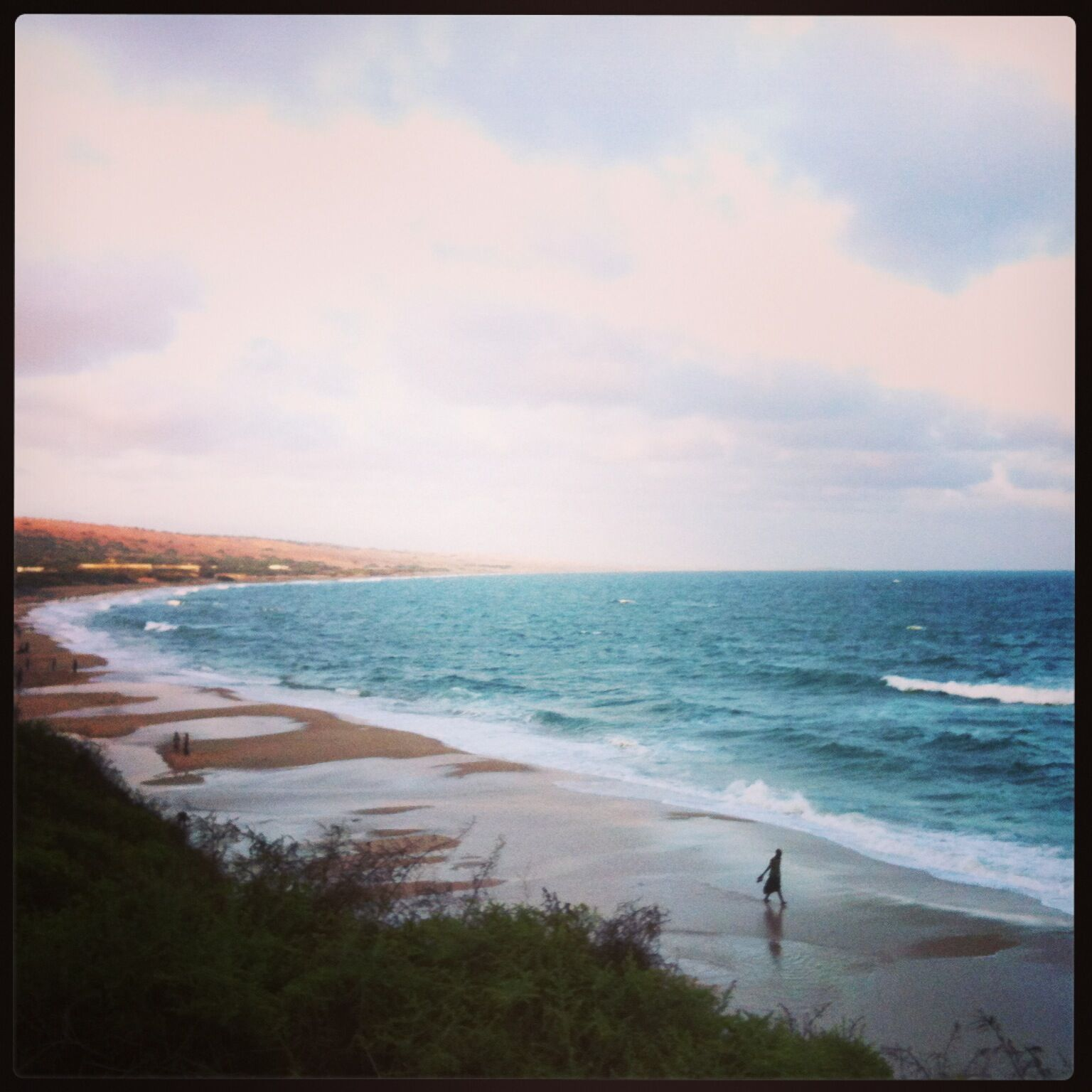
Barawa beach

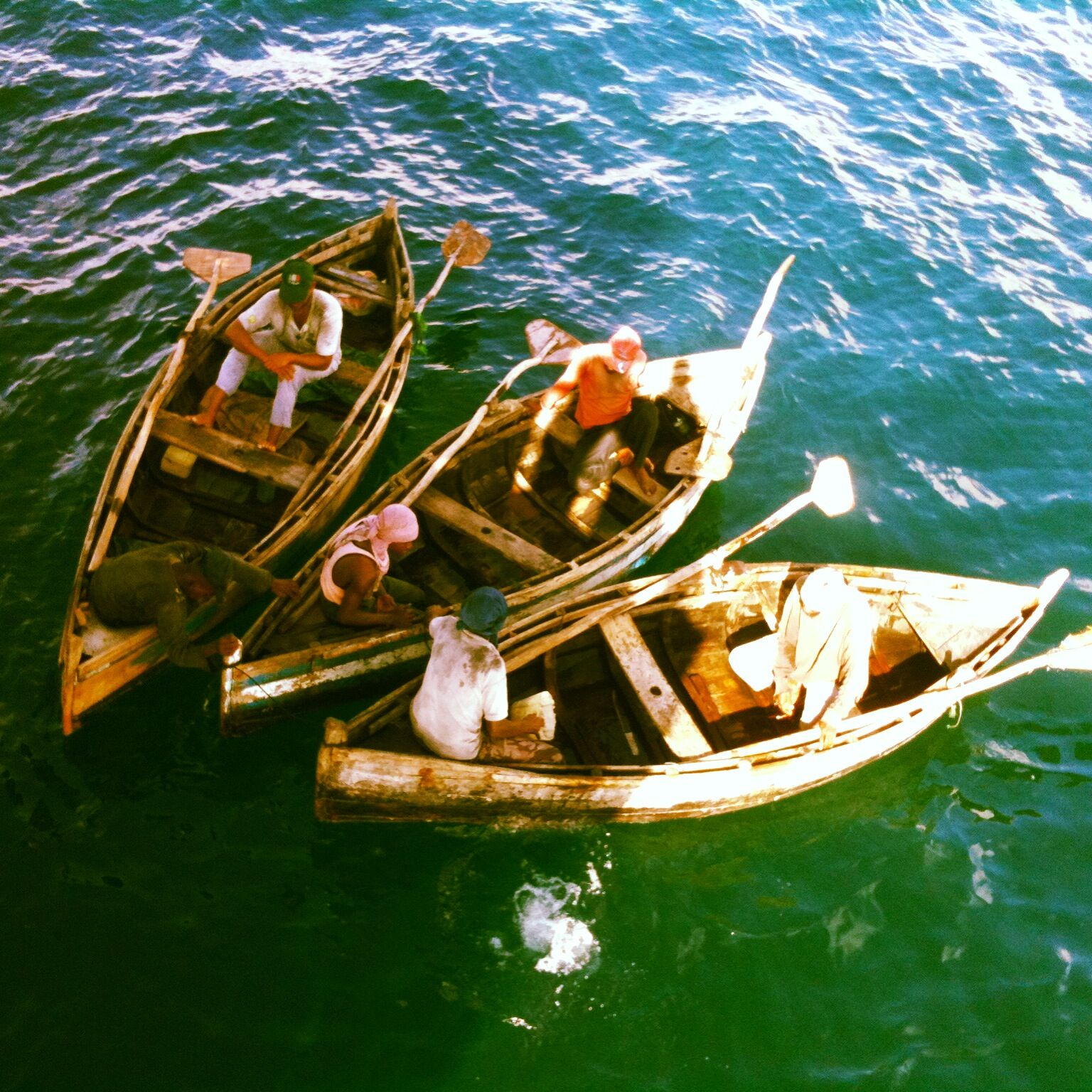
Small fishing boats

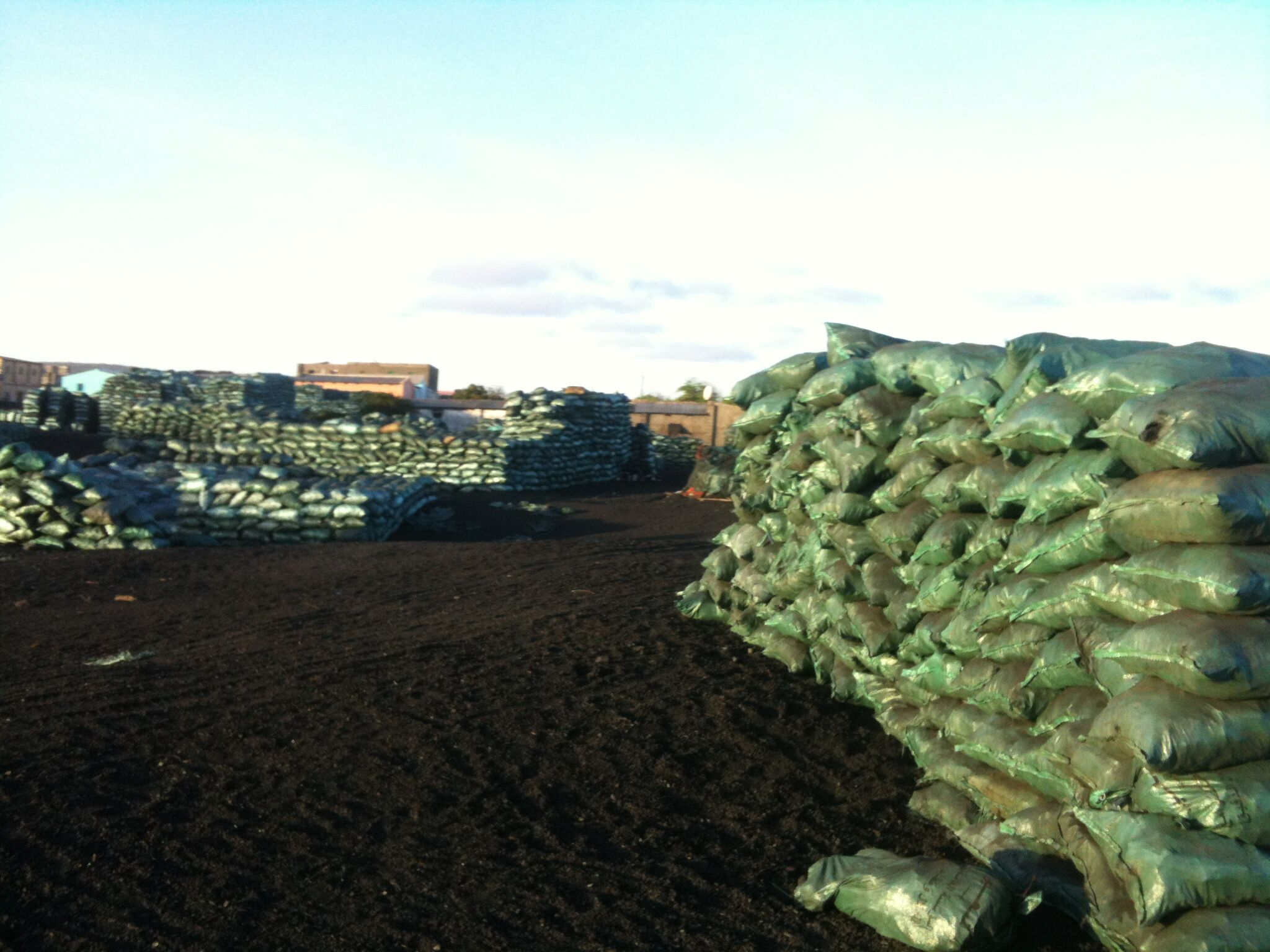
Charcoal in the port awaiting export

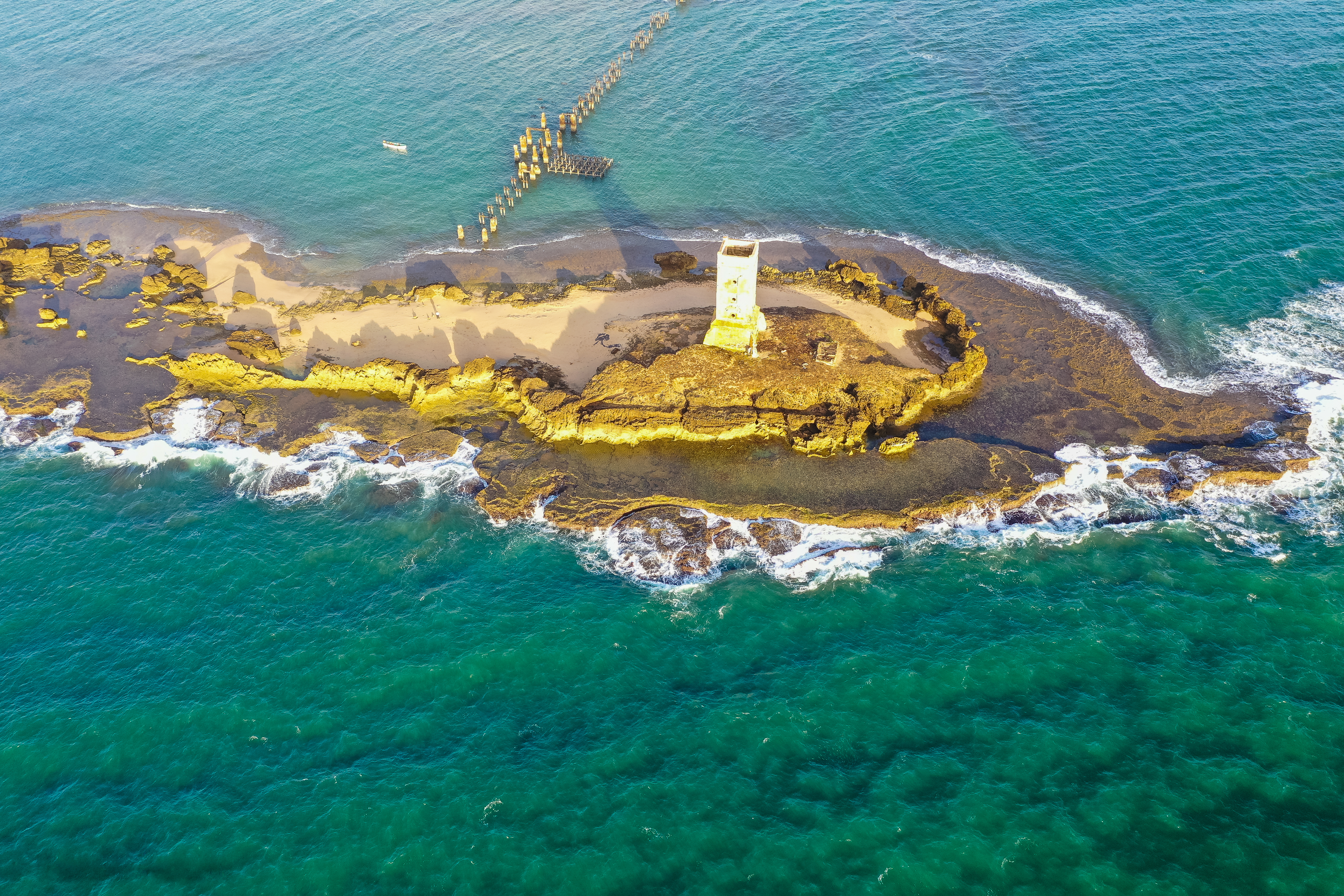
An ancient lighthouse in Baraawe

== Bibliography ==
- Stanley, Henry Edward John (1866). A Description of the Coasts of East Africa and Malabar: In the Beginning of Sixteenth Century by Duarte Barbosa. Printed for the Hakluyt Society.
