= Somali National Front =

Somali revolutionary militia

Somali National Front Dhaqdhaqaaqa Jabhada Soomaliyeed
- Abbreviation: SNF
- Leader: Omar Haji Mohamed; Mohammed Hashi Gani
- Founded: March 1991
- Dissolved: 2001
- Merged into: Transitional National Government
- Headquarters: Kismayo, Somalia
- Ideology: Pro-Barre; Somali nationalism National Reconciliation; Marehan interests
- Religion: Sunni Islam

The Somali National Front (SNF) (Somali: Dhaqdhaqaaqa Jabhada Soomaliyeed) was a politico-military organization that operated in southern Somalia during the Somali Civil War and represented one of the major factions involved in the conflict.

After its creation following the collapse of President Siad Barre's government in 1991, the SNF was largely made up of loyalist remnants of the Somali National Army, along with splinter groups from the Somali Democratic Movement (SDM) and supporters of Barre.

The SNF would eventually merge into the internationally recognized Transitional National Government of Somalia in 2001.

== History ==
=== Origins ===
After the fall of President Mohammed Siad Barre's government in 1991, the Marehan clan formed an armed group called the Somali National Front (SNF). This group was established to protect their people, and clan interests in response to the rising opposition from other Somali clans. some Somali clans had formed before militias such as the Somali National Movement (SNM), Somali Salvation Democratic Front (SSDF), and the United Somali Congress (USC), which were among the main forces that opposed Siad Barre and Marehan clan.

==== Formation (1991) ====
The Somali National Front (SNF) was founded shortly after the collapse of Somalia's central government. Initially, the SNF was composed largely of soldiers from the Somali National Army, whom were from the Marehan clan. The SNF received strong support from the Marehan clan, while other factions were backed by Ethiopia. The SNF provided refuge to other Darood clans fleeing from Mogadishu during the civil war. Following the collapse of the central government, the SNF successfully took control of five regions in Somalia Bay, Middle Juba, Gedo, Lower Shabelle, and Lower Juba. Their primary objective was to recapture the capital, Mogadishu. However, internal disputes within the SNF leadership ultimately prevented them from seizing Mogadishu from the Hawiye clan, which had become one of the dominant factions in the city. These internal conflicts weakened the SNF's efforts and influence in the broader struggle for control in these Important regions.

During those years, the Somali National Front (SNF) was considered the most powerful faction among the various armed groups operating at the time. They were well-equipped, using weapons from the Somali National Army. The SNF's power was further strengthened by the fact that many of its members were former national soldiers, giving them a strategic edge in terms of organization and military expertise over the other factions active in Somalia at that time.

==== Defeat and Resurgence (1992–1993) ====
In March to April 1991, heavy fighting broke out between the United Somali Congress (USC) and SNF forces. The SNF lost control of Kismayo, one of Somalia's largest and most strategic cities, and was consequently forced to withdraw to the city of Bardera and parts of the Gedo region. However, in November 1991 to March 1992, the SNF advanced back into the territory it had lost months earlier, taking advantage of infighting among its opponents. This action prompted the creation of the opposing Somali Liberation Army (SLA), a military coalition composed of numerous rebel groups led by General Mohamed Farah Aidid. The SLA would later become the precursor to the Somali National Alliance (SNA), another significant faction in the Somali Civil War that the SNF would come into direct conflict with. During this period the SNF suffered serious internal divisions. Two factions from within were in contention, one led by President Siad Barre and the other by Gen. Muhammad Hashi Gani. Tensions got to the point where both men openly denounced each other in front of television crews in March 1992.

In April 1992 the SNF was decisively defeated by Aidid's SLA forces, and former President Siad Barre fled from Somalia via the Kenyan border on 27 April. Later in the year, following the recent formation of the SNA led by Aidid, his prime rival, Ali Mahdi Muhammad of the Somali Salvation Alliance (SSA) began supporting the SNF in an attempt to create his own pan-clan alliance.

In early 1993, the SNF began gaining a foothold in Somalia again. Around the same period fighting broke out in the Galkayo region between the Aidid's SNA and the Somali Salvation Democratic Front (SSDF) led by Abdulahi Yusuf Ahmed. In response, SNF forces under the command of Morgan entered the Galguduud region to support the SSDF. At around the same time fighting broke out between Morgan's forces at the strategic port city of Kismayo and the American and Belgian UN forces deployed there.

=== 1994 to 2001 ===
Following a series of clashes with the Somali Democratic Movement (SDM) in early 1994, a conference was organized by communities in the Gedo and Bay regions. The conference was attended by representatives of the SNF and the SDM, as well as a large number of community elders, clan leaders, and intellectuals from both regions. The purpose of the conference was to reconcile the SNF and the SDM and to unite the peoples of the two communities, and it was largely successful in achieving these goals.

==== Governance ====
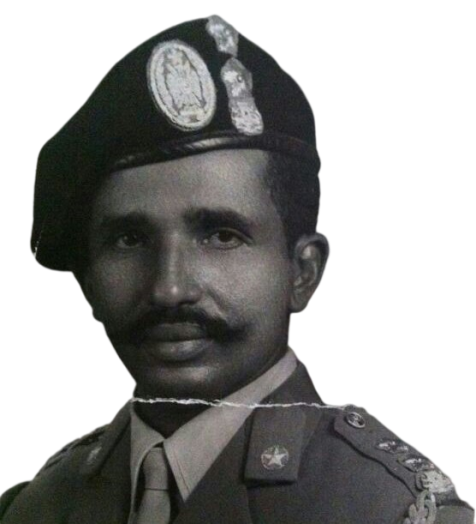
Political Leader of the SNF, Omar Haji Masallah in 1973

For most of the civil war, the SNF governed and conducted operations in the Gedo region of southern Somalia. In an effort to restore order in the area, the SNF supported the creation of an Islamic Sharia court to resolve disputes and a police force to maintain order. As a result, a relatively effective governing administration was established in the region. The SNF's political leadership, led by former Defense Minister General Omar Haji Masallah, was based in Nairobi, Kenya, while the military wing was led by General Mohammed Hashi Ghani based in the city of Luuq, Gedo. The organization would be consistently represented at all major national reconciliation and peace conferences over the 1990s.

Although the SNF was primarily made up of members of the Marehan sub-clan of the Darod, it reportedly had significant support in the region, despite the presence of non-Darod and non-Somali minority groups in the Juba and Dawa river basins. Initially, the SNF had tried to use Siad Barre's name and legacy to rally for support, but found that this was generally counterproductive to their efforts among Somalis outside the Marehan clan.

In 1991, a faction of the Somali Democratic Movement (SDM) broke away and merged with the SNF. Later, under General Omar Haji Masallah, the SNF achieved some of its major political goals by uniting the Marehan with other Darod clans led by General Mohammed Said Hersi Morgan.

==== Conflict with Al-Itihaad al-Islamiya and early Sharia Courts (1994–1996) ====
Like Aidids SNA and Ali Mahdi's SSA, the SNF also began opposing the rising strength of the Islamic courts appearing in southern Somalia. A sharia court established in Luuq District of Gedo region by Sheikh Mohamed A. Nuur in 1992 (with the blessing and support of the SNF) reportedly had more success than the courts appearing in Mogadishu at addressing lawlessness. Consequently Luuq District was considered to be one of the safest places in Somalia. Concerned with the sharia courts rising popularity and authority, the SNF and the Ethiopian military collaborated to destroy the Gedo Islamic Court, resulting in an increase of inter-clan warfare in the region.

On 10 August 1996 heavy fighting erupted near Kenya's border city of Mandera during clashes between Al-Itihaad al-Islamiya (AIAI) and the SNF, backed by Ethiopian Air Force helicopter gunships. While pursuing AIAI, SNF and Ethiopian forces had allegedly crossed the border and Mandera was inadvertently bombed three times during the battle resulting in the death of a Kenyan soldier. This would lead to the imposition of a curfew on the North Frontier District and the Kenya Defence Force being put on full alert.

==== Fracture, Ethiopia and conflict with Jubba Valley Alliance ====
In the late 90s the SNF had fractured into pro and anti-Ethiopian factions. In 1999, Ethiopia made another incursion into Somalia in support of a breakaway faction within the SNF in conflict with the original SNF led by General Omar Haji, which Ethiopia had previously supported against AIAI and the Islamic courts. During June 1999, SNF forces fought against the ENDF.

That same year, the SNF would entirely lose control of Gedo region when a military coalition united under the banner of the Allied Somali Force (later named the Jubba Valley Alliance) launched an offensive in the area.

==== Merger with Somali government (2001) ====
In June 2001, SNF would merge into the Transitional National Government of Somalia (TNG).

== Bibliography ==
- Dool, Abdullahi (1998). Failed States: When Governance Goes Wrong!. United Kingdom: Horn Heritage Publications. ISBN 0952524198. OCLC 46322465.
