= Luuq =

- City
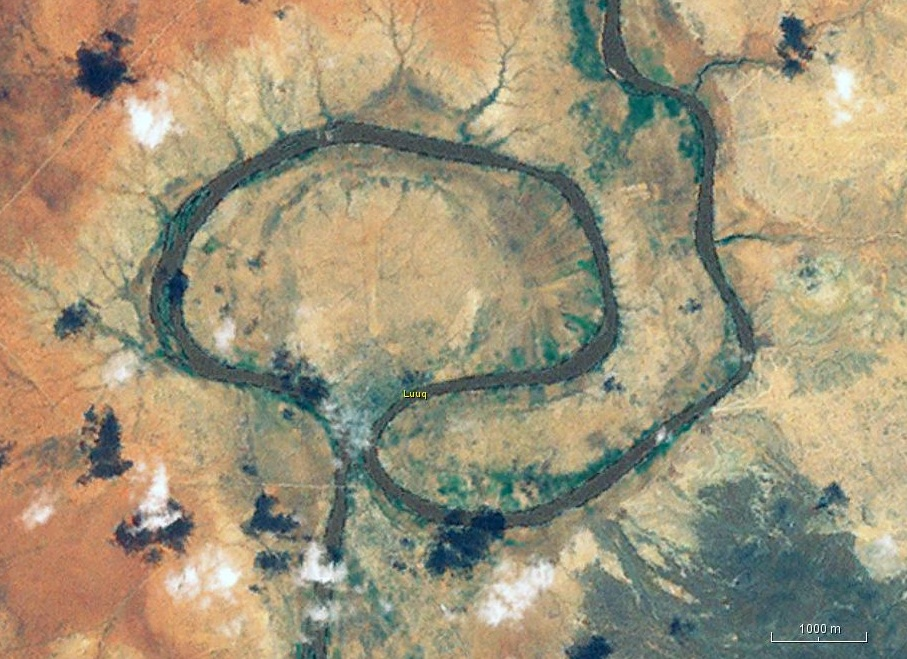
- The town Luuq on a half island of Juba river

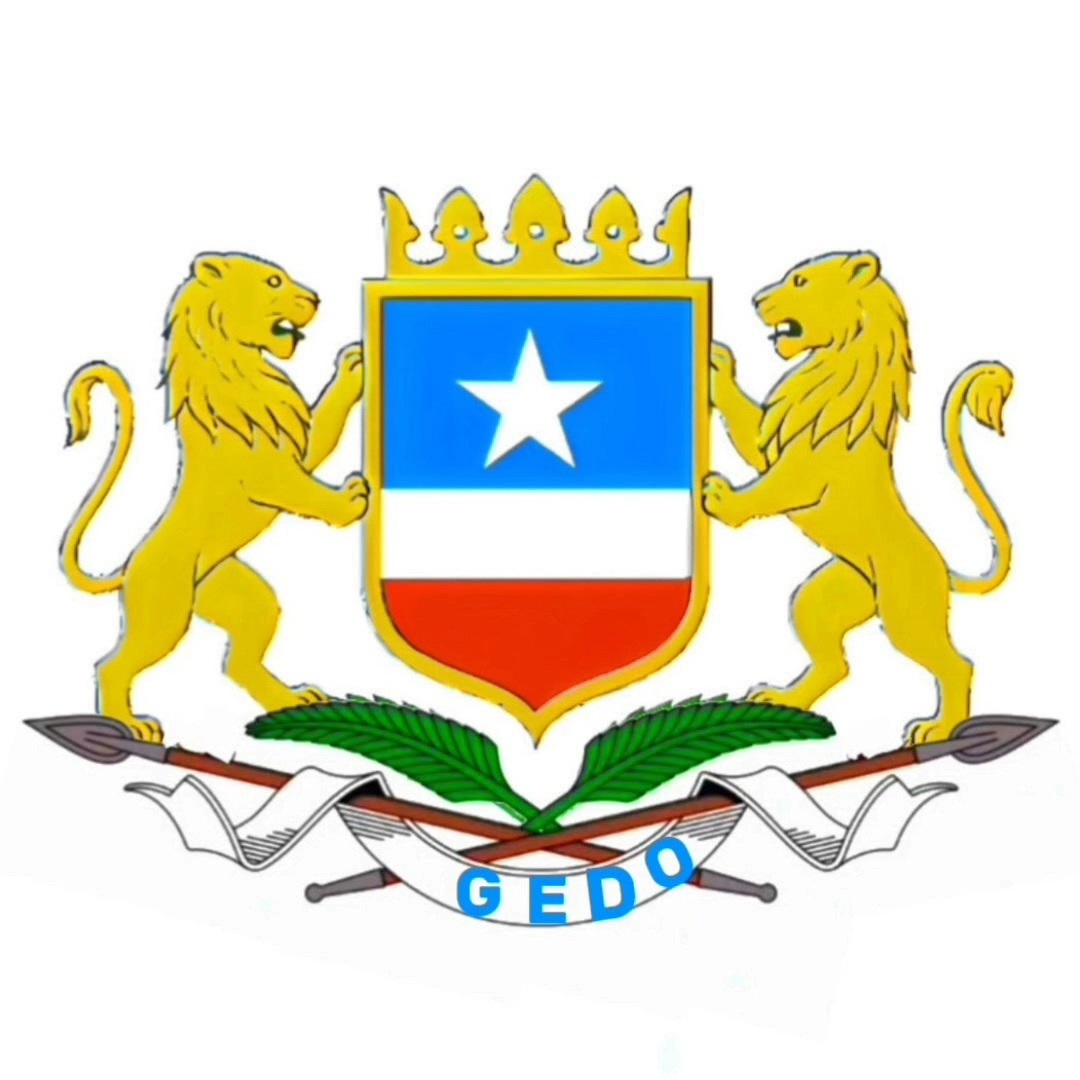
- Seal

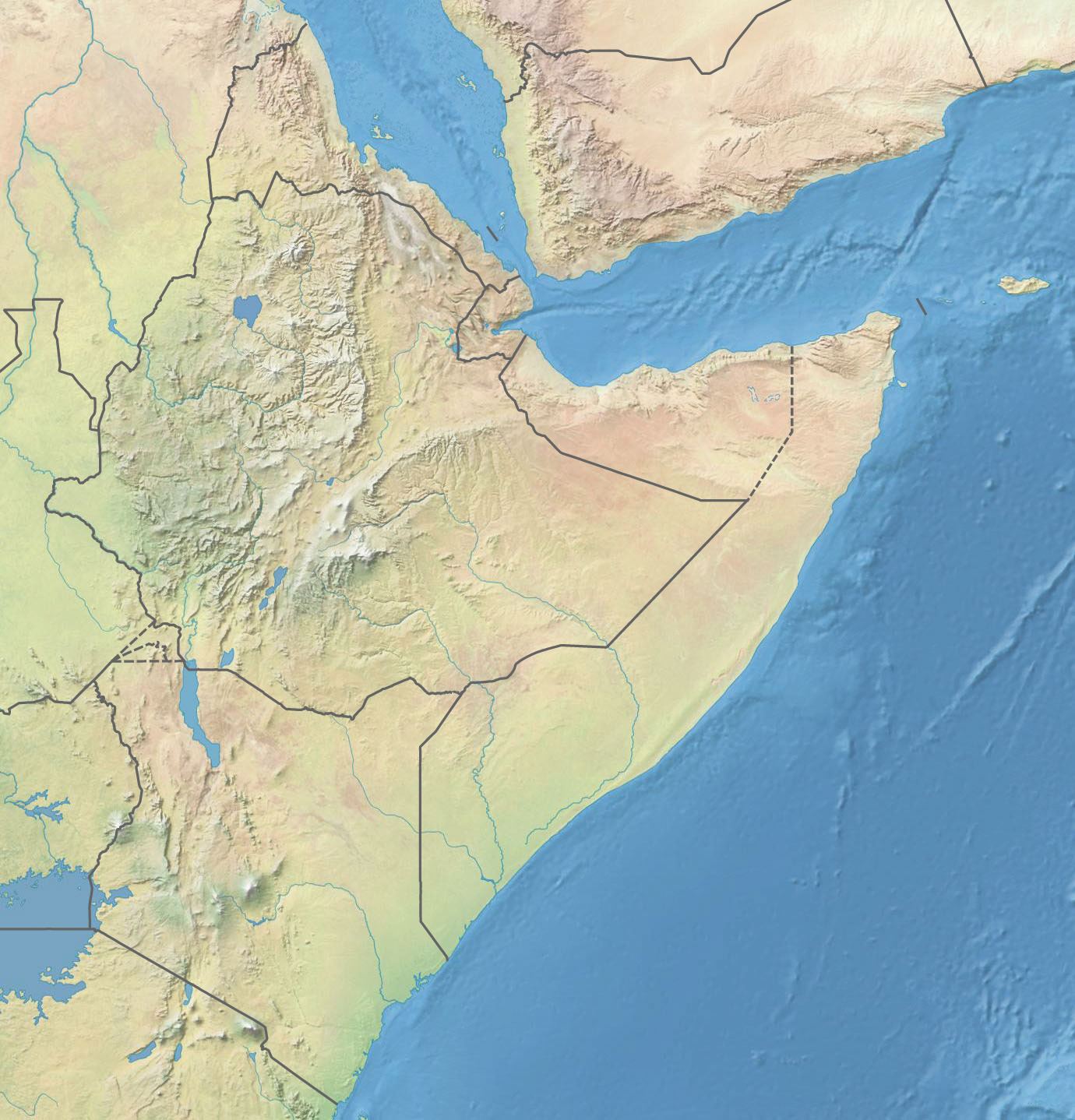
- Location within Somalia Location within the Horn of Africa Location within Africa
- Coordinates: 3°41′53″N 42°35′50″E
- Country: Somalia
- State: Gedo
- Capital: Garbahaarreey

Population
  - Total: 134,000
- Time zone: UTC+3 (EAT)

Luuq (Somali: Luuq, Arabic: لوق, Italian: Lugh) is a city in the southwestern Gedo province of Somalia. It is one of the older settlements in the area. It is the seat of the Luuq District. The town is located in a bend of the Ganana River, where the watercourse flows down from north to south in a horseshoe shape. Luuq is also known as Luuq Ganaane.

== Overview ==
The name Luuq in the Somali language means "alley" by virtue of the city's geographical setting. The river has great influence on the city and its surrounding areas. The entrance of the city gate is situated not more than 100 meters from the river banks on both the eastern and western sides of the town. About 4 km past the city center and main Luuq Market, the river encloses the city again completely.

== History ==
=== Medieval ===
With the expansion of coastal-interior trade in the south, both the coastal town of Benadir and its inland sister "town of Luuq" on upper Jubba had grown into an important emporium. The Bender-Luuq caravan trade used the southern region of Ethiopia as an economic catchment area to access new and valued commodities such as coffee, gold, and slaves. In the Shebelle and Jubba valleys, the emergence of the political power of the gasaargude saldante coincided with this period of southern expansion of the interior caravan trade which boosted urban centers across the inter-riverine regions. The Ajuran Somalis "established and maintained control over the coastal regions and built roads connecting the interior urban centers which further boosted prosperity in southern Somalia. As the political power grew, so the Ajuran extended their control of the coastal-interior caravan trade reaching Ethiopia."

Among the most important inland market towns were Luuq and Bardera on the Ganana river. Then the goods from the interior were exported as far as Southeast Asia.

=== Early Modern ===
Luuq was one of the most important cities in Geledi Sultanate led by the Gasaaragude dynasty part of the Geledi federation that governed the upper Jubba region. Luuq was the largest city in Jubba river and served as the military center for the kingdom. All prisoners were locked in the Luuq prison facility. Anyone who wanted to join the army were trained in Luuq. All the weapons were made in Luuq. According to captain Thomas Smee in his 1811 report to the authorities of British India wrote the city was heavily fortified and had over 2 thousand stone houses with mosques, roads including palaces, and castles in the center.

According to Scott Rees, the importance of the locally made cotton cloth Futa Benaadir "lay in its exchange". The inland commercial centers in Jubbaland "formerly a seat of flourishing and extensive trade, and a commercial and enterprising people" and the coastal commercial nodes of the Benadir, particularly Barawa, provided goods for the interior markets. The caravans from the Benadir stopped in Bale to attract trade goods from the surrounding regions. Cattle barter for "expensive beads, copper, and better quality goods" was popular. The traders of Luuq "reached such sophistication that [they had] a highly developed system of weights and measures, credit was available, and written contracts were signed between the merchants the caravans who carried their merchandise into the interior". The importance of Luuq was its proximity to the Arsi and Borana regions. Market transactions between Luuq-based Somali traders and the Oromo pastoralists were complex in terms of methods used to obtain ivory, the most valued trade item, from the interior: "Somali traders (Rahaween tribe) would first have to exchange cotton cloth for cattle from the Oromo herdsmen. The cattle were then traded to the hunters for ivory."

=== Colonial Period ===
Luuq came under indirect Italian control by 1907, and Italian interest in the town was serious enough for them to demarcate the only segment of the Somali-Ethiopian boundary in order to include Luuq as part of Italian Somaliland.

=== Modern ===
After independence in 1960, the city was made the center of the official Luuq District and served as the political center for Gedo region.

After the collapse of the Somali Democratic Republic in 1991, a Sharia court was opened in Luuq and the surrounding district came to be one of the safest regions in Somalia during the civil war. The town was later governed by Al-Itihaad Al-Islamiya until its administration was toppled by Ethiopian troops in 1996.

On March 7, 2011, Transitional Federal Government forces and allied militia captured Luuq from Al-Shabaab rebels, encountering little or no resistance.

In 2013, Luuq and other settlements in the wider Gedo region were officially incorporated into the newly formed Jubaland autonomous state.

== Demographics ==
Luuq has a population of around 41,000 inhabitants. The broader Luuq District has a total population of 185,703 residents.

== Climate ==
Luuq has a hot desert climate (Köppen climate classification BWh). It has two very short rainy seasons, in April/May and October/November, due to the passages of the Intertropical Convergence Zone. However, these two rainy seasons are extremely unreliable even vis-à-vis other similar hot and arid regions of the globe. Averages high temperatures exceed 40 °C (104 °F) in March, the hottest month of the year. Averages high temperatures remain above 33 °C or 91.4 °F during July and August, the least hot months of the year. Averages low temperatures are always above 20 °C or 68 °F throughout the whole year. Annual average rainfall is only 272 millimetres or 10.71 inches and the city receives just too little annual rainfall to achieve a “semi-arid” climate classification. Luuq is one of the hottest places year-round on Earth as the annual daily mean temperature exceeds 30 °C or 86 °F. The sky is almost always clear year-round and fair weather is extremely reliable.

Climate data for Luuq
Month	Jan	Feb	Mar	Apr	May	Jun	Jul	Aug	Sep	Oct	Nov	Dec	Year
Mean daily maximum °C (°F)	38.6 (101.5)	39.6 (103.3)	40.5 (104.9)	38.3 (100.9)	36.0 (96.8)	35.0 (95.0)	33.5 (92.3)	33.8 (92.8)	36.0 (96.8)	37.1 (98.8)	37.5 (99.5)	37.8 (100.0)	37.0 (98.6)
Daily mean °C (°F)	31.5 (88.7)	32.3 (90.1)	33.2 (91.8)	31.8 (89.2)	30.3 (86.5)	29.5 (85.1)	28.2 (82.8)	28.2 (82.8)	29.6 (85.3)	30.5 (86.9)	30.5 (86.9)	30.5 (86.9)	30.5 (86.9)
Mean daily minimum °C (°F)	23.8 (74.8)	24.5 (76.1)	25.3 (77.5)	25.0 (77.0)	24.8 (76.6)	23.8 (74.8)	23.1 (73.6)	22.6 (72.7)	23.5 (74.3)	23.7 (74.7)	23.7 (74.7)	23.0 (73.4)	23.9 (75.0)
Average rainfall mm (inches)	1.0 (0.04)	1.0 (0.04)	18.0 (0.71)	82.0 (3.23)	52.0 (2.05)	2.0 (0.08)	2.0 (0.08)	1.0 (0.04)	3.0 (0.12)	48.0 (1.89)	50.0 (1.97)	12.0 (0.47)	272 (10.72)
Source: Luuq Climate

== Notable people ==
- Mohamed Omar Salihi (1952-2021) - marine scientist and engineer
- Suud Olat is a Somali American actor, refugee activist and storyteller. When he was just six months old, Suud and his family were forced to leave their entire life behind and flee to neighboring Kenya after civil war broke out in his native Somalia.
