= Benadiri people =

Ethnic group in Somalia

Banaadiri people البنادريون
Total population
- 500,000 (2025) –1.9 million (2021)

Regions with significant populations
- Mogadishu, Merca, Baraawe, Kismayo, Gendershe, Jaziira and other towns in Koonfuur Galbeed

Languages
- Somali (Benadiri, Mahdoonte), Chimwini

Religion
- Islam

Related ethnic groups
- Bajuni, Bravanese, Swahili, Somalis

The Banaadiri people (Somali: Reer Benaadir, Arabic: البنادريون) are a people group in Somalia. Banaadiris largely inhabit Somalia's southern coastline. Part of the Banaadiri, especially the Bravanese, speak Chimwini, a Bantu language closely related to Swahili, alongside Somali. The Banaadiri (Banadiri) people are generally considered distinct from ethnic Somalis and their respective clans.

== Overview ==
The Benadiris originate from Arab tribes who settled the southern coast of Somalia and built stone towns for defence and trade. Some group members trace their origins to diverse groups. The latter includes Arab, Indian, Persian, Bantu, and Somali people. Although the Benadiri are sometimes described as the founders of Mogadishu (hence, their colloquial name Reer Xamar or "People of Mogadishu"), the city itself is postulated to be a successor of ancient city of Sarapion.

Reer Xamar were instrumental in helping to consolidate the local Muslim community, especially in the coastal Benadir region. During the colonial period, they were also among the founding members of the Somali Youth League, Somalia's first political party.

== Banaadiri confederates ==
The Banaadiri people split up based on their settlements, which range from Mogadishu to Barawa, named after the towns in which they are based. The largest settlements are Mogadishu (Xamar), Marka and Barawa. In the three big cities, some clans can also be found in other towns' umbrellas, in the example of Haatim, Reer Faqi and Shanshiyo these clans can be found among all 3 towns. (Shanshiyo and Reer Faqi are part of the Biido confederacy in Baraawe)

=== Reer Xamar ===
  - Abakaaro (Haatim sub clan)
  - Reer Sheykh Muuminow
    - Reer Xaaji Maxamed
    - Reer Xaaji Aamin
    - Reer Xaaji Maxamed (....)
  - Abdi Samad
  - Ali Mohamed
  - 'Amuudi
  - Askarey
  - Aydarussi
  - Bandhabow (a confederacy of 7 clans)
    - Amin Khalaafow
    - Bahar Suufi
    - Oontiro
    - Sheybo
    - Quruwaaye
    - Reer Ahmed Nur
    - Ali iyo Mohamed
    - Gudmane
  - Ba Fadal
  - Ba Hamish
  - Ba Sadiq
  - Ba Mukhtar
  - Dhabarweyn (3 clan confederacy)
    - Wabaas (3 clan confederacy)
      - Reer Aw Bakar
      - Reer Misgal
      - Reer Makaran
    - Mohamed Jibril
    - Haaji Qarar
  - Indho Weyne (4 clan confederacy)
    - Reer Rooblow
    - Reer Cali Musa
    - Mussa Haaji
    - Aw Mumin Hassan
  - Moorsho Mariid
  - Qalmashube(3 clan confederacy)
    - Haji Ibrahim
    - Haji Abdi
    - Baaqashwa
  - Reer Faqi
  - Reer Haaji
  - Reer Shiikh
  - Reer Aadan dheere
  - Reer Saddax geedi
    - Reer Cabdulle
    - Reer 'Awaale
  - Shanshiyo
  - Shamsi

Reer Jaziira ( Sheekhaal Jaziira)

  - Reer Xaaji
  - Reer Qaasim
  - Reer Maad

Reer Gendershe ( Sheekhaal Gendershe)

  - Reer Maadsheekh
  - Reer Ibrahim
  - Reer Izgowe
  - Reer Muraad
  - Naakhuude
  - Meheri
  - Gaameedle ( Macalin Faqi Burhaan)

=== Reer Marka ===
Reer Marka are also known as locally and politically as 12 koofi iyo mashayikh (Somali: 12 caps and 3 Sheikhs); there are currently 15 clans in the traditional elder council. With the clan group Reer Maanyo being considered one despite they themselves being a confederation of 4 different clans in the city of Marka.

- The Reer Marka
  - Gaameedle
  - Reer Ahmed Nur
  - Duruqbo
  - Asharaaf Ba Alawi
  - Ashraaf Bin Hassan
  - Ashraaf Mahdali
  - Reer Khadiib
  - Fasahaale (More commonly known as Kafaari)
  - Garjanti
  - Haatim
  - Qalmashube
  - Juunji
  - Reer Manyo
    - Reer Macow (also known as Ba Muqtar)
    - Reer Shaawis
    - Reer Omar
    - Reer 'Aafi (original ethnic group qubeys surre dir)
    - Reer Haaji
    - Reer Hassan
  - Sheekhaal Jaziira
  - Sheekhaal Gendershe
  - Shanshiyo
  - Shukureere
  - Sheekhaal Aw Cusmaan

=== Reer Baraawe ===
- The Reer Baraawe
  - Biido
    - Ra Waali
    - Ra Ma'limu
    - Gabro
    - Ra Mashaanga
    - Reer Faqi
    - Ra Shaqali (Ra Baqtiile, Ra Duressa)
    - Cabdi Shuqaale
    - Ra Bakari (Ra Nurshe, Ra Raabe, Ra Banawari)
    - Ba Sadiq
    - Raa Mkaawu
    - Zimarka
    - Ra Mgumi
  - Haatim
  - Asharaf Ba 'Alawi sada

== Distribution ==
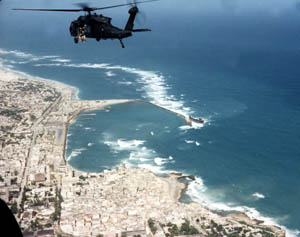
Mogadishu's coast in 1994

The Banadiri people are primarily and traditionally based on the southern coastal towns of Mogadishu, Marka and Baraawe, where Reer Hamar, Reer Marka (12 koofi) and Reer Baraawe confederacies are traditionally based. They can also be found in Warsheikh and other coastal towns between Mogadishu and Baraawe such as Jaziira, Abaay Dhahaan, Dhaanane, Jilib Marka, Gendershe, Munghiya and further south in the town of Kismayo. Off the coast Benadiri people are also found in towns such as Afgooye, Genale, Bulo Burto, Mahadei Weyne, Balcad, Jowhar, Beled Weyne, Diinsor, Bur Hakaba, Baidoa, Bardheere, Buale, Jilib, Jamaame and villages surrounding these towns.

In Mogadishu the Benadiri people are primarily found in the 2 oldest districts of the city: Hamar Weyne and Shingani. However they also have a large presences in adjacent districts to the ancient districts of Mogadishu such as 'Abdiaziz, Shibis, Boondheere, Hamar Jajab, Waaberi and Madina. With the Benadiri presences in these districts being made of both the native reer Xamars and other Benadiri people who had moved to the city after the expansion that came with it being made the capital of Somalia.

Much like Mogadishu the Benadiri people in Merca are primarily based in the oldest part of the city, Saraha and Aw Balle. Much like Mogadishu, the Benadiri clans in Merca also have a huge presence in the newer parts of the towns such as Ruusiya, Beytuuras, 'El Bashiirow and Buulo Jaan. The majority of the benadiri in the town are from member clans of the 12 Koofi confederacy however Bravenese and Reer Hamar people can be found here in Merca, the latter primarily moving to the city after the civil war

In Baraawe, the Bravenese people primarily live in the two oldest towns of Mpayi and Biruune. They also have a presence in Al Bamba, Baghdaadi and Bulo Baazi where they live with groups who are more recent to the town. These towns later on had their names changed by the Siad Barre government, where Biruune and Al Bamba are now Dayax (Somali: Moon), Mpaayi has been renamed Wadajir (Somali: United) and Baghdaad being renamed Hawlwadaag (Somali: Work-sharing). These name changes under the nationalist socialist regime mainly came about to deny the peculiarities of the history of that city compared to other cities in Somalia.

In the hinterlands of the coast these groups from Mogadishu, Merca and Baraawe are primarily found in trading hubs such as; Afgooye, Bur Hakaba, Baidoa, Wanlaweyne, Jowhar, Diinsoor, Bardheere and Luuq. Many of these communities were established in these places due to trade with the local clans living there or in a lot of the cases being part of a Sufi Jama'ah being found in these towns and their surroundings. In the case of Reer Shaykh Muminoow clan from Hamar Weyne district clan founder is buried in Bur Hakaba and is a Sufi saint for the Rahanweyne local clans in Bur Hakaba, Baidoa and as far as Luuq where they do siyaaro at his grave yearly along with descendants of his from both the hinterlands and the coast.

== Languages ==
The Benadiri community is not a homogenous group in regards to the languages they speak. As the language they speak is usually dictated by the region they hail from than anything.

The 12 Koofi speak a dialect of Somali colloquially referred to as Mahdoonte (Somali: Mahaa rabta, English: What do you want) or as some linguists have named Aff Asharaf and in some communities in Mogadishu. Especially in the historic Shingani district. This dialect according to Benadiri elders is very similar to the Af-Reer Xamar dialect spoken in the Hamar Weyne district and it surrounding districts. As there was a 3-4% difference in the dialects according to some of the elders.

The Bravanese speak the Bravanese language (Chimwiini or Chimini), Northern Dialect of Swahili. Chi- is a prefix denoting "language", and Miini (Mwiini) is the alternative name of Barawa, the Bravanese people themselves would never call the town as Barawa or Brava, but rather as Miini. Chimini is a standard version of the original Bravanese language which is called Chambalazi, the standard Chimini language contains and Arabic. Chambalazi contains some of the oldest Swahili words and dialects, it started to evolve through time and intermixing of other ethnicity and languages. The Barawa language is over 1000 years old, and still spoken today by approximately 30,000 Bravanese, this is due to the preservation of the language by the early scholars in Barawa. Sheikh Qassim al Barawi was the first Bravanese Scholar to start writing standard Chimini, it was written in Persian and Arabic. Throughout history, the language was used to spread Islam in the Swahili Coast, this was done via poetry and Religious books or manuscripts.

== Festivals ==
=== Istaqfuurow ===
Istaqfurow or Istaqfurlow derives form the Arabic word Astaġfiru (Arabic: أَسْتَغْفِرُ) which translates to "seeking forgiveness". Istighfar, seeking forgiveness from Allah is a common practice of Muslims all around the world and you'll hear in everyday conversation between Muslims. Istaqfuro is an annual Benadiri event held in the Hamar Weyne district of Mogadishu when there is high winds and high tides. The festive goers chant "Astaqfuru Rabukum, Innahu Kaana Qaffuura Yursilo Samaa calaykum Mitraaran" a passage from the Quran Surat Nur verse 10 which translates as "Ask Allah forgiveness, for He is forgiving He will send rain from the sky" (Arabic: فَقُلْتُ اسْتَغْفِرُوا رَبَّكُمْ إِنَّهُ كَانَ غَفَّارًا). During this Festival, animals are slaughtered and prayers are said, in search of God‟s forgiveness for transgressions, to ask for the calming of the winds so that ships can sail, and for the rains to come. Despite the locals treating this festival as a festival with Islamic, many believe this festival is a pre-Islamic festival where locals on the coast of southern Somalia. As the festival is a reaction to a natural phenomenon of a particular season, which is linked to the solar calendar and not the lunar which Muslims follow.

=== Shirka ===
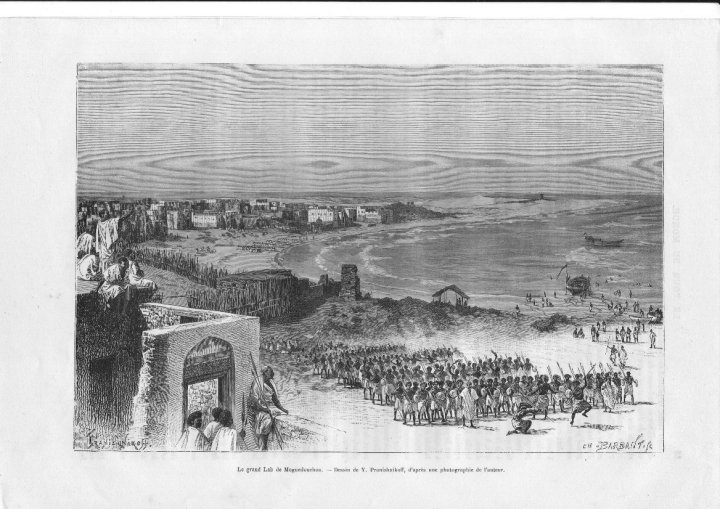
Shirka being done in 1885

The Shirka is a festival that happens annually in the Hamar Weyne district of Mogadishu. This festival is most generally known as dabshiid which translate to lighting of the fire in Somali (Neyrus in Persian). This festival occurs in Mogadishu at the same time as the Istunka in Afgooye, and is so similar as to be the same. The men gather in groups by lineage, and wear different coloured shirts with matching headbands to identify their clan affiliations, they also carry long sticks that they thrust up and down in rhythm as they chant and shuffle through the designated route of the neighbourhoods of Hamar Weyne. At the start of the shir festivities, the Reer Faqi elders, in keeping with their position of neutrality in the community, are called upon to bless the occasion. The festival starts and ends at Jama'a Xamar Weyne, Xamar Weyne near the Moorsho neighbourhood.

== Notable figures ==
=== Religious leaders ===
- ʿAbd al-ʿAzīz alAmawī, was a scholar following the Shāfi'ī school of jurisprudence and was also adviser to several sultans of Zanzibar
- Shaykh Sufi, Abd Al-Rahman bin Abdullah al Shashi (Arabic: عبد الرحمن بن عبد الله الشاشي) (b. 1829 - 1904), popularly known as Sheikh Sufi, was a 19th-century Somali scholar, poet, reformist and astrologist. An annual festival is held for him in the Koodka neighbourhood of Hamar Weyne.
- Dada Masiti, Mana Sitti Habib Jamaladdin (Arabic: مانا ستي حبيب جمال الدين) (c. 1810s – 15 July 1919), commonly known as Dada Masiti ("Grandmother Masiti"), was an Ashraf poet, mystic and Islamic scholar. She composed her poetry in the Bravanese dialect spoken in Barawa.
- Uways Al Barawi, Sheikh Uways b. Mohamed b. Mahadh al-Qādirī (c. 1847–1909) was the foremost sheikh of the Qādiriyyah in Somalia and teacher of Sheikh Qasim
- Sharif 'Aydarus, a famous scholar of Islamic and Somali history and pan-Islamic leader.

=== Politics ===
- Bur'i Mohamed Hamza, was a Somali-Canadian politician. From August 2012 to January 2014, he was a Member of the Federal Parliament of Somalia. He later served as the State Minister of Foreign Affairs and International Cooperation of Somalia from January to October 2014, and subsequently as the State Minister of Finance until December 2014. He was the State Minister of the Premier's Office for Environment at the time of his death.
- Jeylani Nur Ikar
- Abdirashid Mohamed Ahmed, current Petroleum minister of the Federal Government of Somalia and former minister of Commerce and industry.

=== Sports ===
- Ramla Ali, current African Featherweight Champion and the first boxer in history to have won a boxing title whilst representing Somalia.

=== Film ===
- Abdulkadir Ahmed Said, is a prominent Somali film director, producer, screenwriter, cinematographer and editor

=== Art ===
- Amin Amir (Somali: Amiin Caamir, Arabic: أمين أمير) is a Somali-Canadian cartoonist and painter

== See also ==
- Benadir
- Bravanese
- 12 Koofi
