= Shanshiyo =

Ethnic group in Somalia

Shanshiyo الشاشي
Regions with significant populations
- Benadir and Lower Shabelle

Languages
- Af Mahdoonte, Benadiri Somali, Somali, Arabic

Religion
- Islam

Related ethnic groups
- Sheekhaal, Reer faqi, Biido, Asharaf, Bravanese, Tunni and other Benadiri people

'Shanshiyo (Somali: Shanshiyo Arabic: الشاشي) or Shaanshi is a Banaadiri clan, mainly from the southern coastal cities of Mogadishu, Marka, Baraawe and Kismayo which established communities in the hinterlands in towns such as Baidoa and Diinsoor due to trading.

== Overview ==
The clan traces its ancestry to Abd al-Rahman ibn Awf, a close companion of Muhammad. This group along the Benaadir coast first settled in the old quarter HamarWeyne and can still be found predominantly living in the houses around the masjid Awooto Eeday. All Shaanshiyos in Banaadir ancestry trace back to the common ancestor Abubakar Qaffal al-Shashi (from Shaash, which refers to what is now Tashkent)). From here, this group moved to other places along the coast and into the hinterlands of the former Banaadir. In Marka, they are part of the local confederacies called the 12 Koofi (Somali: 12 hats) along with clans such as Duruqbo, Asharaf (Ba 'Alawi, Bin Hassan and Mahdali), Gameedle, Haatim, Reer Khaadib, Shukureere, Juunji, Reer Manyo and Shiikhaal (Gendershe and Jaziira). In Baraawe, they are also found in one of the local clan confederacies called Biido, where the Shanshiyo sub-clan Abdi Shuuqale find themselves part of the Reer Faqi clan who are also originally from Hamar Weyne.

== Notable people ==
- Shaykh Sufi, Abd Al-Rahman bin Abdullah al Shashi (Arabic: عبد الرحمن بن عبد الله الشاشي) (1829–1904), popularly known as Sheikh Sufi, was a 19th-century Somali scholar, poet, reformist and astrologist. An annual festival is held for him in the Koodka neighbourhood of Hamar Weyne.

== See also ==
- Reer Faqi
- Asharaf
- Biido
- Haatim
- Banaadiri people
- 12 Koofi
