= 12 Koofi =

12 Koofi

Regions with significant populations
- Merca, Mogadishu, Baraawe, Kismayo, Jaziira, Gendershe and other towns in Koonfuur Galbeed

Languages
- Mahdoonte, Benadiri Somali, Somali and Chimini

Religion
- Islam

The 12 Koofi, more commonly known as Reer Marka, are a Somali confederation of clans inhabiting the city of Merca and other southern coastal towns of Somalia.

== Overview ==
Reer Marka, also known as 12 Koofi are confederation of clans part of the larger confederacy Benadiri based in the southern port town of Marka. Members of this group of clans can also be found all over southern Somalia, especially coastal towns such as: Mogadishu, Baraawe, Kismayo, Gendershe, Dhanaane, Jilib, Marka and Jaziira.

== Language ==
Reer Marka or the 12 Koofi speak a unique dialect of the Somali language even though Lamberti labelled this the Albakri(duruqbo) dialect the locals call it Mah doonte or Aff May Doonte.

== Clan Tree ==
This group of clans originally was originally made up of 12 clans hence the name 12 Koofi (Somali: 12 Hats/Caps), however over the last century the number of clan groups part of this confederacy has increased due to merchant clans settling in from Baraawe and Mogadishu, also due to some of these Benadiri clans being counted as one and no longer are. In Pentano, 1910 he mentions the groups who live in Merca as:

- Gameedle
- Asharaf 'Alawi
- Asharaf Al-Mahdali
- Asharaf Al-Ahdali(Bin Hassan)
- Reer Al-Ubeidi(Al-Khatib)
- Al-Haatimi
- Duruqbo
- Shanshiyo
- Shukureere
- Juunji
- Kafaari
- Reer Manyo
- Shiikhaal Jaziira and Gendershe

Patano also went on to mention in Marka there were Bravenese people from various clans living there also. According to Hassan Osman Ahmed's "La Citta' di Marka, I Biimaal e il Dominio Sulla Costa Somala" book 12 Koofi are split into 2 groups lixda gibil cad (Somali: 6 lightskin) and lixda gibil madow (Somali: 6 darkskin). These Groups are:

- Gameedle
- Duruqbo
- Shanshiyo
- Haatim
- Asharaf (Bin Hassan, Alawi and Mahdali)
- Shiikhaal (Jaziira and Gendershe)
- Reer Manyo
- Shukureere
- Ahmed Nur
- Kafaari
- Juunji

According to a more recent paper sent to the Federal Government of Somalia the list elders came from 16 different clans and are as follow:

- Ahmed Nur
- Asharaf Alawi
- Reer Manyo
- Duruqbo
- Asharaf bin Hassan
- Shukureere
- Gameedle
- Fasahaale (More commonly known as Kafaari)
- Reer Khadiib
- Haatim
- Shanshiyo
- Garjanti
- Juunji
- Shikhaal Jaziira
- Shikhaal Gendershe
- Shikhaal Aw Osman

== Notable people ==
- Shaykh Ali Maye, a revered Sufi saint of the Duruqbo clan, a yearly festival is held for him outside his shrine in Marka and it ends on the 5 of the Islamic month of Safar.
- Aw Osman Hassan, also known as Aw Usmaan Marki. Synonymous with the Benadiri town of Merca where there's saying "Marka 'Aday Mininka Aw Osman", which translates to as "White Marka House of Aw Osman". He is venerated in not only Marka but all over Lower Shabelle; there is a mosque named after him in the beginning of the city when coming from the former port where annual ziyaaros happen for Aw Usmaan.
- Shaykh Mohamud Hassan, the ancestor of the Reer Ma'ow (Ba Muqtar) clan of the Reer Maanyo confederacy and annual festival is held for him.
- Shaykh Muqtar
- Shaykh Mohamed Shaykh Ali Maye, son of the revered Sufi saint Shaykh Ali Maye buried in Boondhere, Mogadishu.
