= Jaziira (clan) =

Sheekhaal Jaziira شيخال جزيرة
Regions with significant populations
- Benadir and Lower Shabelle

Languages
- Aff Mahdoonte, Benadiri Somali, Maay, Somali and Arabic

Religion
- Islam

Related ethnic groups
- Gendershe , Reer faqi, Biido, Asharaf, Bravanese people, and other Benadiri and Arab people

Sheekhaal Jaziira (Somali: Shiikhaal Jaziira, Arabic: شيخال الجزيرة) also known as Aala Ba Hassan (Somali: Reer Ba Xassan, Arabic: آل باحسن) are a Banaadiri clan mainly from the southern coastal cities of; Jasiira, Jilib Marka, Marka, Mogadishu and Barawa and have established communities in the hinterlands in towns and villages such as Afgooye, Mareerey, Janaale, Shalambood, Galwiin, Wanlaweyn, Buur Hakaba, Baidoa, Moolamaad Baardheere and Xuddur due to trading, da'wah and farming.

== Overview ==
Ba Hassan, who are more commonly known as Sheekhaal Jaziira get their name from the town in which their patriarch first settled in (Jaziira). The tomb of their ancestor Sheekh Mohamed Ba Hassan Az-Zubayri is also buried in this village synonymous with this clan and its destination of siyaaro (pilgrimages) to venerate their ancestor Sheekh Ba-Hassan. This revered ancestor of the Ba Hassan. In Marka they are part of the local confederacy, 12 Koofi & Mashaayikh along with clans such as Sheekhaal Gendershe, Reer Khadiib, Gaameedle, Duruqba, Reer Maanyo, Ashraaf Bin Hassan, Ashraaf Mahdali, Ashraaf Ba Alawi, Hatimi and Shanshiya .
