= Gendershe (clan) =

Banadiri Gendershe جندرشه بنادري
Regions with significant populations
- Banaadir, Lower Shabelle, Bay and Gedo

Languages
- Aff Mahdoonte, Benadiri Somali, Somali and Arabic

Religion
- Islam

Related ethnic groups
- Sheekhaal Jaziira, Shaanshi, Hatimi, Gaameedle, Reer Marka, Reer Faqi, Biido, Asharaf, Bravanese people, and other Benadiri people

Sheekhaal Gendershe (Somali: Benadiri Gendershe Arabic:شيخال جندرشه) also known as Reer Aw Garweyne are a Benadiri clan, mainly from the southern coastal towns of Gendershe, Marka and Mogadishu. The Gendershe have also established communities in the hinterlands in towns such as Afgooye and the villages surrounding it due to trading and farming.

== Overview ==
The Reer Aw Garweyne, who are more commonly known as Sheekhaal Gendershe get their name from the town in which their patriarch first settled in (Gendershe). The tomb of their ancestor Aw Cusmaan Garweyne (big beard) is also buried in this village synonymous with this clan and its destination of siyaaro (pilgrimages) to venerate their ancestor Aw Cismaan.

== Gendershe sub-clans ==
- Reer aw Muraad (mohamed)
- Maad-Sheekh
- Reer Aw-Ibraahim
- Reer Izgoowe
- Naakhude
- Gaameedle
- Reer Mahri

== Notable people ==
- Maxamed Sheekh Jamaal Cabdulaahi, Mayor of Mogadishu from 1956 to 1960 and the first Somali mayor of the city.
- Ughaz Cabdulqaadir Xussen - President of Sheekhaal Gendershe Clan
- Maxamed Xusseen Cali (Shiiqaalow) - Somali National Football Player
- Cabduraxmaan Sheekh Maxamed (Aw Koombe) - Comedian
- Jaarlees Cadde - Comedian
- Sheekh Maxamed Sh. Cabduraxmaan Abba Xaaji - First Teacher at Somali Youth League school
- Sheekh Cusmaan Sheekh Cabdiqaadir - First Somali Pilot
- Maxamed Sheekh Aanis - Somali Singer
- Amiinullaahi Maxamed Sh. Jamaal - First Translator for the Federal Parliament of Somalia
- Sheekh Muxyidiin Sheekh Maxamed Sheekh Isaaq Al Gendershi - Qadi of Mogadishu
- Maxamed Sheekh Cabdi Sheekh Cusmaan - Member of Federal Parliament of Somalia
