= Juunji =

Juunji جونجي
Regions with significant populations
- Lower Shabelle

Languages
- Aff Mahdoonte, Benadiri Somali, Somali and Arabic

Religion
- Islam

Related ethnic groups
- Reer faqi, Biido, Asharaf, Bravanese people, and other Benadiri people

Juunji (Somali: Juunji Arabic:جونجي) are a Benadiri/12 Koofi clan mainly from the southern coastal city of Marka.

== Overview ==
According to Pantano (1910:15). "The Giungiu came from Hirab, after I Biimaal, about 200 years ago". The Juunji live in the east of the town of Marka with the Reer Maanyo in Awbaale, where they have small work huts near the fish market. The Juunji are traditionally blacksmiths and make knives and other metal products in these small work huts, but due to the dishonourable status given to blacksmiths in Somali society a lot of the younger generation have taken up other professions such as carpentry and masons.
