= Duruqbo =

Somali clan

Duruqbo دورقبو
Regions with significant populations
- Benadir and Lower Shabelle

Languages
- Aff Mahdoonte, Benadiri Somali, Somali and Arabic

Religion
- Islam

Related ethnic groups
- Reer faqi, Biido, Asharaf, Bravanese people, and other Benadiri people

Duruqbo (Somali: Duruqbo Arabic: دورقبو) are a Benadiri/12 Koofi clan mainly from the southern coastal cities of; Marka and Mogadishu and have established communities in the hinterlands in towns such as Qoryooley due to trading.

== Overview ==
The Duruqbo are clan that come from 2 different origins the Uqbah Bin Amir Alkinani who are from Mecca and the Al Bakri who are a more recent addition from Oman. The former are mentioned in the Mogadishu founding story as being part of the 39 original families to settle in Mogadishu which 6 were said to Uqbah. Where as the more recent Al-Bakri clan, are said to descend from Khalfan(Shandi) Mohamed Saif Hadi Al-Bakry( Bakar Bin Wail ) who is said to have moved to Marka some 12 generations ago or around 400 years ago according to oral tradition. This is the family the most famous from amongst the Duruqbo comes from Sheikh 'Ali Maye(Mohamed) Haji 'Ali Bin Ahmed Bin Siddiq Albakry.

== Notable people ==
- Shaykh Ali Mohamed(Maye), a revered Sufi saint of the Albakry clan of Duruqbo federation. A yearly festival is held for him outside his shrine in Marka and it ends on the 5 of the Islamic month of Safar
- Ramla Ali, current African Featherweight Champion and the first boxer in history to have won a boxing title whilst representing Somalia.
