= Fasahaale =

Fasahaale فصحالي
Regions with significant populations
- Lower Shabelle

Languages
- Aff Mahdoonte, Benadiri Somali, Somali and Arabic

Religion
- Islam

Related ethnic groups
- Reer faqi, Biido, Asharaf, Bravanese people, and other Benadiri people

Fasahale (Somali: Fasahaale Arabic:فصحالي) more commonly known as Kafaari are a Benadiri/12 Koofi clan mainly from the southern coastal city of Marka.

== Overview ==
The Kafaari have specialised in the manufacture of iron and have their huts-workshops to the east of the city, near the fish market. The young people of the clan prefer to become drivers or mechanics, only a few elderly people continue the art of blacksmiths. According to Pantano (1910: 15) The Kafaari are a fraction of the Sa'ad (Biimaal) and have been in Marka for 250 years
