= Gaameedle =

Gameedle جامد
Regions with significant populations
- Benadir and Lower Shabelle

Languages
- Aff Mahdoonte, Benadiri Somali, Somali and Arabic

Religion
- Islam

Related ethnic groups
- Reer faqi, Biido, Asharaf, Bravanese people, and other Benadiri people

Gaameedle (Somali: Gaameedle Arabic: جامدل) are a Somali clan mainly from the southern coastal cities of Merca and Mogadishu. The Gaameedle is a subclan of the Gendershe clan within the Sheekhaal.

== Overview ==
The Gaameedle clan are said to be Hadarmi ancestry according to their elders and are said to be Ba Hamdani in origin. Prior to colonisation the Gaameedle were known to have ruled Merca and were allied with the Ajuuran clan who had ruled the Merca hinterlands for two centuries before the Biimaal took over the area outside the city. Near their mosque, in the heart of the ancient city, there is the ruin of a palace that is said to have been the seat of Wakil Samo Nayb, the last governor of Ajuran empire theocracy.

== Clan tree ==
A summarised clan tree of the Gameedle is shown below:

- Gaameedle
  - Haji Warrow
    - Reer Samow
    - Reer Qaadirow
  - Haji Abaas
  - Haji Amin
  - Osmankeey
  - Qadhiib

== Distribution ==
The Gaameedle are primarily based in Marka, however can be found in other coastal settlements in such as Mogadishu, Gendershe and villages in the hinterlands. The Haji Warrow, Haji Abaas and Reer Qadhiib are primarily based in Marka, whilst the Osmankeey are primarily based in Shingani. Whereas, Haji Amin are primarily based in Gendershe and Jilib Marka, where they make up one of the seven sub-clans of the Gendershe. The Gaameedle also live in hinterlands in other urban centres such as Baidoa, Afgooye, Janale, Qoryoley, and Buulo Mareer, and small villages such as Idimow, Jamame, and Jeerow.
