= Reer Faqi =

Somali clan family

Arabic

Regions with significant populations
- Benadir and Lower Shabelle

Languages
- Af-Ashraf, Benadiri Somali, Somali, Arabic and Chimini

Religion
- Islam

Related ethnic groups
- Shanshiyo, Biido, Asharaf, Bravanese, Tunni and other Benadiri people

Reer Faqay (Somali: Reer Faqay, Chimini: Ra Faqi) is a Somali clan and a Benadiri sub clan. It is primarily found in the southern coastal cities of Mogadishu, Marka, Baraawe and Kismayo. They established communities in the hinterlands in towns such as Afgooye, Baidoa, Diinsoor and Bardheere.

== Etymology ==
The name Faqi comes from the Arabic fiqh (Islamic jurisprudence).

== Culture ==
The Reer Faqi lineage in a Banaadiri context are inheritors of the role of Qadis. In Mogadishu the chief and several cities of actual Somalia Qadi was chosen from this clan. This is not the case in other Benadiri settlements.

Due to their role in Banaadiri society, especially in Mogadishu, Merca, Baraawa, Kisimaayo, Luuq and other cities in Somalia, the Reer Faqis must be seen as impartial. As a result, the Reer Faqi clan are not seen as either Reer Shingani or Reer Hamar Weyne (Mogadishu's oldest settlements) like other Banaadiri Mogadishu clans. They are one of the only groups who can be found in both moieties (this also includes the clan confederacy Reer Maanyo). Reer Faqi are also not part of any Sufi brotherhood and do not take part in Mogadishu's annual Banaadiri festival "shirta".

The Reer Faqi are one of the oldest communities and one of the first who arrived in the territory of East Africa and in the actual territory of Somalia. Their ancestors were from Yemen originally. The longest presence of Arab communities is proved by the Mosque of al Jama'a and the one of Fakhrudin in Mogadiscio, Somalia. The Jama'a Mosque was built in 636 AH (1238CE).

== Clan tree ==
A summarized clan family tree of the major Benadiri subclan of Reer Faqi is presented below:

- Reer Faqi
  - Musharaf Haaji
    - Abubakar
      - Uthman
        - Muallim Umar
          - Shqaali (Shaykh Ali)
            - Abakar
            - Ahmed
            - Shaykh
          - Aw Abdalla
          - Muallim Umar
            - Muallim Sadaaq
            - Muallim Mukarram
            - Cabdinuur
    - Aba Haaji
      - Faqi Abubakar
        - Faqi Ahmed
        - Muallim Usman
  - Faqi Elmi
    - Faqi Asharow Faqi Elmi
      - Al Faqi Jamal
      - Shaykh Wali
    - Abubakar Faqi Elmi
      - Sadik
      - Omar
      - Osman
      - Ali
      - Mohamed
    - Faqi Ahmed Faqi Elmi
      - Sheikh Mohamed
        - Nur
        - Abdurrahman
        - Ikar
        - Omar
      - Haji Abdinur
        - Abubakar
        - Mayani
        - Aqil
        - Abatey
      - Alim Faqi
        - Ahmed

Some lineages may have been left out.

== See also ==
- Banaadiri people
- Shanshiyo
- Biido
- Haatim
- Asharaf
- 12 Koofi
- Bravenese people
