= Ba Fadal =

Clan of Somalia

Ba Fadal (Somali: Baa Fadal, Arabic: با فضل) are a Benadiri clan predominantly based in historic Shingani district of Mogadishu. However, there are established settlements on the road to Merca in the village of 'Number 50' (Somali: Lambar Konton)

== Clan Tree ==
The Ba Fadal according Anita Adam's Phd are made of 4 sub clans:

- Abud
- Aw Ali
- Aw Mir
- Reer Aw Ikar

== Notable people ==
Shaykh Ahmed Muhiyyidin, was the teacher of Shaykh Sufi from whom he received his ijazah on the way of the Qadiriyya.
