= Haatim =

Somali clan

Haatim حاتم
Regions with significant populations
- Somalia and Kenya

Languages
- AF Maadoonte Chimini, Benadiri Somali, Somali, Arabic and Swahili

Religion
- Islam

Related ethnic groups
- Biido, Asharaf, Bravanese people, Tunni and other Benadiri people

Hatimy (Chimini: Ra Haatimi, Somali: Haatim, Arabic: حاتم ) are a Somali clan from southern coastal cities of Baraawe, Marka and Mogadishu, they can also be found in the hinterland towns in the inter-riverine are of Somalia and further down the Swahili coast. The Haatim clan are synonymous with the town they first settled in, Baraawe and make up one of the groups part of the "todobo Tol" (roughly translates to 7 clans) also known as Bravanese people.

== Overview ==
The Haatim trace their ancestry to Hatim Ta'iyy, a famous pre Islamic poet who lived in the 6th century, most notably the ancestor of the famous Sufi shaykh Ibn Arabi. The Haatim along the benaadir coast first settled in Baraawe and all Haatim in Somalia trace their ancestry to Mohamed bin Muslim bin Sabit bin Cali bin 'Abdullahi at-Tani, who is said to have arrived in Barrawe in 600 AH. From there different branches of Haatim moved to different cities along the Benaadir and Swahili coast and to the hinterlands. In Marka they are made up of 5 sub clans which are: Reer Ahmed Shariif, the Reer Haaji Hassan, the Reer 'Ismaan Nuuri, the Reer Jeenis, and the Reer Diini. It's said that they moved to the city sometime during the 18th century and are part of the local confederacy called the 12 Koofi. In Mogadishu there is one indigenous sub clan called the Abakaaro from the ancient Shingani quarter, however due to it being the capital many Haatims from Baraawe, Marka and other southern villages had moved their post independence. According to locals on the Swahili coast the Haatimi moved to Pate from Yemen via Brava around the sixteenth century to teach the Quran and religion. In the seventeenth and eighteenth centuries, the Hatimi settled the towns of the central (Mrima) coast, where they took the name Shonvi or Jomvu.

== See also ==
- Biido
- Asharaf
- Bravenese People
- Benadiri
- Tunni
