= Bravanese =

Bravanese may refer to:

- Bravanese people
- Bravanese dialect
