= Hamza Mohammed (disambiguation) =

Hamza Mohammed may refer to:

- Hamza Mohammed, Ghanaian footballer
- Hamza Mohamed, Maldivian footballer
- Hamza Mohamed Buri, Somali-Canadian politician
