= Bandhabow =

The Bandhabow are a confederacy of eight benadiri tribes that reside in Xamarweyne, Mogadishu, Somalia, and are one of the first groups to migrate to Xamarweyne. They are famous for making clothing called Alindi and are craftsmen, small traders, sailors and fishermen. This confederacy is mixed with gibil cad (Light skinned) and gibil madow (Dark skinned) tribes and no tribe is known for being strictly one or the other.

Clan tree

- Amin Khalaafow, origins traced to Silcis
- Bahar Suufi, origins traced to Yemen
- Oontiro, origins traced to Ogaden (clan)
- Sheybo, origins traced to Ajuran (clan)
- Quruwaaye, origins traced to Badi Ade
- Reer Ahmed Nuur, origins traced to Sheekhaal Reer Aw Hassan
- Ali iyo Mohamed, origins traced to Hawadle (Ali) and Dhulbahante (Mohamed)
- Gudmane, origins traced to Yemen

== See also ==
- Benadiri people
- 12 Koofi
