= Qalmashube =

Somali clan

Qalmashube قالمشوى
- Banadiri Somali Clan
- Ethnicity: Somali
- Location: Somalia; Yemen
- Descended from: Banadiri some are Hiraab
- Branches: Haji Ibrahim (Owbakar gabane Abgaal); Haji Cabdi; Baaqashaw
- Language: Somali
- Religion: Sunni Islam

Qalmashube or Qalinshube (Chimini: Qalmashube, Somali: Qalmashube, Arabic: قالمشو ) are a Somali clan from southern coastal cities of Baraawe, Marka, Kismayo and Mogadishu, they can also be found in the hinterland towns in the inter-riverine are of Somalia and further down the banadir coast. The Qalmashube clan are synonymous with the town they first settled in, Mogadishu, and make up one of the groups part of the "sedexda Qalmashube" (roughly translating to "3 clans") The clan is historically renowned for traditional craftsmanship, particularly gold and silver smithing.
