= Abdullahi Ali Ahmed Waafow =

Somali general and politician (died 2022)

General Abdullahi Ali Ahmed Waafow MP
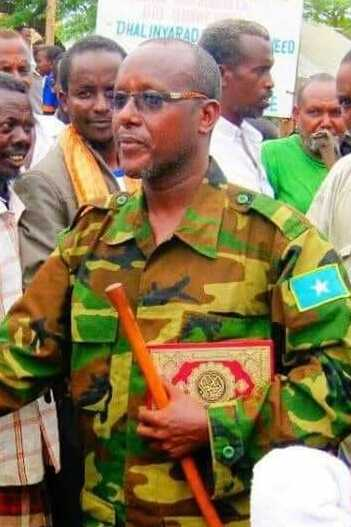
- Offices held: Mayor of Merca; Member of Parliament

Personal details
- Died: 27 July 2022 Merca, Somalia

Abdullahi Ali Ahmed Waafow (died 27 July 2022) was a Somali general and politician who served in the 8th Transitional Federal Parliament of Somalia in the 2000s. A member of the Bimaal clan, Waafow later became the mayor (district commissioner) of the southern city of Merca in the Lower Shabelle region, a position he would hold until his assassination.

On 27 July 2022, Waafow was killed when an al-Shabaab suicide bomber ran up to him and detonated while Waafow was giving a speech outside an administrative office in Merca. Around twenty other people were also killed, mainly Waafow's advisors and security personnel. Waafow was targeted by al-Shabaab due to his support for AMISOM peacekeepers in Lower Shabelle.
