= Sharif Aydarus =

Scholar of Islamic and Somali history and pan-Islamic leader

Sharif Aydarus Sharif Ali al-Nudari
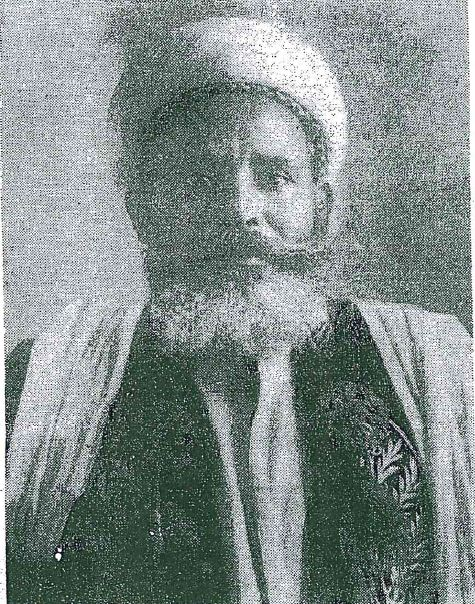
- Born: c. 1893; Mogadishu, Somalia
- Died: 1960; Mogadishu
- Occupations: Islamic Cleric, historian and teacher
- Title: Sheikh and Sharif

Sharif Aydarus Sharif Ali al-Nudari or short Sharif Aydarus (c. 1893–1960) was a scholar of Islamic and Somali history and a pan-Islamic leader.

== History ==
He was born in the city of Mogadishu in the Hijri year 1311 AH (c. 1893–1894 CE) and belonged to the coastal Reer Hamar confederation and the Asharaf clan from the Shingani district.

He studied the Qur'an in the coastal cities of Mombasa and Lamu. In 1914, he came back to Mogadishu in order to teach and to preach at the Shingani Mosque.

He collected oral traditions and used them while teaching Somali history to his students. Eventually all his work and manuscripts were assembled and published in the year 1955 in Arabic by the Trusteeship Administration as Bugyat al-āmāl fī tārīkh al-Ṣūmāl ('The Attainment of Hopes regarding the History of Somalia').

Sharif Aydarus founded the pan-Islamic Somali party called al-Raabitah al-Islamiyyah. He was active in the proselytization of Islam, collaborating with various leaders of tariqas (religious Sufi orders) towards this end. He also served as head of the Mogadishu branch of the pan-Islamic party called al-Mu’tamar al-Islami ('Organization of Islamic Conference') until he died in 1960.
