= Dinsoor District =

Dinsoor
- District
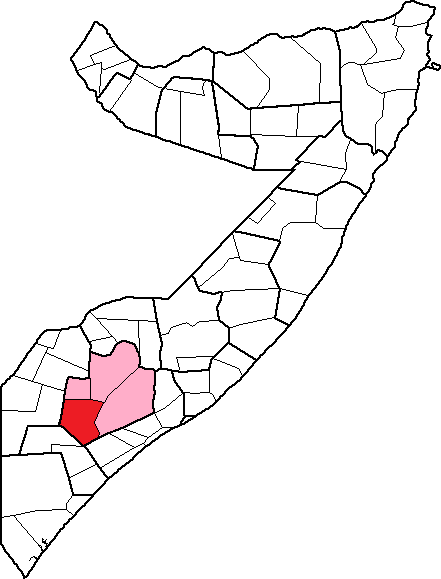
- Country: Somalia
- Region: DooyShabeelle
- Capital: Dinsoor
- Time zone: UTC+3 (EAT)

Dinsoor District (Somali: Degmada Diinsoor) is a district in the southern Dooy Shabeelle State region of Somalia. Its capital is Dinsoor.
