= Abdallah al-Qutbi =

20th-century Islamic scholar and philosopher

Abdallah Yusuf al-Qutbi
- Title: al-Qutbi

Personal life
- Born: 1879
- Died: 1919 .
- Era: 19th–20th century
- Region: Horn of Africa/North Africa
- Main interest(s): Islamic philosophy, polemics

Religious life
- Religion: Islam

Abdallah ibn Mu'allim Yusuf al-Qutbi (Arabic: عبد الله يوسف قطبي) (c. 1879 – 1919 ) was a Somali polemicist, theologian and philosopher who lived in Qulunqul (Kolonkol), Somalia.

== Biography ==
Sheikh Al-Qutbi is best known for his Al-Majmu'at al-mubaraka ("The Blessed Collection"), a five-part compilation of polemics that was published in Cairo ca. 1919–1920 (1338). Sheikh Abdullahi Qutbi, a disciple of Sheikh Abdulrahman Al Shashi and member of Qadiriyyah congregation, an Islamic school of thought or tariqah.

== See also ==
- Shaykh Sufi
