= Paolo Branduani =

Italian footballer

Personal information
- Date of birth: 9 March 1989 (age 37)
- Place of birth: Vizzolo Predabissi, Italy
- Height: 1.92 m (6 ft 4 in)
- Position: Goalkeeper

Team information
- Current team: Paternò
- Number: 22

Youth career
- –2008: Inter Milan
- 2006–2007: → Pro Sesto (loan)

Senior career*
Years	Team	Apps	(Gls)
2008–2009	Colognese	33	(0)
2009–2010	AlbinoLeffe	4	(0)
2010–2012	Feralpisalò	60	(0)
2012–2013	AlbinoLeffe	0	(0)
2013–2015	Feralpisalò	8	(0)
2015–2017	SPAL	36	(0)
2017	Teramo	1	(0)
2017–2020	Juve Stabia	76	(0)
2020	Empoli	0	(0)
2020–2022	Catanzaro	47	(0)
2022–2024	Crotone	19	(0)
2024	Virtus Francavilla	17	(0)
2024–2025	San Marino	21	(0)
2025–2026	Paternò	0	(0)
- * Club domestic league appearances and goals as of 22 February 2026

Paolo Branduani (born 9 March 1989) is an Italian footballer who plays as a goalkeeper for Serie D club Paternò.

== Career ==
A youth product of Inter Milan, he had played for Inter's Giovanissimi Regionali B Team (2001–02 season) to "Primavera" reserve team in 2007–08 season. He was the 4th keeper of the reserve, behind Enrico Alfonso (left the club in January 2008), Vid Belec and Paolo Tornaghi that season.

In 2008–09 season, he left for Serie D club Colognese. In July 2009, he was signed by Serie B club AlbinoLeffe. At first he had to compete with Stefano Layeni and Daniel Offredi for the starting place, until Ivan Pelizzoli recovered from injury and became the first choice, while Layeni became the second keeper.

In July 2010, he left for Feralpisalò in temporary deal along with Andrea Pianetti. The club purchased half of the registration rights of Branduani in summer 2011. Follow the relegation of AlbinoLeffe, the club bought back Branduani.

On 3 January 2013 he started to train with Feralpisalò. On 8 January 2013 Stefano Chimini returned to AlbinoLeffe and left for Fersina Perginese, while Branduani moved to Feralpisalò in 1 1/2-year contract.

On 23 January 2017 he signed for Teramo. On 30 March 2017 he left the club.

On 22 January 2020, he moved to Empoli.

On 31 August 2020 he became a new Catanzaro player.

On 24 June 2022, Branduani signed with Crotone for two years with an option for a third year.

== Honours ==
SPAL

- Lega Pro: 2015–16 (Group B)
- Supercoppa di Serie C: 2016

Juve Stabia

- Serie C: 2018–19 (Group C)
