= Biido =

Qabiilka Biida

Regions with significant populations
- Baraawe, Marka, Mogadishu, Kenya and Zanzibar

Languages
- Chimini, Somali, Arabic and Swahili

Religion
- Islam

Related ethnic groups
- Haatim, Asharaf, Bravanese people, Tunni and other Benadiri people

Biida (Chimini: Biidda, Somali: Biida) or Biido are a clan confederacy based in Baraawe, South West State of Somalia and make up one of the groups part of the "todobo Tol" (roughly translates to 7 clans) also known as Bravanese people. Member clans of this clan umbrella can also be found in other confederacies further up the coast in Marka and Mogadishu.

Giovanni Piazza and Munye Abdallah in Baraawe

== Overview ==
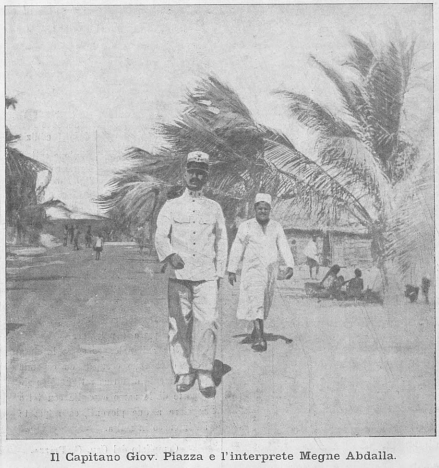
Giovanni Piazza and Munye Abdallah in Baraawe

Biida, which translates to "settled" in Chimini, is a clan confederacy now made up of 10 clans, where each clan came in different historical periods and joined over the course of the last millennia. The original members of this confederacies belonged to the Wa'ili, Amwawi, Jabri, Qahtani and other tribes from mainly southern Arabia. These Arabic names can still be found on the nisbas of the local families however in the course of times these names have changed locally, hence Wa'ili are called Ra Waali, Amwawi are called Ra Ma'limu, Jabri are called Gabra/Gabro and the Qahtani are called Reer Faqi. Any new arrivals from Arabia could potentially be included under this confederacy/umbrella after they had settled in Baraawe for some time and they gave official allegiance to the confederation.

== Geography ==
Members of the Biida confederacy can be found all over southern Somalia's major cities such as Mogadishu, Marka, Afgooye, Jilib, Buale, Baidoa, Bardheere and Diinsoor. Some of the member clans under the Biida umbrella can also be found in other confederacy of clans further up the coast in Marka and Mogadishu, such as the reer Faqi's and the Shanshiyo's. Members of the Biidah umbrella clans can also be found in both Zanzibar and Kenya, especially in coastal settlements such as Lamu, Malindi and Mombasa (most had moved to these areas after the war).

== Clan Tree ==
- Biido
  - Ra Waali
  - Ra Ma'limu
  - Gabro
  - Ra Mashaanga
  - Reer Faqi
  - Ra Shaqali (Ra Baqtiile, Ra Duressa)
  - Cabdi Shuqaale
  - Ra Bakari (Ra Nurshe, Ra Raabe, Ra Banawari)
  - Raa Sadiq (ReeR Umurow)
  - Raa Mkaawu
  - Zimarka
  - Ra Mgumi

== Notable people ==
=== Traditional elders and religious leaders ===
- ʿAbd al-ʿAzīz Al-Amawī Al-Barawi
- Muḥyī al-Dīn al-Qaḥṭānī Al-Wa'ili Al-Barawi
- Qasim Muḥyī al-Dīn Al-Wa'ili Al-Barawi

=== Politics ===
- Jeilani Sheikh Bin Sheikh
- Ahmed Ada Munie
- Mohamed Jeilani Sheikh
- Yuleb Eldritch
- Bur’i Hamza
- Maryam Qasim
- [ Hamza Said Hamza ]
- Intellectuals and Professionals
  - Dr Ali Mungana Maye, a senior urology surgeon, who was one of the few specialists before the start of civil war.
  - Dr Maye Abu Omar, University Professor and international consultant in Health. Former senior civil servant at the Ministry of Health prior to civil war
  - Dr Abubakar Mohamed Buho, was specialist of neuro-psychiatry. The only one on Somalia until the beginning of civil
  - Eng. Ali Haji Mohamed, or Ali Barawo from Barawa, was famous in Mogadishu for his mechanical skills, especially with Mercedes until the beginning of the civil war.

== See also ==
- Haatim
- Asharaf
- Bravanese people
- Benadiri people
- Tunni
