= Uways al-Barawi =

19th and 20th-century Somali Islamic scholar and poet

Uways Al-Barawi أُوَيس البَراوي
- Title: Al Barawi

Personal life
- Born: 1846 Barawa, Geledi Sultanate
- Died: 1909 (aged 62–63) Biyoole, Italian Somaliland
- Era: 19th century
- Region: East Africa
- Main interest(s): Islamic philosophy, Islamic literature

Religious life
- Religion: Islam
- Jurisprudence: Shafi
- Creed: Qadiriyya, Uwaysiyya

Muslim leader
- Influenced by: Abdul Qadir Gilani, Abadir Umar ar-Rida, Al-Zayla'i, Sheikh al-Shashi

Sheikh Uways Al-Barawi (Arabic: أُوَيس البَراوي; 1847–1909) was a Somali scholar credited with reviving Islam in 19th century East Africa.

== Biography ==
=== Early life ===
Sheikh Uways was born in Barawa during the Geledi Sultanate period on the Benadir of Somalia coast, the son of a local religious teacher, al-Hajj Muhammad b. Bashiir, and Fatima b. Bahra. He was of the Tunni sub-group of the Rahanweyn. He obtained a simple elementary education in basic theological sciences, and only later furthered his studies with eminent scholars. Sheikh Uways studied the Qur'an, Qur'anic exegesis, syntax and grammar, legal principles and basic Sufism under the tutelage of one Sheikh al-Shashi in his local vicinity.

=== Studies in Iraq ===
Due to his devotion to the Islam faith, Sheikh Uways caught the attention of his teacher who then introduced him to the Qadiriyya doctrines and, circa 1870, took him to the birthplace of that tariqah in Baghdad. This journey had was an important factor on Sheikh Uways' spiritual search and religious credibility. He studied with the well-known Qadiri, Sayyid Mustafa b. Salman al-Jilani and later claimed to have received an ijazah from his teacher, thus boosting his reputation. Uways also made Hajj to Madinah and Makkah during this time, which normally marks a spiritual milestone for Muslims.

=== Return and Teachings ===
In 1883, Sheikh Uways made his way back to his hometown to settle there for good. A very important journey in enhancing his reputation as a scholar was when he passed through the Hejaz, Yemen and Somaliland. While in Somaliland in particular, Choi Ahmed claimed through oral tradition that Shaykh Uways met the renowned Somali Qadiri Shaykh Abd al Rahman al-Zayla'i near Qolonqol right before his death and was at that time granted complete control of the Qadiriyya in Somaliland. On the other hand, the Somali scholar Said Sheikh Samatar claims that Shaykh Uways merely visited al-Zayla'i's tomb and received a symbolic ijazah to preach. Whether or not the former or the latter claims are correct, both Choi Ahmed and Samatar imply that Shaykh Uways successfully established himself as the successor to the much revered Shaykh Abd Al-Rahman bin Ahmad al-Zayla'i.

Sheikh Uways' reputation and renown preceded him by the time of his arrival back in his hometown of Barawa. He was subsequently elevated as leader of the Qadiriyya in Somalia (which later became a sub-branch named after him, the Uwaysiyya), and began missionary works throughout East Africa. According to B.G. Martin, this newly earned prominence was met with envy by the rival brotherhoods of Ahmadiya and Saalihiya, and even by some family members, according to Samatar. This intense competition for influence led Sheikh Uways to seek greener pastures, perhaps in emulation of Muhammad's hijra from Makkah to Madinah.

==== Reception in Mogadishu ====
Following Uways return he would visit Mogadishu and this famous story of his meeting with the Abgal Imam Mahmud and Asharaf leaders in the city recorded by Scott Reese.

When Shaykh Uways al-Qadiri came from Bagdhad he stayed in the house of Imam Mahmud Binyamin Al-Ya'qubi, who received him and honoured him, he was initiated into the Qadiriyya [by Shaykh Uways]. There was in that time in Mogadishu a heinous practice called hiku that was practiced by two groups; one was called the 'almugh and the other the shabili. Each was a powerful party being composed of people from Hamarweyn and Shangani [the two principal quarters of the town]. The members of each faction aided each other with their assets. Among them were the Asharaaf, merchants, notables, clan elders, rulers, patrons and people of the ships. All of them assisted and participated in this abominable practice until the hearts of the ulama contracted [with anguish] but they were incapable of stopping the custom ...[However], when [the participants in this practice] heard of his arrival in Mogadishu and his presence in the house of the Imam they took counsel in their meeting place and said: Tomorrow, God willing, we will meet in the Friday mosque in Shangani and face Shaykh Uways al-Qadiri so that we may repent before him this abomination. They met in front of the mosque, performed ritual ablutions and went before Shaykh Uways. They greeted each other, and their leaders said, 'O Sheikh Uways al-Qadiri, we repentof this abomination and fraud and abandon it. May God grant us victory and guidance...' And...they abandoned this repulsive practice and other abominations with his blessing.

=== Struggle Against Salihiyya and Death ===
This decision made room for further proselytizing, which in turn increased his influence. Sheikh Uways moved inland and founded Beled al-Amin (translated as "Town of Peace"), which flourished into an agricultural town. Bearing testament to his mass appeal, Samatar mentions that "nomad and farmer flocked to his community, bringing with them gifts in vast amounts of livestock and farm produce". Freed from external pressure from the Salihiyya of Sayyid Mohammed Abdullah Hassan in northern Somalia, the Sahiliyya led by Sayyid Muhammad Maaruf from the Comoros Islands, and Christian missionaries from inland Ethiopia, Uways and his followers were able to focus on proselytizing the Qadariyya. The struggle of Shaykh Uways against the Salihiyya was so intense that he was resolute to being a martyr (martin). Moving north to curb the influence of radical nationalist and puritanical teachings of Salihiya neo-Sufis, Heated poems would be exchanged between the Sayyid and Sheikh Uways.

Uways recited this poem criticizing the Sayyid

صل على محمد واله واصرف بهم من كل سوء داهيه
من اقتدى محمدا بشرعه لا يقتدى جماعة الشيطانية
هم المبيحون دماء العلما والمال والحريم هم إباحيه
ويمنعون الدرس للعلوم كالفقه والنحو هم الكراميه
بكل شيخ مات كالجيلاني لا يتوسلون كالجناحيه
لا يقتدرون خلف من له شعر سيماهم التحليق كالوهابيه
ويشترون الجنة بمال في دارنا جهرا هم الكلابيه
ويختلون بالحريم للإجا زة كأمهم فذا سفاحيه
يتبعون رأيهم لا كتبنا ويدعون النور من بلاسيه
ويفعلون النكر في ذكرهم فعلا وقولا يقتضي كفرانيه
كاللعب قائلين أألله شكا به جلهم الشماليه
لهم ضجيج وأنين وحنيــــــــن وفحيح كالكلاب الناحيه
ويكثرون الحلف بالطلاق وينكرون الكلفة الالهيه
ضلوا وأضلوا العباد في الثرى برا وبحرا اي من السماليه
أليس ذو لب وفهم يغترر بهم ففر عنهم كالدواهيه

— Uways Al Barawi Qasida on Salihiyya
Translation:

Give a prayer to Muhammad (Sayyid) and his family and turn, through them, from all evil calamities
The ones who has imitated Muhammad (Prophet Muhammad) through his law does not follow the faction of Satan
They are the justifiers of [spilling] the blood of the ulama and of wealth and women, they are libertines
They prohibit the study of sciences such as law and grammar, they are the repugnant

Through every Shaykh who has died such as Al-Jilani they do not seek petition, like the faction of sin
They do not follow behind the one who has locks of hair, their characteristic is to wear their hair like the Wahhabiyya
They trade paradise for cash publicly, in our land, they are a sect of dogs
They dally with women who come for license, like with their own mothers, and this is fornication

They follow their own opinions, not our books, and they claim to the light from the faction of Satan
And they practice denial at their dhikr, in word and action it requires blasphemy
Like their game of saying Is it God? - doubting him, the northern faction (dervishes) glorify them
They make a clamour, a wailing and groaning and howling like mournful dogs

And they frequently use the oath By the divorce and reject the ceremony of Allah
They have gone astray and make people go astray on earth by land and sea anyone from [among] the Somalis
Is it not the owner of reason and understanding deceived by them?
Then flee from them as from calamities

With a long response the Sayyid ended with these sharp words

A word from the backsliding apostates (Qadiriyya)
Who have gone astray from the Prophet's way, the straight path
Why is the truth so plain, hidden from you?

This exchange would lead to takfir or accusations of apostasy from both men and the murder of Uways by the Dervish in 1909. This ironically proved Sheikh Uways' accusation that the Sayyid deemed it lawful to spill the blood of the learned. The Sayyid would mock Sheikh Uways death with a final poem Behold, at last, when we slew the old wizard, the rains began to come!".

The tragic ending of the Uwaysiyya leader was compounded with the death of all but one of his disciples, a person who later carried on the Uwaysiyya legacy. This remaining disciple composed a moving qasida that eventually became a liturgy of the Uwaysiyya order. Uways's house was later bought by Shaykh Sufi and turned into the main headquarters of the Uwaysiyya.

== Poetry ==
Sheikh Uways composed numerous religious poems and they were included in the Majumuʿa Qasaʿid fi Madh Sayyid Al-Anbiya (A Collection of Qasidas in praise of the Master of Prophets). Uways' teacher Shaykh Sufi and Al-Zayla'i's poems also feature in the text.

This Qasida entitled Hadiyat al-ʿAnam ila Qabr al-Nabi (Guidance of Humanity to the tomb of the Prophet) extols the Prophet Muhammad. Uways' brother and student Muhammad Al Barawi would accompany him to Makkah and recited the poem to Sayyid Abu Bakr who was an Imam of Masjid Al Haram and many other notables. After the recitation they applauded them and marveled at Uways and Muhammad.

إذا ماشئت تيسير المراد فصل على رسولك خير هادى
وقل مستنجدا في كل ناد صلاة الله مانادى المنادى
على المختار مولانا الحماد
حبيب الله افضل من ترقى وقبره فاق كرسيا ومرقى
وكل مواضع الخيرات صدقا يفوح المسك والريحان حقا
لقبر محمد نور الفؤاد
تنور جميع ارجاء الحبيب - يرى الانوار قاصده بطيب
ويلقاه البعيد مع القريب - يعم الال جيران الحبيب
بعرف عبيره اهل البلاد

— Uways Al Barawi Hadiyat al-ʿAnam ila Qabr al-Nabi
Translation:

Whenever you wish to make easy your objective then give a prayer to your messenger the best of Guides
And say, seeking aid in every circle blessings of Allah, as the crier cries on the Chosen, our master the praised

Beloved of Allah preferred of those who ascended, his tomb is above any throne or high place
As in every pious place, sincerely musk and spices give fragrances, truly to the tomb of Muhammad light of the heart

Every aspect of the Habib gives light the one who seeks him, sees the lights with goodness
The distances meets it along with the near it will encompass the family, the neighbors of the beloved
As well as the people of the community, with knowledge of his fragrance

== Influence ==
Though various Somali wadaads and scholars had used the Arabic script to write in Somali for centuries, it would not be until the 19th century when Sheikh Uways would improve the wadaad's script. He applied it to the Maay dialect of southern Somalia, which at the time was the closest to standardizing Somali with the Arabic script. Al-Barawi modeled his alphabet after the Arabic transcription adopted by the Amrani of Barawa (Brava) to write their Swahili dialect, Bravanese.

Sheikh Uways' influence can be felt throughout East Africa: From the islands surrounding Zanzibar to as far west as the Eastern Congo and as far south as the Tanganyika. His influence in Zanzibar alone was attributed to his close relationship with the Sultanate, two of whom he took as his Khalifah. This close relationship was established as a result of the Sultan of Zanzibar encouragement. Uways' widespread appeal is also attributed to the present circumstances of the Benadir coast, where foreign migration undermined local economic domination. The locals thought their calamity correlated with their lack of spiritual strength rather than external circumstances. Sufi orders then "provided a context for exploring these failings and proposing solutions by means of a renewed moral framework" (Reese). This phenomenon elevates the status of wadaads, where merchants subsidized activities of the wadaads. Due to the Qadiriyya's popularity (which Uways spearheaded), the Sheikh's elevated status was most felt.

== See also ==
- Abd Al-Rahman bin Ahmad al-Zayla'i an influential Qadiriya member and influence of nearly all subsequent Somali sufis
- Shaykh Sufi the teacher of Uways al Barawi
- Mohammed Abdullah Hassan rival of Sheikh Uways and his Dervish adherents would kill Uways
- Sheikh Madar Somali leader of the Qadiriyya tariqa and enemy of Mohammed Abdullah Hassan
