= Merca District =

Merca
- District
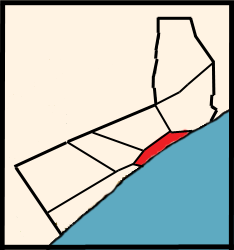
- Country: Somalia
- Region: Lower Shebelle
- Capital: Merca
- Time zone: UTC+3 (EAT)

Merca District (Somali: Degmada Merka) is a district of the southeastern Lower Shebelle (Shabeellaha Hoose) region in Somalia. Its capital lies at Merca.
