= Abd al-Rahman al-Zayla'i =

19th-century Somali Islamic jurist

ʽAbd al-Raḥman bin Aḥmad al-Zaylaʽi عبد الرحمن بن أحمد الزيلعي
- Title: Shaykh

Personal life
- Born: 1820
- Died: 1882 (aged 61–62)
- Era: 19th century
- Region: Zeila
- Main interest(s): Islamic philosophy, Fiqh

Religious life
- Religion: Islam

Muslim leader
- Influenced by: Abdul Qadir Gilani, Abadir Umar ar-Rida,
- Influenced: Uways al-Barawi, Shaykh Sufi

Al-Zaylaʽi (ʽAbd al-Raḥman bin Aḥmad al-Zaylaʽi عبد الرحمن بن أحمد الزيلعي) (1820–1882) was a Somali scholar who played a crucial role in the spread of the Qadiriyyah Sufi order in Somalia and East Africa.

Born in the rural village of Kodle in the Bakool region northwest of Mogadishu, he studied elementary Ilm under the supervision of the local Ulema. He later moved to Mogadishu, studying under Sheikh Isma'il b. Umar al-Maqdishi.

Al-Zayla'i traveled to various Islamic centers in the Horn of Africa. Upon returning to his home village, he established a community of pupils near Qolonqol, setting out to spread the Qadiriyyah order throughout the upper Shebelle region. This enhanced his reputation and also helped the order gain considerable success amongst the region's pastoralists, the religious elite, and the villagers of the interior.

== See also ==
- Uways al-Barawi
- Zeila
