= Aw Garweyne =

- Island
- Country: Somalia
- Region: Lower Shabelle
- Time zone: UTC+3 (EAT)

Aw Garweyne is an island of ancient habitation in the southeastern Lower Shabelle province of Somalia.

== Overview ==
Aw Garweyne was originally positioned off of the Benadir littoral. It is now joined to the mainland by sand.

The small island is an important local archaeological site, featuring a number of old ruins. Among these structures is the tomb of the eponymous Aw Garweyne ("large bearded cleric"), the sobriquet of Sheikh 'Ismaan. Geledi and Wa'dhaan tradition on the southern mainland upholds the memory of the late Islamic saint and his long grizzled beard.

== See also ==
- Toniki
