= Islands of Africa =

The islands of Africa are a major geographical sub-region of Africa, and represent a distinct demographic and historical cultural sphere of influence on the continent.

== Introduction ==
The islands of Africa can be subdivided into Indian Ocean Islands and Atlantic Ocean Islands. The largest number of islands of Africa are found in the Indian Ocean, with the sovereign island nations of Comoros, Seychelles, Mauritius and Madagascar located off the southeastern seaboard of Africa being the most notable. The French overseas territories of Mayotte and Réunion are also located nearby. The medium-sized islands of Zanzibar and Lamu of Tanzania and Kenya, respectively, are also located in the Indian Ocean, in addition to smaller islands off the coasts of other continental countries. In the Atlantic seaboard, the largest islands are Cape Verde off the coast of West Africa and Sao Tome and Principe off the southwestern seaboard. In the Atlantic Ocean, the island of Bioko and other smaller islands of Equatorial Guinea are also notable. The Canary Islands and other territories of Spain are present in the Mediterranean Sea in the north Atlantic Ocean, and the British Overseas Territories of Saint Helena, Ascension Island, and Tristan da Cunha are located off the southwestern seaboard of the continent.

== Geology ==
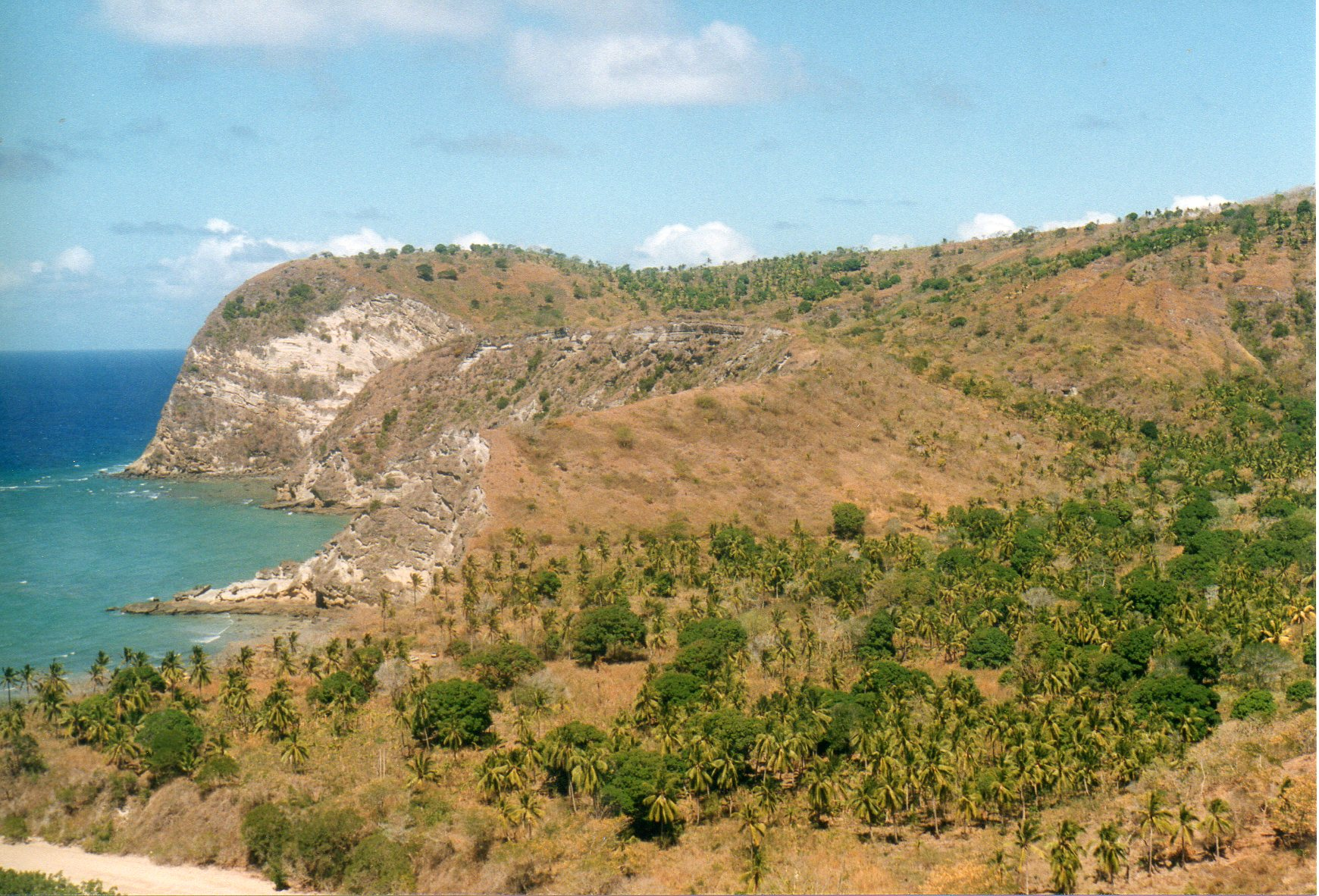
Hauteurs de Moya in Mayotte

All of the islands of Africa, except for Madagascar, are classified as small islands under the UNESCO classification system for all islands under 2,000 square kilometres (770 sq mi). Madagascar, in contrast, at 587,041 square kilometres (226,658 sq mi) is the fourth-largest island in the world. In line with most characteristics of small islands, the islands of Africa with the exception of Madagascar are almost all volcanic in origin, high in structure, with low coral elevation, with some surface water resources and undergo variable weather conditions, with occasional destructive tropical cyclones.

== Geography and history ==
=== Sovereign island nations ===
==== Indian Ocean islands ====
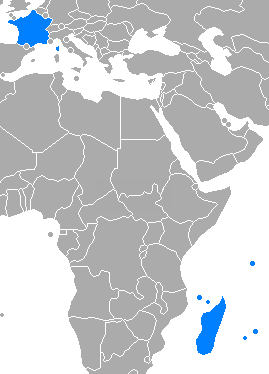
Map of Indian Ocean Commission members

There are four sovereign African island nations located in the Indian Ocean: Comoros, Madagascar, Mauritius and Seychelles. These countries have interrelated histories and populations over hundreds of years of interaction. These islands, in addition to the French territories of Réunion and Mayotte make up the membership of the Indian Ocean Commission.

Each of the sovereign Indian Ocean nations have complex population histories with Southeast Asian exploration and settlement, Arab trade and the Bantu migrations each playing a crucial role before later European colonization.

The Malagasy settled the largest island of the Indian Ocean (and the fourth-largest globally), Madagascar, along with a group of smaller islands nearby, namely Réunion and the Comoros. Madagascar became part of the French colonial empire following two military campaigns against the Kingdom of Madagascar, which it initiated after persuading Britain to relinquish its interests in the island in exchange for control of Zanzibar off the coast of Tanganyika, an important island hub of the spices trade. The British also held a number of island colonies in the region, including the extended archipelago of Seychelles and the rich farming island of Mauritius, previously under the French sovereignty.

==== Atlantic Ocean islands ====
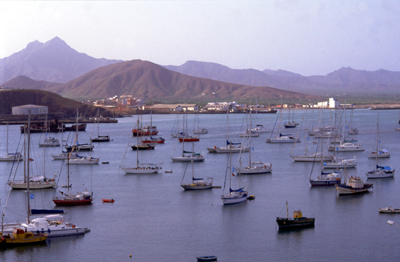
São Vicente in Cape Verde

There are two sovereign island nations in the Atlantic Ocean: São Tomé and Príncipe and Cape Verde. Both islands share some historical and demographic features, especially in relation to their uses as transit points during the Atlantic slave trade.

Neither São Tomé and Príncipe nor Cape Verde were inhabited before European colonization in the wake of the Atlantic slave trade.

=== European dependencies and territories ===
Both Spain and France retain possession of a number of territories in Africa in the form of islands in the Mediterranean Sea of the Atlantic Ocean in the case of Spain, and in the Indian Ocean in the case of France. Italy, the United Kingdom and Portugal also retain possession of small islands in the Atlantic Ocean.

The Canary Islands, as well as Ceuta and Melilla and the Plazas de soberania islands in the Mediterranean Sea off the northern coast of Morocco, have long been in Spanish possession since the Reconquista, although Morocco continues to challenge Spain's authority over some of the islands.

The French Îles Éparses

Following the independence of Comoros from France, the island of Mayotte voted in 1975 to remain a French territory, and in 2011 attained the status of a French department, along with Réunion which has held that status since the 1950s. Comoros continues to challenge France's possession of Mayotte, and Comoros, Madagascar, Mauritius and Seychelles also variously dispute France's possession of its Îles Éparses, or other scattered islands of the Indian Ocean.

The United Kingdom also retains territories in the form of Saint Helena, Ascension, and Tristan da Cunha off Africa's western seaboard in the Atlantic Ocean, as does Portugal with the islands of Madeira north of the Canary Islands and Italy with the islands of Lampedusa and Lampione off the northern coast of Tunisia.

=== Other ===
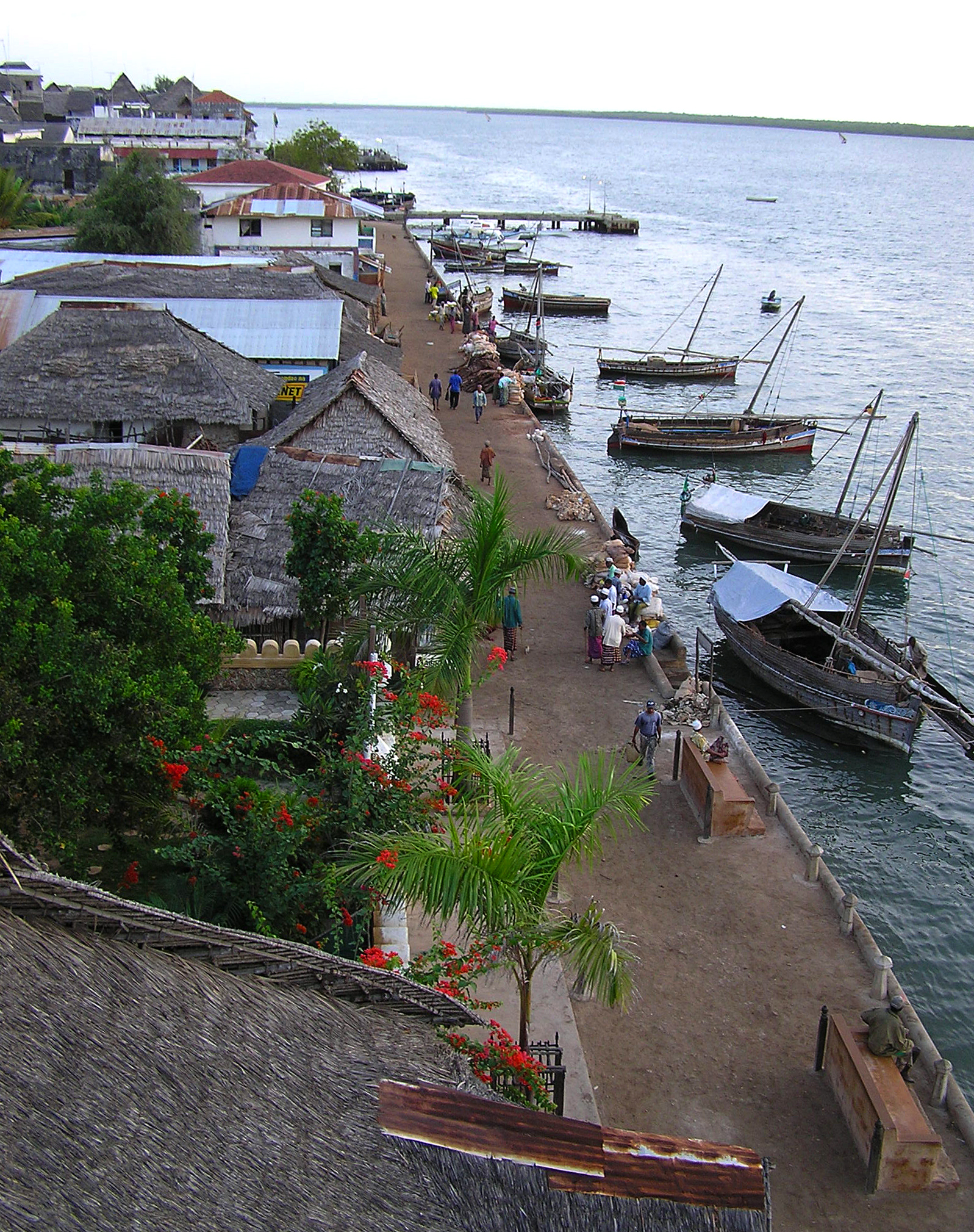
Lamu in Kenya

Many continental African countries also include many islands within their territories. Some of these islands have witnessed rising secessionist movements, most notably the islands of Zanzibar in Tanzania and Lamu in Kenya. Somalia is also home to a large number of islands, including the Bajuuni Islands.

== Demographics ==
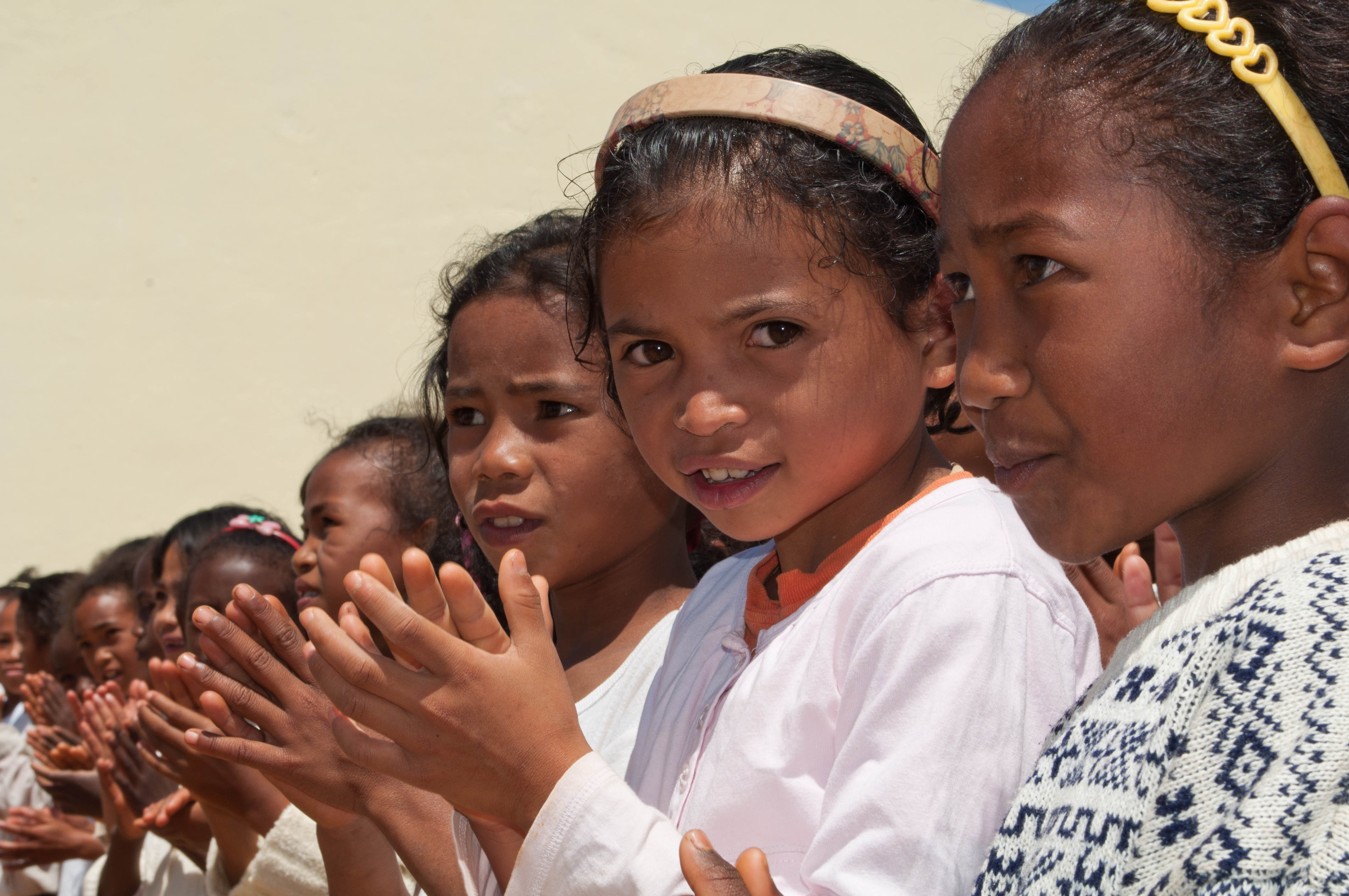
Malagasy schoolgirls

The total population of inhabitants of the islands of Africa is estimated at a little over 30 million, with the bulk of the population of the islands of Africa residing in Madagascar.

== Culture ==
The islands of Africa share many cultural traits due to similar settlement and population histories. Most of the creole languages of Africa developed on the islands of Africa, and the development of the Swahili language and Malagasy language, both of which incorporate various Arabic, Persian, Bantu and Southeast Asian (in the case of Malagasy) elements, took place mostly on the Indian Ocean islands. The musical innovations of many islands of Africa from contact between Asian, European and African instruments and styles are also popular on continental Africa, most notably those of the Music of Cape Verde and Music of Zanzibar.

== See also ==
- List of islands of Africa
