= Dada Masiti =

Swahili poet and scholar (c. 1810s–1919)

Dada Masiti مانا ستي حبيب جمال الدين
- Born: Mana Sitti Habib Jamaladdin c. 1810s Chundwa, Kenya
- Died: 15 July 1919; Barawa, Somalia
- Occupations: Poet, Islamic scholar

Mana Sitti Habib Jamaladdin (Arabic: مانا ستي حبيب جمال الدين) (c. 1810s – 15 July 1919), commonly known as Dada Masiti ("Sister Masiti"), was a Swahili poet, mystic and Islamic scholar from Somalia. She composed her poetry in the Bravanese dialect spoken in Barawa.

== Biography ==
Dada Masiti was born Mana Sitti Habib Jamaladdin in the 1810s in Tunda (Also spelled as Chundwa or Tchundwa), a coastal town in Pate Island, Lamu. Dada Masiti left Tunda for Brava at a very early age and as such is often wrongly presumed to have been born in Brava. Her family on both sides hailed from the Mahadali Ashraf clan. Her mother's maternal grandfather also belonged to the Ali Naziri Ashraf, which commanded more influence in the area and was the larger of the two subclans. The Ashraf had first established residence in Barawa around the start of the 1600s, and ultimately traced their lineage to the Prophet Muhammad. Like the claims of other Somali clans in this regard, this alleged genealogy is historically untenable.

What is known about Dada Masiti's early years is exclusively derived from different oral traditions. Accounts endorsed by descendants of her nearer relatives indicate that she was kidnapped and taken to Zanzibar. While she had been abducted, the kidnapping occurred while she was a teenager and was carried out with her consent by a suitor that her family had turned down as a potential husband. The two eloped and were wed in Pate. Their relationship shortly afterwards fell apart, and she was then reportedly held in a manner approaching slavery for around ten years. She eventually succeeded in escaping, and her maternal cousin Omar Qullatten, who at the time resided in Zanzibar, came to her rescue. Dada Masiti herself appears to confirm this version of events in her poetry since she alludes to having been led astray by worldly lures, and expresses contrition and a desire to atone for her deeds. Her poems also mention Omar Qullatten by name, and repeatedly request that God bless him. Dada Masiti never remarried and bore no children.

Dada Masiti immersed herself in religious studies under a Sheikh Mohammed Janna al-Bahluli. A follower of the Qadiriyya, her poetry demonstrates a detailed understanding of the Quran and Sunnah. Poetry dedicated to her by her contemporaries gives evidence that she was well-respected. Sheikh Qasim Muhyiddin al-Barawi referred to her as a "treasure to be jealously preserved".

Dada Masiti's most famous poem was "After Life, Comes Death: When the Sheikh Dies, No One Should Weep", composed for her friend, the jurist Sheikh Nureni Mohammed Sabir. She also composed "Shaikhi Chifa isiloowa", a eulogy for Sheikh Nurein Ahmed al-Sabir al-Hatimy. Many of her contemporaries committed to memory her poetry, particularly women. Her verse still figures prominently in the poetic annals of Barawa.

After her death, Dada Masiti was buried on the site of her small house in Barawa. An annual ziyārah to her shrine is observed in the town.
