= Abd al Aziz al-Amawi =

19th-century Somali diplomat, poet, and scholar

- Title: al-Amawi

Personal life
- Born: 1832
- Died: 1896 (aged 63–64)
- Era: 19th century
- Region: East Africa
- Main interest(s): poetry, theology, Islamic jurisprudence

Religious life
- Religion: Islam
- Jurisprudence: Shafi`i

‘Abd al-‘Azīz al-Amawī (Arabic: عبد العزيز الأموي; 1838–1896) was a Somali scholar following the Shāfi‘ī school of jurisprudence and the Ash'arite school of theology, and was a Sufi shaykh of the Qādiryya Sufi order, of which he established his own branch. He was also adviser to several sultans of Zanzibar.

== Biography ==
Al-Amawī was born in the city of Barawa to the Ra Ma'limu clan, where he pursued studies under several well-known scholars, such as Sayyid Abū Bakr al-Miḥḍār al-Ḥaḍramī, Ḥājj ‘Alī b. ‘Abd al-Raḥmān, and the North African scholar Sayyid Aḥmad al-Maghribī. Al-Amawī left Barawa for Zanzibar in his teens to study under Muhyi al-Din al-Qahtani, the chief Shāfi‘ī qādī of Zanzibar. Al-Qahtani introduced him to the sultan of Zanzibar, Sayyid Sa'id bin Sultan. In 1854, al-Amawī, who was then only sixteen years old, was appointed by the Sultan as the Qadi (judge) of Kilwa. Al-Amawī was soon transferred to Zanzibar, where he served until 1891, when his son Burhān took the position.

Abdallah Salih Farsy wrote that al-Amawī became a virtual prime minister during the reign of Sayyid Khalīfa (r. 1888–90).

=== Writings ===
Al-Amawī wrote on theology, law, Sufism, grammar, rhetoric, and history, and composed an unfinished Swahili-Arabic dictionary. He also served as a political advisor, ambassador, and diplomat in Somalia, the Comoro islands, the Rovuma River region, and various other places on the African mainland on behalf of two of Zanzibar's sultans, Sayyid Mājid (r. 1856–70) and Sayyid Barghash (r. 1870–88). Although Farsy said all of his writings were missing, since 2000 portions of his writings, all unpublished, were located in Dar Es Salaam (copies of which can be found in the Zanzibar National Archives) and in the library of Sayyid Muhammad Āl Bū Sa‘īdī in Seeb, Oman. They include portions of his diaries from two of his six journeys in the Rovuma region, a history of the Bū Saʻīdī dynasty, Sufi and devotional texts, a work on rhetoric, and a theological poem following the doctrines of the Ash‘arite school of Sunni Islam, ‘Iqd al-la’ālī (Necklace of Pearls), with a lengthy commentary, Taqrīb ‘Iqd al-la’ālī ilā fahm al-atfāli . This poem was written in response to a twelfth-century theological poem, Bad’ al-āmāl, written by Sirāj al-Dīn ‘Alī b.‘Uthmān al-Ūshī al-Farghānī, following the doctrines of the Māturidite school of Sunni Islam.

=== Conflict with Sayyid Barghash ===
Randall Pouwels writes that al-Amawī’s success as a Sufi shaykh led to many conversions from Ibāḍī Islam (to which the ruling class of Zanzibar belonged) to Sunni Islam, making him an embarrassment to Sayyid Barghash, who banned him from attending Friday prayers at the mosque. According to Pouwels, al-Amawī countered by showing up at the mosque armed, with his followers, forcing the sultan to back down—but not without first imprisoning al-Amawī, although al-Amawī’s popularity forced Barghash to keep his incarceration brief. However, whereas Pouwels presents al-Amawī as a thorn in Barghash’s side and a pest to sultans in general, with the exception of Khalīfa, in a fragment of his writing found in Dar Es Salaam, al-Amawī presents himself consistently as a close counselor and confidant of the sultan. Likewise, in the fragments of his accounts of his journeys to the Rovuma River region on behalf of Sayyid Barghash, found in the Bū Sa‘īdī in Oman, he always describes himself as “a servant of our lord the Sayyid,” ever striving on behalf of the interests of the state.

=== Contacts with Christian theologians ===
Although Farsy reports that of all Muslim shaykhs on the coast, al-Amawī was the most skilled at and involved in debating Christian missionaries, it is nonetheless also true that he assisted Bishop Edward Steere, who served in Zanzibar from 1864 until his death in 1882, by helping in the translation of some of the Psalms and the Gospel of Luke into Swahili (Steere 1883; Steere1884: vi–vii; Mojola 2001: 514). Steere also wrote that he held weekly meetings with local Muslim shaykhs in his home, and it is likely that al-Amawī was a participant. In one letter he wrote, “Abdul Aziz called and asked for an explanation of the statement that man was made ‘in the image of God,’ which shocked them. I wrote and sent him an explanation in Swahili.” In one of the Dar es Salaam fragments, al-Amawī mentions a debate moderated by Sir Arthur Hardinge that he had with Bishop Chauncy Maples in the Anglican cathedral in Zanzibar. Al-Amawī says that he had known Maples since the days of Bishop Steere, and proceeds to cite the precise hour of Steere's death—a sign, perhaps, of a close relationship between them.
