= Burhakaba =

Buurhakaba
- Town
- Nickname: Hakaba
- Location Bay region in Somalia.
- Coordinates: 2°47′0″N 44°5′0″E
- Country: Somalia
- Region: Bay
- State: South West

Government
  - Mayor: Mohamed Nur Mohamad (Francisco)
- Elevation: 643 ft (196 m)

Population (2018)estimated
  - Total: 360,795
- Time zone: UTC+3 (EAT)
- Area code: +2526
- Website: buurhakaba.com

Burhakaba (Somali: Buurhakaba) is a town located in the Bay region in Somalia.

The town takes its name from a big mountain in the city's center.

== Overview ==
Burhakaba is the second largest town in the Bay region (gobolka Baay in Somali), with a reported population of 360,795. It is 180 km (110 mi) southwest of the capital Mogadishu and 60 km (37 mi) northeast from the regional center Baidoa. Burhakaba administrative district encompasses nearly 400 villages. The town is estimated to have been settled six centuries ago.Burhakaba is subdivided into several administrative villages: Waaberi, Wadajir and Hoolwadaag.

== Geography and demographics ==
Burhakaba is situated at the coordinates of 2.7991° N, 44.0794° E with an elevation of 196 meters above sea level. It lacks a permanent river, but it does have a large valley known as "Bohol Wiinti" that runs through the town from the north, east, and south-east. After seasonal rainfall, the valley supports farming in the area it drains. The annual rainfall in the town is estimated to be 550 to 620 mm (22 to 24 in). The town is primarily populated by the Eelaay clan, a sub-clan of Rahanweyn. The main language spoken in the town is Maay, the second largest dialect in Somalia.

Burhakaba is thought to hold vast mineral and rock reserves, including uranium (in the Aliyow Geele area), iron, aluminum, phosphorus, kaolin, bauxite, granite, marbles, sandstones, crushed rocks, and limestone, despite the fact that it has yet to be properly explored. Burhakaba has the strategic advantage of connecting the three regions of Bakool, Hiiraan, and Lower Shabelle.

== Climate ==
Buurhakaba has a hot semi-arid climate (Köppen BSh), like most of southern Somalia. The average mean temperature is 26.2 °C or 79.2 °F, but the temperature can reach as high as 43 to 45 °C (109.4 to 113.0 °F) in December and January. By contrast, towns in the northern part of the country generally have a hot arid climate (Köppen BWh).

Climate data for Buurhakaba/Baidoa
Month	Jan	Feb	Mar	Apr	May	Jun	Jul	Aug	Sep	Oct	Nov	Dec	Year
Record high °C (°F)	44.0 (111.2)	43.0 (109.4)	43.0 (109.4)	43.0 (109.4)	40.3 (104.5)	39.5 (103.1)	37.0 (98.6)	38.0 (100.4)	39.0 (102.2)	40.0 (104.0)	44.0 (111.2)	45.0 (113.0)	45.0 (113.0)
Mean daily maximum °C (°F)	34.3 (93.7)	35.7 (96.3)	35.8 (96.4)	34.1 (93.4)	31.5 (88.7)	30.4 (86.7)	28.8 (83.8)	29.3 (84.7)	30.8 (87.4)	30.9 (87.6)	31.5 (88.7)	32.9 (91.2)	32.1 (89.8)
Daily mean °C (°F)	27.2 (81.0)	28.0 (82.4)	28.3 (82.9)	27.5 (81.5)	26.1 (79.0)	25.1 (77.2)	24.0 (75.2)	24.3 (75.7)	25.2 (77.4)	25.5 (77.9)	26.1 (79.0)	26.6 (79.9)	26.2 (79.2)
Mean daily minimum °C (°F)	19.9 (67.8)	20.3 (68.5)	20.9 (69.6)	21.0 (69.8)	20.8 (69.4)	20.0 (68.0)	19.3 (66.7)	19.4 (66.9)	19.7 (67.5)	20.4 (68.7)	20.2 (68.4)	20.2 (68.4)	20.2 (68.4)
Record low °C (°F)	14.3 (57.7)	15.4 (59.7)	16.0 (60.8)	15.0 (59.0)	14.0 (57.2)	17.0 (62.6)	15.0 (59.0)	10.0 (50.0)	15.0 (59.0)	15.0 (59.0)	16.0 (60.8)	15.5 (59.9)	10.0 (50.0)
Average rainfall mm (inches)	1 (0.0)	6 (0.2)	23 (0.9)	151 (5.9)	118 (4.6)	12 (0.5)	19 (0.7)	7 (0.3)	13 (0.5)	141 (5.6)	80 (3.1)	14 (0.6)	585 (22.9)
Average rainy days (≥ 0.1 mm)	0	1	3	11	7	3	4	2	2	10	7	2	52
Average relative humidity (%)	59	58	60	70	75	70	71	67	64	72	74	67	67
Mean monthly sunshine hours	288.3	274.0	275.9	228.0	238.7	207.0	161.2	207.7	219.0	192.2	237.0	275.9	2,804.9
Mean daily sunshine hours	9.3	9.7	8.9	7.6	7.7	6.9	5.2	6.7	7.3	6.2	7.9	8.9	7.7
Percentage possible sunshine	78	81	73	62	63	56	42	55	60	52	66	75	64
Source 1: Deutscher Wetterdienst
Source 2: Food and Agriculture Organization: Somalia Water and Land Management (percent sunshine)

== Economy ==
Burhakaba is a livestock trading hub due to its strategic location. On Mondays, business people from the surrounding areas come to this town to trade livestock. Agricultural products also contribute significantly to the town's GDP. Over the last ten years, cultivating has shifted from primarily crops to vegetables and fruits. Mondays have the highest level of economic activity compared to the other days of the week. There are also modern services such as telecommunications, internet access, and shopping malls.

== Health ==
Burhakaba has two hospitals (Hakaba Referral Hospital and Falsan Medical Center) and three MCHs (Sordes, BTSC, Geredo MCH, and Burhakaba), which mainly carry nutrition support in a mandated form. Pregnant women in the town do not visit it for antenatal or postnatal care. It also has a T.B. center and dozens of unregistered pharmacies and clinics. The town experienced cholera epidemics several times that claimed the lives of hundreds of people.

== Education ==
Burhakaba has one university and five primary and secondary schools (Dr. Ayub Sheekh Yarow, Amar Binu-Yasir, Zaad, Darulxikma and Albushra) and primary and intermediate schools (Waberi, Hakaba, Aaran, AlxunaynAnd Imamu-Nawawi) as well as dozens of madaris. There are three institutions; Banooda Institute of Science and Technology, Mountain Collage and Najuum international Collage.
