= Shaykh Sufi =

Abd Al-Rahman bin Abdallah al Shashi
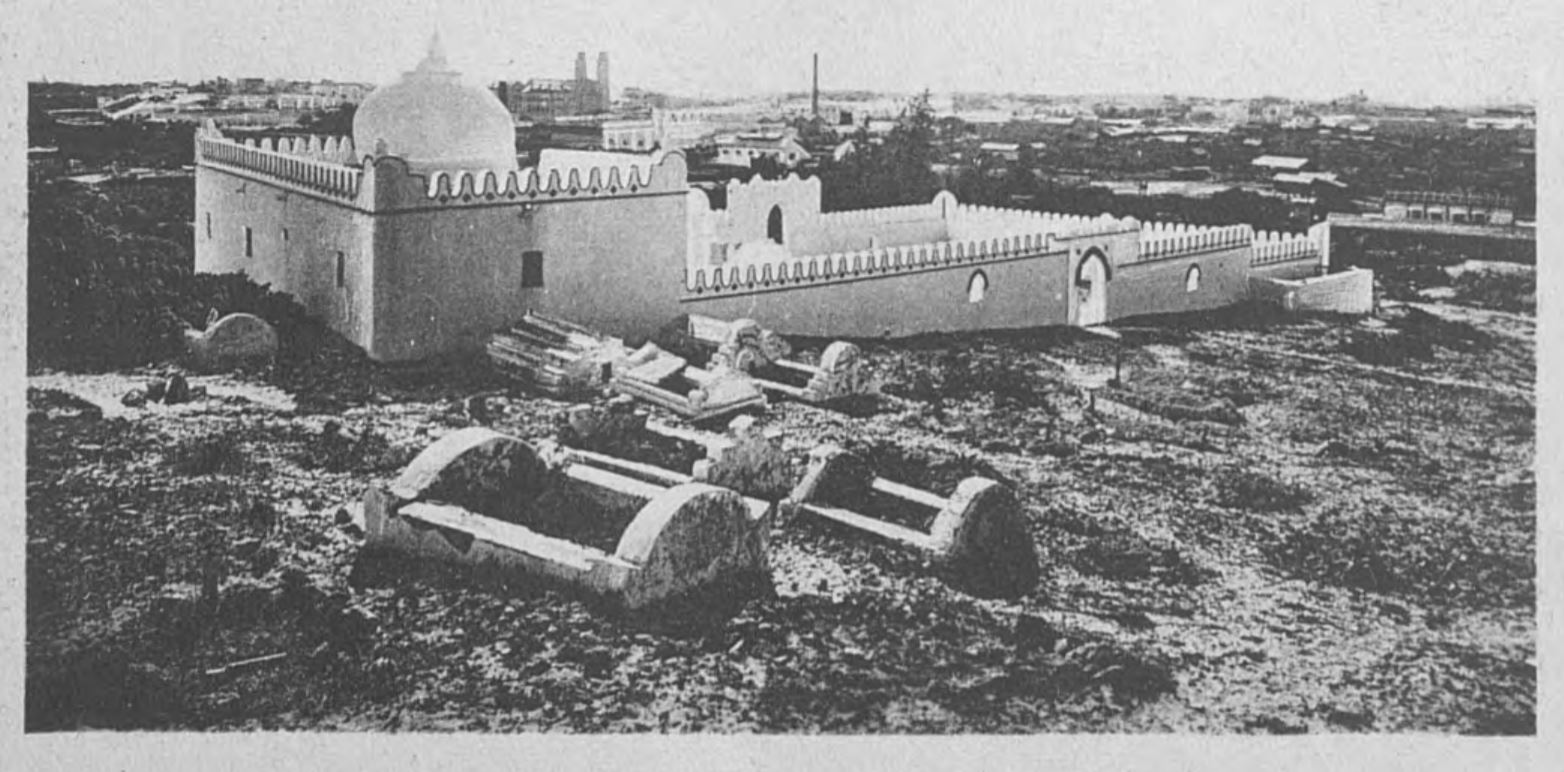
- The mosque of Sheikh Sufi (p. 1930)
- Title: Sheikh Suufi

Personal life
- Born: 1829 Mogadishu
- Died: 1904 (aged 74–75)
- Era: 19th century
- Main interest(s): Astrology, Poetry, Islamic philosophy, Islamic literature
- Occupation: Muslim scholar

Religious life
- Religion: Islam
- Jurisprudence: Shafi'i
- Creed: Sunni

Muslim leader
- Influenced by: Abdul Qadir Gilani, Abadir Umar ar-Rida, Al-Zayla'i
- Influenced: Uways Al-Barawi

Abd Al-Rahman bin Abdullah al Shashi (Arabic: عبد الرحمن بن عبد الله الشاشي) (b. 1829 - 1904), popularly known as Sheikh Sufi, was a 19th-century Benadiri scholar, poet, reformist and astrologist.

== Life ==
Sheikh Sufi was born in Mogadishu, where he founded the Qadiriyyah congregation, an Islamic school of thought or tariqah whose disciples included colleagues of his such as Uways al-Barawi. He studied astrology and wrote extensively on the future of Mogadishu and religious sciences, and authored popular books such as Shadjarat al Yakim ("The Tree of Certitude").

Besides his scholarly career, Sheikh Sufi was known as a great mediator between merchants and shop keepers in the coastal cities. As a reformist, he is credited with having put an end to what he considered to be the urbanites' immoral dancing rituals. In private, he also wrote many poems, which would eventually be taken up by fellow scholars such as Abdallah al-Qutbi in their books.

== Pilgrimage to his mausoleum ==
After his death in 1904, Shaykh Sufi's mausoleum became a site of annual pilgrimage for the faithful from across Somalia and East Africa. A cemetery was eventually constructed around his mausoleum, where prominent Somali ministers, entertainers and Presidents would also be buried.

== See also ==
- Islam in Somalia
- Abdallah al-Qutbi
