= Reer Manyo =

The Reer Manyo is a confederacy of clans based on the southern coast of Somalia, primarily in the cities of Mogadishu and Merca and the towns and villages between them.

== Etymology ==
Reer (Somali: Family) and Manyo (Somali: Sea), the etymological meaning of this clan confederacy immediately shows they are a group of people dedicated to the sea.

== Members ==
The Reer Gacanka Bari(Iskaashato) are made up of six clan groups, with four clans found in Mogadishu (primarily in Abdiaziz District, Shangani District, Hamar Weyne District, Karan District, and Hamar Jajab District) and four in Merca and its surrounding villages (two clans are found in both Mogadishu and Merca).

The clans that make up Reer Manyo are:

- Reer Macow (also known as Ba Muqtar)
- Reer Mehri Al-Afreer (Shaawis)
- Reer Omar (Gare Quraanyoow)
- Reer 'Aafi (also known as qubeys surre dir)
- Reer Haaji (also known as Shiiqaal Jaziira)
- Reer Hassan (also known as Shiiqaal aw Xasan)
