= Bravanese people =

Ethnic group in Somalia

Bravanese
Regions with significant populations
- Somalia and Kenya
- Kenya: 4,633 (2019)
- Somalia: 20,000 (2006)

Languages
- Chimini (a Swahili dialect), Somali

Religion
- Islam

Related ethnic groups
- Benadiris, Swahilis, Arabs

The Bravanese people, also known as the Barawani, are a Benadiri subclan minority ethnic group inhabiting the city of Barawe of Somalia and Kenya.

== Origins ==
As their name suggests, the Bravanese hail from Brava (Barawa), a port town on the southeastern coast of Somalia.

Barawa is one of the most diverse places in Somalia. The Somali people of this Banadir coast have mixed with many different ethnicities, such as Portuguese people, Italians and Arabs. Because of its location and distance from Asia, the Middle East, Europe, and nearby islands, Barawa was strategically located for trade, while people also exchanged ideas, skills, other knowledge and culture. The regional population supposedly traces their origins back to Arabs (particularly Hadhramis, Adnanis and Qahtanis). Many Bravanese people who have mixed with Somalis have origins from Europe, Мiddle Еast and Persia, therefore they tend to look physically distinct from the vast majority of other Somalis. Their culture, food and music resemble those of other East African islands and the Swahili people. The Bravanese people are locally known as "3 Tol" Haatim, Biido and Ashraf. According to many sources Bravanese people are made up of Haatim, Biida, and Asharaf.

== Language ==
The Bravanese speak the Bravanese language (Chimwiini or Chimini), Northern Dialect of Swahili. Chi- is a prefix denoting "language", and Miini (Mwiini) is the alternative name of Barawa, the Bravanese people themselves would never call the town as Barawa or Brava, but rather as Miini. Chimini is a standard version of the original Bravanese language which is called Chambalazi, the standard Chimini language contains Italian, and Arabic. Chambalazi contains some of the oldest Swahili words and dialects, it started to evolve through time and intermixing of other ethnicities and languages. The Barawa language is over 1000 years old, and still spoken today by approximately 30,000 Bravanese. This is due to the preservation of the language by the early scholars in Barawa. Sheikh Qassim al Barawi was the first Bravanese Scholar to start writing standard Chimini, which was written in Arabic. Throughout history, the language was used to spread Islam in the Swahili Coast, this was done via poetry and Religious books or manuscripts.

== Endangerment of language ==
As a result of Government Policy, such as the displacement of Nomadic Somalis into the Barawa Coast in 1974, this caused a culture shock and a threat to the language. Adding to that, political turmoil such as the Somali Civil war caused Bravanese to disperse all over the world, which resulted in the language being highly endangered in a short span of time. Brent Henderson, a researcher from the University of Florida conducted thorough research and documentation of the Barawa Language for three years. In his research, he highlighted the following quote in context:

"Whatever the factors responsible for the stabilization of Chimwiini over the past six hundred years, the situation has changed drastically within the past forty years largely due to political manoeuvrings... By 1972 all government officials were required to speak and write Somali [the national language of Somalia] and it was instituted in all public schools, including the school in Brava. ... [The] most important factor in the endangerment of Chimwiini was the eruption of civil war in Somalia in the early 1990s. ... Those who could leave Brava did so by whatever means possible. ... In just three decades, Chimwiini has gone from having a stable community of speakers to having its speakers scattered across the globe."

In April 2020, the Barawa language was once again under attack, authorities in the autonomous region of South West State of Somalia (Konfuur Galbeed) mandated a ban on Radio Barawa to not broadcast their shows and news in the Barawa Language. This caused a political backlash from Bravanese Communities and numerous Bravanese Politicians. As a result, the authorities were forced to rescind the ban and Radio Barawa resumed to normal.

== Representation in Somali Transitional Federal Parliament ==
The Hon. Burʽi Mohamed Hamza (Somali: Burci Maxamed Xamza, Arabic: البرعي محمد حمزة, died 25 June 2016) was a Somali-Canadian politician. He served as chairman and elected political leader of the Bravan community. From August 2012 to January 2014, he was a Member of the Federal Parliament of Somalia. He later served as the State Minister of Foreign Affairs and International Cooperation of Somalia from January to October 2014, and subsequently as the State Minister of Finance until December 2014. He was the State Minister of the Office for Environment at the time of his death.

== Notable people ==
=== Religious leaders ===
- ʿAbd al-ʿAzīz Al-Amawī Al-Barawi, was a scholar following the Shāfi‘ī school of jurisprudence and was also an adviser to several sultans of Zanzibar
- Muḥyī al-Dīn al-Qaḥṭānī Al-Wa'ili Al-Barawi
- Sheikh Nureini Ahmed Sabiri Al-Hatimi
- Dada Masiti
- Uways Al-Barawi
- Mu'alim Nuuri
- Sharif Qulateyn
- Sharif Mubidi
- Haji Sadiq
- Abdilkadir Khaajaa

=== Politics ===
- Jeilani Sheikh Bin Sheikh, was the first leader of The Hizbiya Digil-Mirifle (HDM) party, which was founded in 1947; it later became the Hizb al-Dastuur Mustaqil al-Somali where the first Election has taken place in Mogadisho, Hisbia (Xisbiya) and has been elected as the leader of (HDMS) Jeilani Sheikh Bin Sheikh, (Somali Independent Constitutional Party, HDMS).[21]
- Bur'i Hamza, was a Somali-Canadian politician. From August 2012 to January 2014, he was a Member of the Federal Parliament of Somalia. He later served as the State Minister of Foreign Affairs and International Cooperation of Somalia from January to October 2014, and subsequently as the State Minister of Finance until December 2014. He was the State Minister of the Premier's Office for Environment at the time of his death.
- Maryam Qasim, is a Somali politician. She served as the Minister for Human Development and Public Services of Somalia from November 2012 to January 2014. She is also the Chairperson of the Tayo Political Party. On 21 March 2017, she was appointed as the Minister of Humanitarian and Disaster Management by the Prime Minister Hassan Ali Khaire.
- Hamza Said Hamza, The current Minister of Humanitarian and Disaster Management
- Abdulkhadir Sakhawadeen, part of the 13 founding members of the SYL party in Somalia and also their first leader.
- Mohamed Barbe, part of the 13 founding members of the SYL party in Somalia
- Muna Kay
- Abu Mohamed Abu Chiaba, is a Kenyan Politician

== Entertainments ==
Bravanese people had many poets like Miimi and her son Abdulahi Mohamed Habib, who wrote various songs with the most popular singer called Habib Amin Bishaaro and many others. Local Bravanese investors called Sawt El Rahma launched the first music studio in the 80s in Brava where Mr Bishaaro used to make his songs that were mostly based on a true story in Brava until today is heard by youngsters and elders.

Mr Bishaaro, along with other artist have made songs for the Bravanese community that were all sang in Chimwini before the Somalia war in 1991, where he later died in a tragic car crash accident in Kenya in 1992, just after he launched his first album that was all written in Chimwiini, with the help of Ustad Juma Baalo studio a well known artist in Mombasa Kenya.

Bravanese Radio was launched in Brava after many Bravanese community members left the town, but later it started to get attention from politician where they have tried to stop the Bravanese Radio to not speak the Bravanese or Chimwiini language. They were later criticized by many other Somalian politicians in 2020.

A Bravanese group in the UK launched their first internet TV channel in 2020 called Bravanese TV Live when many were shocked about the news that occurred in one of the Somali popular TV channel that some politicians are urging the removal of Radio Brava and its Chimiini language and replace it with another Somali South West language.

== See also ==
- Bravanese dialect
- Haatim
- Biido
- Asharaf
- Benadiri
- Tunni
- Reer Faqi
