= Stefano Chimini =

Italian footballer (born 1993)

Personal information
- Date of birth: 23 May 1993 (age 33)
- Place of birth: Gavardo, Italy
- Height: 1.90 m (6 ft 3 in)
- Position: Goalkeeper

Youth career
- FeralpiSalò
- 2009–2012: AlbinoLeffe

Senior career*
Years	Team	Apps	(Gls)
2012–2015	AlbinoLeffe	0	(0)
2012–2013	→ FeralpiSalò (loan)	2	(0)
2013	→ Fersina Perginese (loan)	17	(0)
2013–2015	Monza	11	(0)
2015–2019	Dro Alto Garda	95	(0)
2019–2023	ASD Rovereto		
- * Club domestic league appearances and goals as of 22 February 2026

Stefano Chimini (born 23 May 1993) is an Italian footballer who plays as a goalkeeper.

== Career ==
Born in Gavardo, Lombardy, Chimini started his career at FeralpiSalò. In August 2009 he left for AlbinoLeffe in a temporary deal, which the club signed him outright in 2011. On 2 September 2011, Chimini received his only call-up from Italy national under-19 football team. He did not play. In 2012, he returned to FeralpiSalò. On 8 January 2013, Chimini was swapped with Paolo Branduani, but Chimini was immediately left for Serie D club Fersina Perginese in a temporary deal.

On 6 August 2013 he was signed by Monza in a co-ownership deal. On 20 June 2014, the co-ownership was renewed. On 26 June 2015 AlbinoLeffe reacquired Chimini.
