= Gondershe =

Gendershe Gondeershe El Torreh
- Town
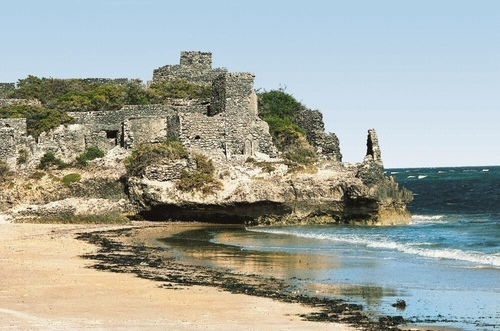
- Historical citadel ruins in Gondershe.

- Location within Somalia
- Coordinates: 1°47′55″N 44°54′28″E
- Country: Somalia
- State: South West
- Region: Lower Shabelle
- Time zone: UTC+3 (EAT)

Gondershe, also known as Gandershe (Somali pronunciation: [gõnd̪eːrʃe], گندىرشى Somali pronunciation: [gandeːrʒe]; or El Torreh Somali pronunciation: [eɫ t̪oːr̩a] Al-Toureh Arabic pronunciation: [at.tuːrah], Arabic: التوره, romanized: At-Tūrah; Swahili: Gonderashe Swahili pronunciation: [gondeɾaːʃiː]), is an archaeological site on the Somali Sea. It was at one point one of the most important districts of the Geledi Sultanate. Residents were largely from the Gendershe clan in the Lower Shabelle region of Southwest State of Somalia. Gondershe today is noted for its citadel and other various historical structures.

== Overview ==
Gondershe is situated about 35 kilometers northeast of Merca and about 30 kilometers southwest of Mogadishu.

It is an ancient stone city built on a coastal promontory. The town's ruins consist of typical Somali architecture, such as coral stone houses, fortifications, tombs and mosques. The town contains a shrine to Aw Usman Garweeyne (Garweyne).

The town is said to date from the medieval Ajuran period, when it became a center of trade that handled smaller vessels sailing from India, Arabia, Persia and the Far East. This is supported by early maps, and by an initial archaeological survey.

Gondershe later evolved into a popular tourist attraction during the 1960s, 1970s and 1980s. The film La Conchiglia (1992) by the award-winning Somali filmmaker Abdulkadir Ahmed Said was also shot here, and features the town's local residents.

== See also ==
- Hannassa
- Essina
- Sarapion
