= Dinsoor =

- Town
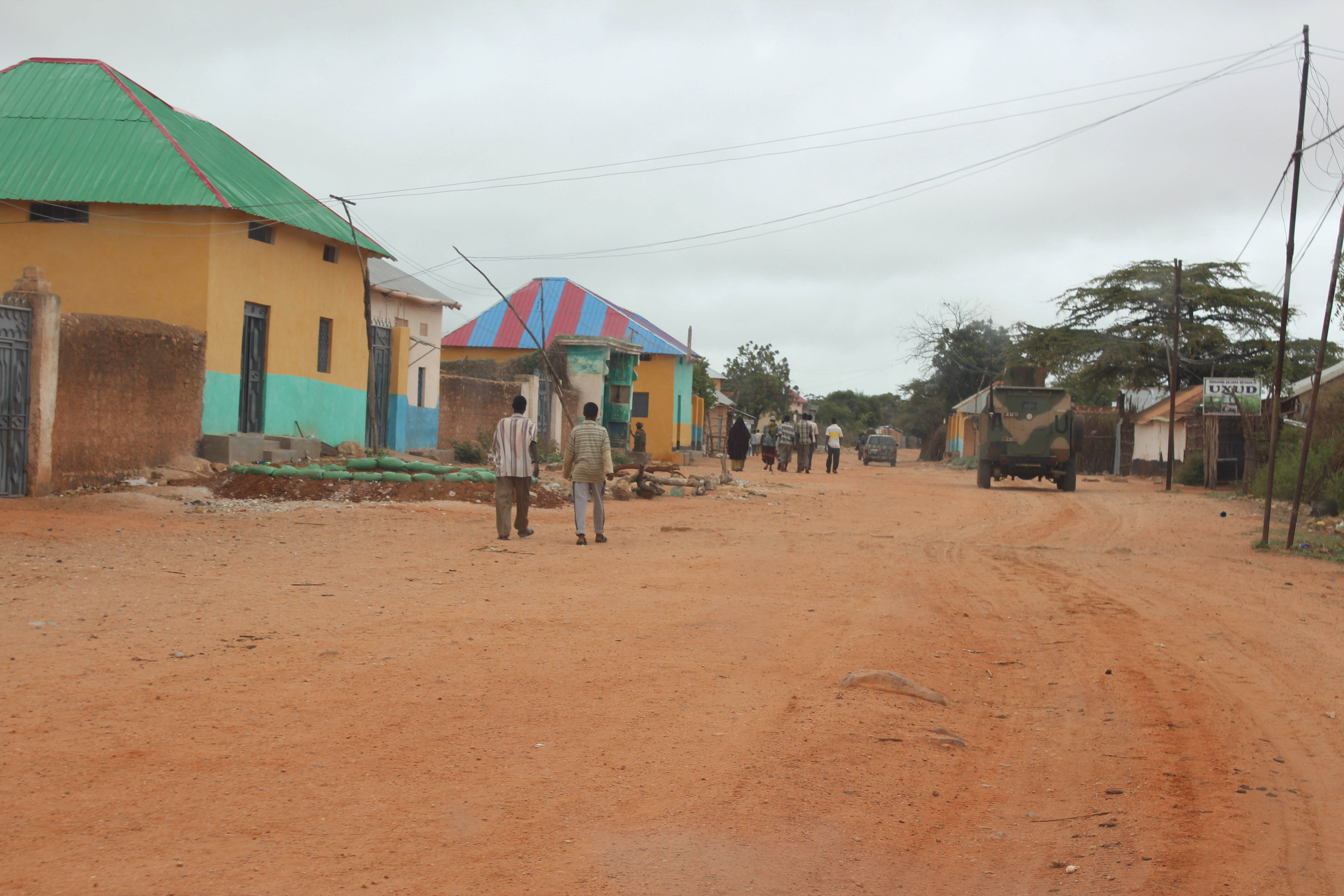
- Street in Dinsoor

- Location in Somalia.
- Coordinates: 2°24′38″N 42°58′36″E
- Country: Somalia
- Region: Bay
- District: Dinsoor

Population
  - Total: 19,600
- Time zone: UTC+3 (EAT)

Dinsoor (Somali: Diinsoor) is a town in the southwestern Bay region of Somalia. It is the center of the Dinsoor District.

== Demographics ==
Dinsoor has a population of around 19,600 inhabitants. The broader Dinsoor District has a total population of 75,769 residents.

== Notable residents ==
- Hasan Adan Samatar
