= Burʽi Mohamed Hamza =

Burʽi Mohamed Hamza البرعي محمد حمزة
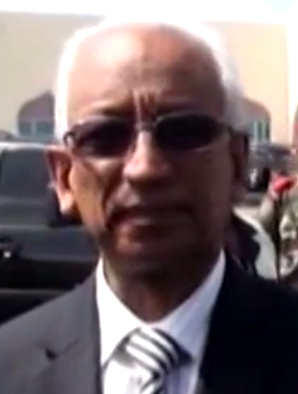
- Succeeded by: Abdullahi Mohamed Noor

Personal details
- Born: 1945
- Party: Independent

Burʽi Mohamed Hamza (Somali: Burci Maxamed Xamza, Arabic: البرعي محمد حمزة (born 1945 – died 25 June 2016) was a Somali-Canadian politician. From August 2012 to January 2014, he was a Member of the Federal Parliament of Somalia. He later served as the State Minister of Foreign Affairs and International Cooperation of Somalia from January to October 2014, and subsequently as the State Minister of Finance until December 2014. He was the State Minister of the Premier's Office for Environment at the time of his death.

== Federal Parliament of Somalia ==
On 20 August 2012, Hamza was among the legislators nominated to the newly established Federal Parliament of Somalia.

== Cabinet of Somalia ==
=== State Minister of Foreign Affairs and International Cooperation ===
==== Appointment ====
On 17 January 2014, Hamza was appointed State Minister of Foreign Affairs and International Cooperation by Prime Minister of Somalia Abdiweli Sheikh Ahmed.

==== Somalia-Yemen bilateral cooperation ====
In May 2014, Hamza met with the Yemeni Ambassador to Somalia Fu'ad Mohamed Al Zorqah to discuss bilateral cooperation. The conference was held at the Foreign Affairs Ministry compound in Mogadishu and touched on a number of issues, including the launching of a direct flight between Mogadishu and Sana'a. Operated by Al Saeda Airlines, it is the first air route directly linking both capitals since the collapse of Somalia's former central government in 1991.

==== Arab League development cooperation ====
In May 2014, Hamza met with the Arab League Ambassador to Somalia Mohamed Abdalla Idiris to discuss development cooperation. The conference was held at the Foreign Affairs Ministry compound in Mogadishu, and focused on the League of Arab States' commitment to support the post-conflict rebuilding process in member state Somalia. To this end, the United Arab Emirates, Saudi Arabia and Qatar responded to a pledge by the Arab League Secretary General Nabil el-Araby to raise funds for the reconstruction initiatives in Somalia.

=== State Minister of Finance ===
On 25 October 2014, Hamza's term as State Minister of Foreign Affairs and International Cooperation ended following a Cabinet reshuffle. He was reassigned the State Minister of Finance office.

=== End of term ===
On 17 December 2014, Hamza's term as State Minister ended following the appointment of a new Prime Minister-designate, Omar Abdirashid Ali Sharmarke. In his farewell speech, Hamza urged Somali youth to participate in the national reconstruction projects, and encouraged university students to further their studies and promote peace. He also called on Somali professionals in the diaspora to return home and take part in the local development initiatives.

=== State Minister of Premier's Office for Environment ===
On 6 February 2015, Hamza was appointed the State Minister of the Premier's Office for Environment.

== Personal life ==
Hamza, a naturalized Canadian, was married with two children in Woodbridge, Ontario.

== Death ==
Hamza died during an attack by at least four al-Shabab militants on the Hotel Naso-Hablod in Mogadishu on 25 June 2016. His room collapsed on him after it was damaged by a car bomb. The hotel was "frequented by apostate government workers", explained spokesman Sheikh Abdiasis Abu Musab to Reuters.
