= Ashraf Somali =

Dialect of the Somali language

Ashraaf
- Af-Ashraaf
- Native to: Somalia
- Region: Lower Shabelle; Banaadir
- Ethnicity: Asharaf Somalis
- Language family: Afro-Asiatic: Cushitic; Lowland East; Macro-Somali; Somali; Ashraaf

Language codes
- ISO 639-3: (included in Somali [som])
- Glottolog: afas1238

Ashraf (Somali: Af-Ashraaf) is a speech variety of Somali spoken in the Marka district of the Lower Shebelle region and Banaadir region of southern Somalia.

== Classification ==
According to Blench (2006) there are two sub-dialects: Shingaani and Lower Shebelle. As noted in recent work on the speech variety, Green & Jones (2016):

"What we hope to have illustrated in this talk is that while Marka (Af Ashraaf) may be similar in certain ways to both Northern Somali and Maay, it nonetheless boasts a number of unique properties, particularly in its morphology, that we believe merit its treatment not as a Somali or Maay dialect, but as a language variety of its own"

A similar level of skepticism towards the labelling of other Omo-Tana languages in Somalia (such as Maay, Dabarre, Jiddu) is expressed in Tosco (2012):

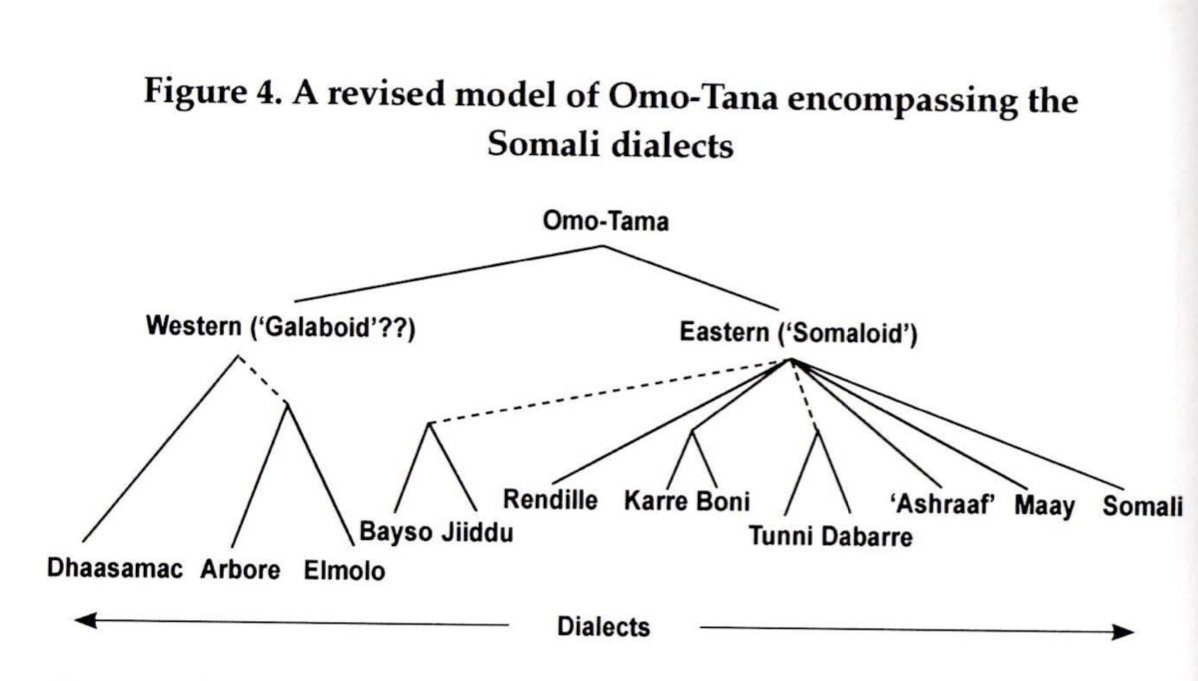
Tosco's model for classifying Omo-Tana, acknowledging both the sociolinguistic situation of Cushitic languages in Somalia labeled as "dialects" of Somali and their actual classification as languages apart from Somali

"It is well-known that the term 'dialects' may refer to different 'things'. Within Somalia, it is safe to say that all the Somali dialects are 'dialects' from a sociolinguistic point of view, that is, in terms of their social role, their general absence in written media, and the speakers' acceptance of Northern-Central Somali as a common medium. From a strictly linguistic point of view, however, mutual comprehension should be assessed and dialects labelled accordingly (as mutually understandable varieties of a language). No classification so far does that."

== Phonology ==
The phonological inventory of Ashraaf is as follows:

Consonant phonemes
| | Bilabial | | Labio- dental | Dental | Alveolar | | Post- alveolar (Palato- alveolar) | Retroflex | Palatal | Velar | | Uvular | Pharyngeal | Glottal |
|---|---|---|---|---|---|---|---|---|---|---|---|---|---|---|
| Plosive | | b | | | t | d | | ɖ | | k | ɡ | | | ʔ |
| Fricative | (ɸ) | (β) | f | (ð) | s | | ʃ | | | | ɣ | χ | ħ ʕ | h |
| Nasal | | m | | | | n | | | | | | | | |
| Trill | | | | | | r | | | | | | | | |
| Approximant | | | | | | | | | j | | | | | |
| Lateral approximant | | | | | | l | | | | | | | | |

Vowels
| | Front | Central | Back |
|---|---|---|---|
| Close | /i/, /iː/ | | /u/, /uː/ |
| Mid | /e/, /eː/ | | /o/, /oː/ |
| Open | | /a/, /aː/ | |

== See also ==
- Northern Somali
- Benadiri Somali
