= Asharaf =

Somali clan

أشراف

Regions with significant populations
- (Somalia) Somalia (Kenya) Kenya; Ethiopia

Languages
- Ashraf

Religion
- Islam ^{(Sunni)}

The Asharaf, also spelled Ashraf (from the Arabic: أشراف, romanized: ashrāf, lit. 'nobles'), is a Somali clan. Their name is the plural of sharīf, an originally Arabic term designating those who claim descent from the family of the Islamic prophet Muhammad.

Belonging to the larger group of Somali clans living in the southern parts of the country called the Benadiri, they fall outside of the traditional Somali clan structures and are often marginalized within Somalia. As a minority, they have been the target of violent Islamist groups such as the al-Shabaab.

Contrary to most other Somali clans, who trace their ancestry to Muhammad's cousin and Ali's older brother Aqil ibn Abi Talib, the Asharaf claim descent from Hasan and Husayn, the sons of Ali and Muhammad's daughter Fatima. Like the claims of other Somali clans in this regard, this alleged genealogy is historically untenable, and may be understood as part of what Sada Mire has called "the Somali Islamic myth of origin".

== Clan structure ==
The claimed genealogical structure of the Asharaf clan is as follows:

- Hasan ibn Ali
  - Mohamed Sharif
  - Sharif Ali
  - Sharif Ahmed
  - Ashraf Sarman
  - unnamed others
- Husayn ibn Ali
  - Reer Sharif Magbuul
  - Sharif Ahmed
  - Sharif Balaaw
  - unnamed others

== Notable figures ==
- Sharif Hassan
- Dada Masiti, Mana Sitti Habib Jamaladdin (Arabic: مانا ستي حبيب جمال الدين) (c. 1810s – 15 July 1919), commonly known as Dada Masiti ("Grandmother Masiti"), was an Ashraf poet, mystic and Islamic scholar. She composed her poetry in the Bravanese dialect spoken in Barawa.
- Sharif Aydurus, a scholar of Islamic and Somali history and pan-Islamic leader
- Shariif Imaankeey, Mayor of Mogadishu from September 1963–1965
- Shariif Caydaruus, Mayor of Mogadishu from 1966–1970

== See also ==
- Demographics of Somalia
- Samaale, legendary forefather of many other Somali clans, also claimed to be descended from the (wider) family of Muhammad
- Sharif, the Arabic word from which the clan derives its name
