= Bravanese dialect =

Swahili variety of Somalia

Bravanese
- Mwiini
- Chimwiini
- Native to: Somalia
- Region: Barawa
- Ethnicity: Bravanese
- Native speakers: (40,000 cited 1992)
- Language family: Niger–Congo?: Atlantic–Congo; Benue–Congo; Bantoid; Bantu; Northeast Coast Bantu; Sabaki; Swahili; Bravanese

Language codes
- ISO 639-3: (included in Kiswahili [swh])
- Glottolog: chim1312
- Guthrie code: G.412
- ELP: Mwini

Bravanese, also called Chimwiini (ChiMwini, Mwiini, Mwini) or Chimbalazi, is a language related to Swahili spoken by the Bravanese people, who are the predominant inhabitants of Barawa or Brava, in Somalia. Maho (2009) considers it a distinct dialect, and it has been classified as a Northern Dialect of Swahili. However, it strongly distinguishes itself from standard Swahili under all linguistic considerations.

Due to the ongoing Somali Civil War, most speakers have left the region and are scattered throughout the world in ex-refugee immigrant communities in places such as Columbus and Atlanta in the United States, London and Manchester in the United Kingdom, and Mombasa, Kenya. It has fewer than 15,000 speakers.

Bravanese may have once served as a regional lingua franca due to the key coastal location of Barawa. One piece of linguistic evidence for this comes from morphological reduction. For example, it has a three-way tense system, which is simpler than that of neighboring Bantu dialects historically spoken in Somalia.

== See also ==
- Bravanese people
