= Benadiri Somali =

Dialect of the Somali language

Benaadir
- Af Reer Xamar
- Native to: Somalia
- Region: Benadir coast
- Ethnicity: Hawiye & Benadiri
- Native speakers: 1.9 million (2021)
- Language family: Afro-Asiatic: Cushitic; Lowland East; Macro-Somali; Somali; Benaadir

Language codes
- ISO 639-3: –
- Glottolog: bena1268

Benadiri Somali, also referred to as "Coastal Somali" (Somali: Af Reer Xamar), is a dialect of the Somali language. It is primarily spoken by the Benadiri people, who inhabit the southern Banaadir coast of Somalia and into Kenya.

== Overview ==
Benadiri Somali is spoken on the Benadir coast, spanning from Hobyo to south of Merca including Mogadishu, as well as in the immediate hinterland. The coastal dialects have additional phonemes that do not exist in Standard Somali. Linguist Giorgio Banti states the dialect has loan words from Harari language.

Benadiri Somali is also referred to as Coastal Somali or Af-Reer Xamar ("Language of the People of Hamar"). The dialect is widely considered a southern coastal dialect.
