= Merca =

Merca Marka (Somali) مركة (Arabic) مَركة (Wadaad)
- City
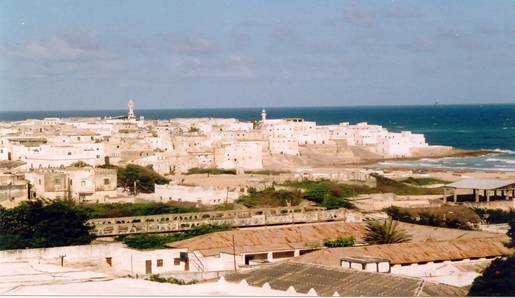
- Merca beachside
- Nickname: Marka Cadey
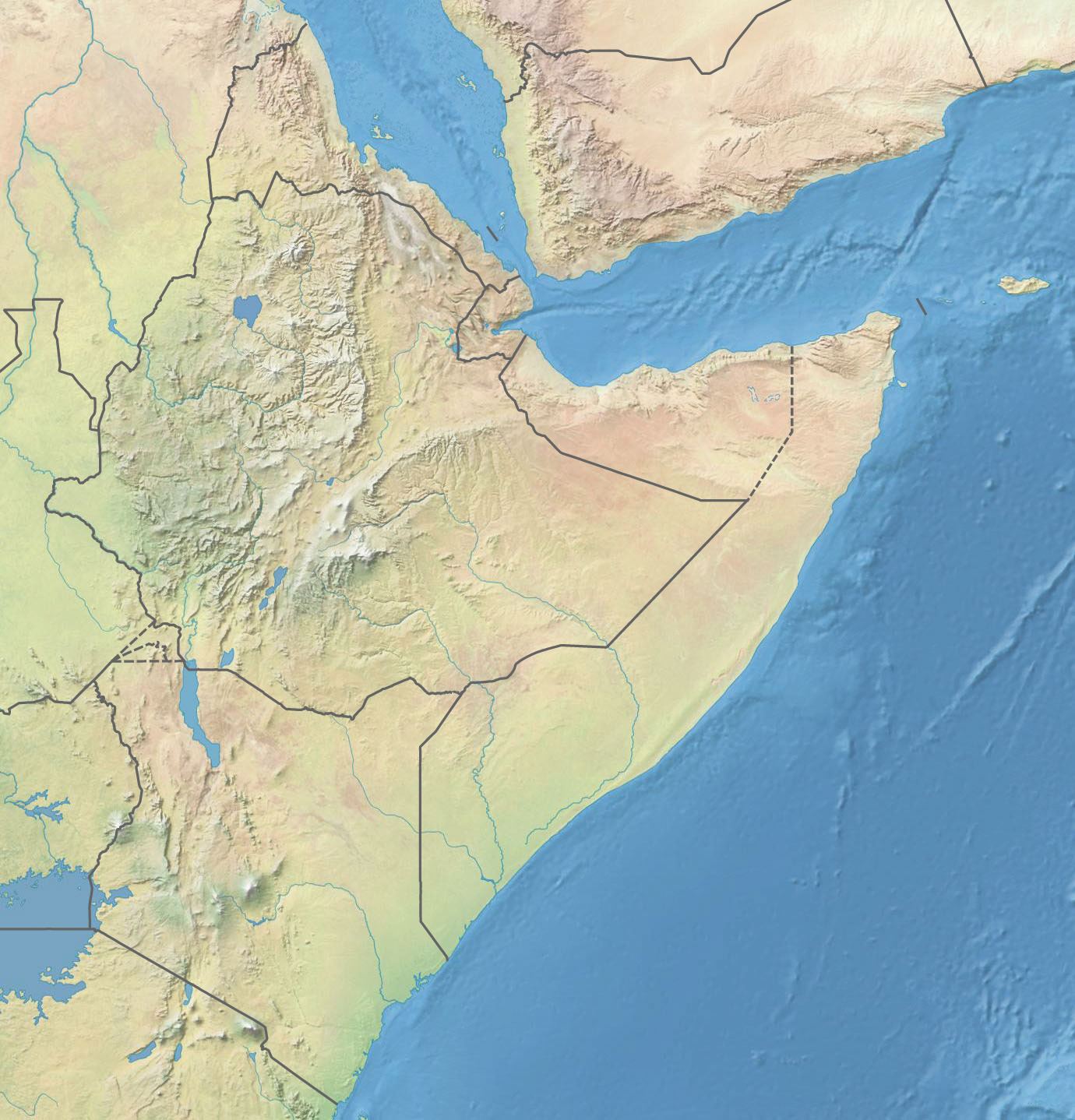
- Location within Somalia Location within the Horn of Africa Location within Africa Merca (Africa)
- Coordinates: 01°42′48″N 044°45′56″E
- Country: Somalia
- Region: Lower Shabelle
- Founded: 1000 BC

Government
  - Mayor and Governor: Osman Muuse Mohamed

Population (2021)
  - City: 230,100
  - Urban: 716,361
- Time zone: UTC+3 (EAT)

Merca (Somali: Marka; Arabic: مركة) is the capital city of the Lower Shebelle province of Somalia, a historic port city in the region. It is located approximately 109 km (68 mi) to the southwest of the nation's capital Mogadishu. Merca is the traditional home territory of the Bimal clan and was the center of the Bimal revolt.

== History ==
=== Antiquity ===
The city of Essina is believed to have been the predecessor state of Merca. It used to be an ancient Proto-Somali emporium city-state. It is mentioned in the Periplus of the Erythraean Sea, a Greek travel document dating from the first century AD, as one of a series of commercial ports on the Somali littoral. According to the Periplus, maritime trade already connected peoples in the Merca area with other communities along the Somali Sea coast.

=== Medieval Period ===
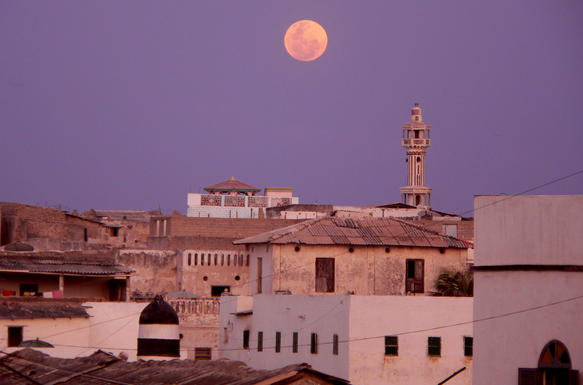
Minaret and moonrise in Merca

According to the 12th-century author Al-Idrisi the Hawiye occupied the coastal areas between Ras Hafun and Merca, as well as the lower basin of the lower Shabelle river. Al-Idrisi's mention of the Hawiye is the first documentary reference to a specific Somali group in the Horn. Later Arab writers also make references to the Hawiye clan in connection with both Merca and the lower Shabelle valley. Ibn Sa'id (1214–74), for instance, considered Merca to be the capital of the Hawiye, who lived in fifty villages on the bank of a river which he called the Nile of Mogadishu, a clear reference to the Shabelle river. Yaqut al-Hamawi, another thirteen-century Arab geographer also mentions Merca, which he says belonged to the Black Berbers considered ancestors of modern Somalis.

During the Middle Ages, the area was one of several prominent administrative centers of the Ajuran Sultanate. The polity formed one of the largest kingdoms in the Horn region. Various pillar tombs exist in the region, which local tradition holds were built in the 15th century when the Sultanate's naa'ibs governed the district. According to Ibn Sa'id in the thirteenth century described nearby Merca as one of the three most important cities on the East African coast along with Mogadishu and Barawa all serving as the commercial and Islamic centers for the Indian Ocean.

Following the decline of Ajuran Sultanate. In the vicinity of Merca, a mysterious group known as the El Amir made its appearance between 1650 and 1700. According to an account collected by Guillain in 1847, a leader known as Amir, believed to originate from the Abgaal, formed a following or "tribe" which invaded the territory of Merca and expelled the Ajuran clan. The El Amir ruled for thirty-four years until the Biimaal expelled them and definitively occupied Merca.

=== Early Modern ===
One of the most powerful sultanates to have emerged from Southern Somalia called the Geledi Sultanate centered in Afgooye in the late 17th century. The Sultanate of Geledi tried to attack and destroy the Bimaal clan many times to try to capture the coastal city of Merca. But the Bimal of Merca managed to defeat the Geledi Sultanate two times. In 1843 Yusuf Mahamud, the Sultan of Geledi, vowed to destroy the Bimaal once and for all and mobilizes the Geledi army. In 1848 the sultan of the Geledi, Yusuf Mahamud was killed at Adaddey Suleyman, a village near Merca, in a battle between the Bimaal and Geledi Sultanates. His son Sultan Ahmed Yusuf tried to seek revenge but was also killed in 1878 at Agaaran, near Marka by the Bimal. This caused a steady decline in the Geledi Sultanate.

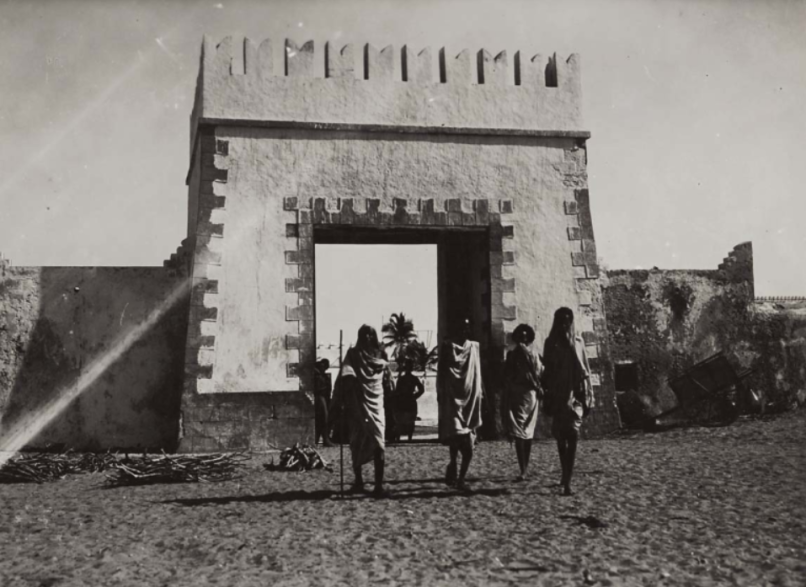
The walls of Merca photographed in 1928 the traditional stronghold of the Bimaal

==== Bimal Revolt ====
The Bimal revolt, Bimal resistance, or Banadir resistance was a guerrilla war against the Italian Somaliland in southern Somalia. It was fought from the years 1896 to 1926 and largely concentrated in the Lower Shebelle, Banadir, and Middle Shebelle. The war was centered around Merka and Danane.

It is compared to the war of the Mad Mullah in northern Somalia. Named after the Bimal clan since they were the major element in the resistance.

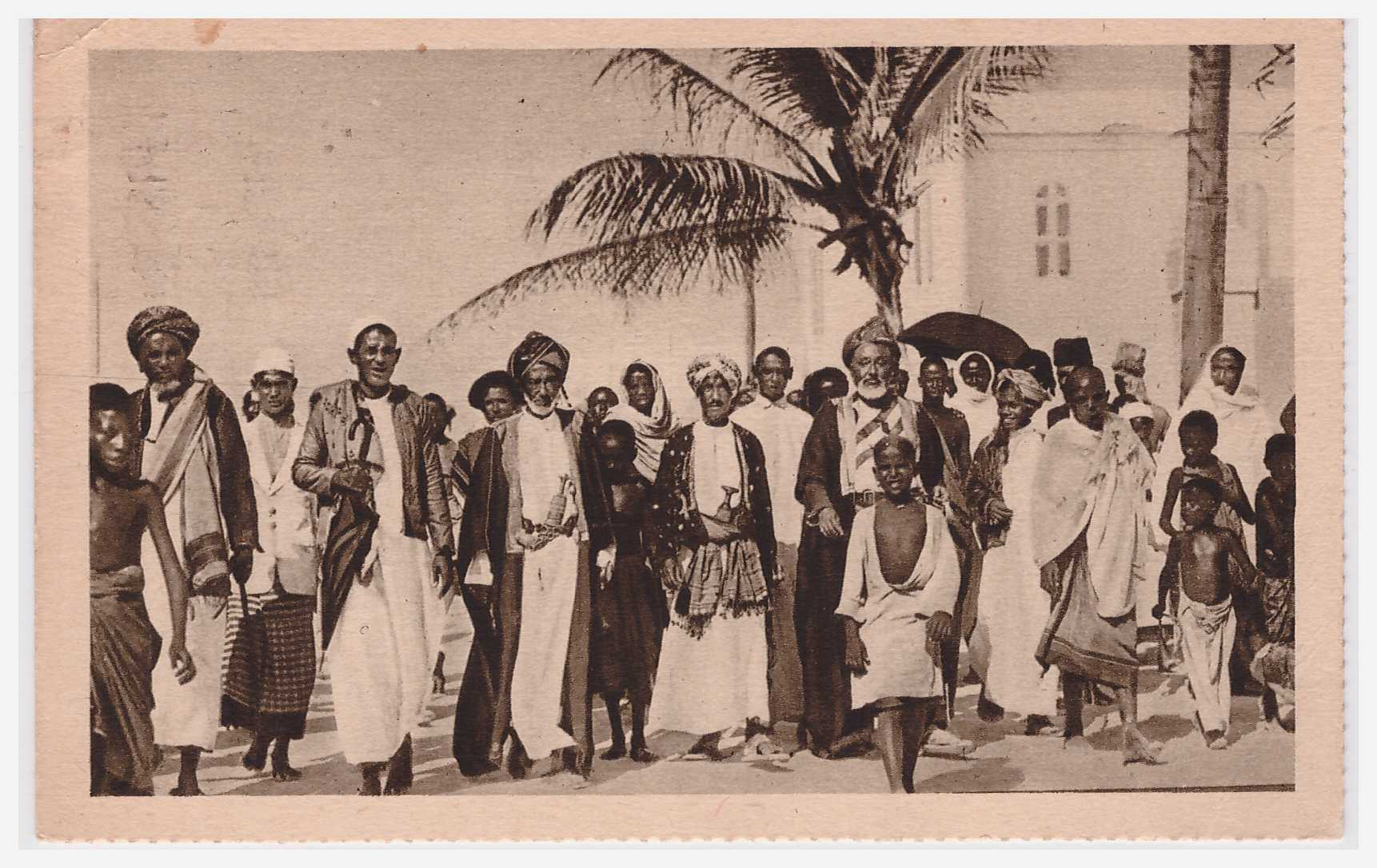
Notable elders and the Sultan belonging to the Bimal clan in Merca

For more about Bimal or Merca revolt see:

==== Modern ====
In the 1930s a group of Italian Somalis established residency in Merca. The Port of Merca was the oldest port in Italian Somalia and was nicknamed the "port of bananas" due to its status as a key exporter of bananas from Somalia to Europe. In the city of Merca there was a huge economic development in the 1930s, due mainly to the growing commerce of the port of Merca connected by small railway to the farm area of Genale.

Following the full outbreak of the Somali Civil War in 1991, Merca came under the control of Al-Itihaad Al-Islamiya, a Islamist group who soon after started governing the city. Al-Itihaad controlled the city until US troops landed in Somalia during December 1992. In this period the organization relinquished of the port control to the US military peacefully.

Merca was abandoned by government forces and captured by Al-Shabaab in February 2016. It was recaptured by the Somali National Army along with African Union troops, a few days later. A small battle was fought in which a Somali soldier, several militants, and four civilians died.

On 27 July 2022, an Al-Shabaab suicide bomber killed mayor Abdullahi Ali Ahmed Waafow and twenty other people while Waafow was giving a speech.

== Demographics ==
According to the UNDP in 2005, Merca had a population of around 250,000 inhabitants. it is primarily inhabited by Biimaal Clan with there being a recognizable amount of other Somali tribes.

== Transportation ==
Merca has a jetty-class seaport, the Port of Merca.

The nearest airport to the city is the K50 Airport in the Lower Shebelle province.

Otherwise, most people take the Aden Adde Airport in Mogadishu and then take an hour and 30 minute bus ride to Merca

== Notable people ==
- Asha Jama, social activist, and former TV reporter and journalist.
- Sheikh Abibakar Gafle, described as one of the best-known resistance leaders in Southern Somalia and from Merca.
- Ali Maow Maalin, the last person known to have been naturally infected by Variola minor smallpox
- Abdullahi Ali Ahmed Waafow, former mayor of Merca and Member of Parliament

== See also ==
- Port of Merca
- Mogadishu
- Barawa

== Sources ==
- Huntingford, George Wynn Brereton (1980). The Periplus of the Erythraean Sea. Ashgate Publishing. ISBN 978-0-904180-05-3.
- Jama, Mohamed (1962). An Introduction to Somali History from 5000 Years B.C. Down to the Present Time.
