= History of Mogadishu =

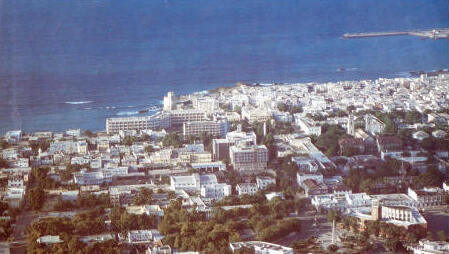
Prior to the civil war, Mogadishu was known as the White pearl of the Indian Ocean.

Mogadishu (Somali: Muqdisho, popularly Xamar; Arabic: مقديشو) is the largest city in Somalia and the nation's capital. Located in the coastal Benadir region on the Indian Ocean, the city has served as an important port for centuries.

== Antiquity ==
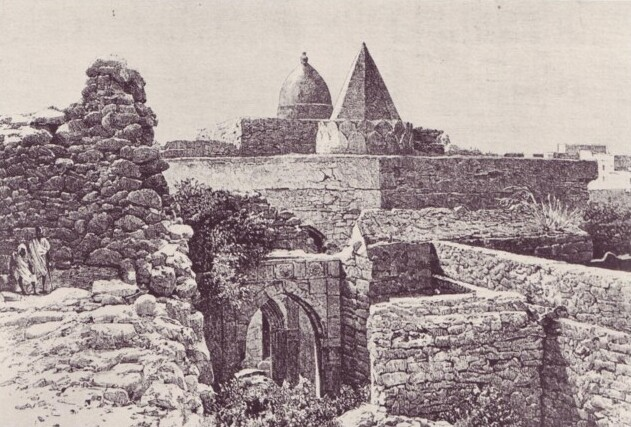
Engraving of the 13th century Fakr ad-Din Mosque built by Fakr ad-Din, the first Sultan of the Sultanate of Mogadishu

=== Sarapion ===
The ancient city of Sarapion is believed to have been the city state of Mogadishu. It is mentioned in the Periplus of the Erythraean Sea, a Greek travel document dating from the first century AD, as one of a series of commercial ports on the Somali littoral. According to the Periplus, maritime trade already connected peoples in the Mogadishu area with other communities along the Somali Sea coast.

During ancient times Mogadishu was part of the Somali city-states that engaged in a lucrative trade network connecting Somali merchants with Phoenicia, Ptolemaic Egypt, Greece, Parthian Persia, Saba, Nabataea and the Roman Empire. Somali sailors used the ancient Somali maritime vessel known as the beden to transport their cargo.

== Foundation and origins ==
The founding ethnicity of Mogadishu and its subsequent sultanate has been a topic of serious intrigue in Somali Studies. Ioan Lewis and Enrico Cerulli believed that the city was founded and ruled by a council of Arab and Persian families. However, the reference I.M Lewis and Cerulli received traces back to one 19th-century text called the Kitab Al-Zunuj, which has been discredited by modern scholars as unreliable, and unhistorical. More importantly, it contradicts oral, ancient written sources and archeological evidence on the pre-existing civilizations and communities that flourished on the Somali coast, and to which were the forefathers of Mogadishu and other coastal cities. Thus, the Persian and Arab founding "myths" are regarded as an outdated false colonialist reflection on the Somalis' ability to create their own sophisticated states. It has now been widely accepted that there were already existing communities on the Somali coast with local Somali leadership, to whom the Arab and Persian families had to ask for permission to settle in their cities. It also seems the local Somalis still retained their political and numerical superiority while the Muslim immigrants would eventually assimilate into the dominant Somali culture.

Mogadishu along with Zeila and other Somali coastal cities was founded upon an indigenous network involving hinterland trade and that happened even before significant Arab migrations or trade with the Somali coast. That goes back approximately four thousand years and are supported by archaeological and textual evidences.

This is corroborated by the 1st century AD Greek document the Periplus of the Erythraean Sea, detailing multiple prosperous port cities in ancient Somalia, as well as the identification of ancient Sarapion with the city that would later be known as Mogadishu. Archaeologist Ahmed Dualeh Jama has identified the now entirely ruined Xamar Jajab—covering roughly 5 km²—as the oldest quarter and former core of Mogadishu, predating the still extant Shingani and Xamarweyne). Gualtiero Benardelli describes Xamar Jajab as a significant urban center once inhabited by a wealthy, sedentary population that practiced agriculture. Moreover, older inland settlements have been found at Afgooye and Gezeira in the Mogadishu hinterland, further supporting the city’s early rise.

When Ibn Battuta visited the Sultanate in the 14th century, he identified the Sultan as being of Barbara origin, an ancient term to describe the ancestors of the Somali people. According to Ross E. Dunn neither Mogadishu, or any other city on the coast could be considered alien enclaves of Arabs or Persians, but were in-fact African towns.

Yaqut al-Hamawi, a famous Muslim medieval geographer in the year 1220 describes Mogadishu as the most prominent town on the coast. Yaqut also mentioned Mogadishu as being a town inhabited by Berbers, described as ”dark-skinned” and considered ancestors of modern Somalis. By the thirteenth century, Ibn Sa'id described Mogadishu, Merca and Barawa located in the Benadir coast had become Islamic and commercial centers in the Indian Ocean. He said the local people in the Benadir coast and the interior were predominantly inhabited by Somalis with a minority of Arab, Persian and Indian merchants living in the coastal towns. Ibn al-Mujawir mentions the Banu Majid who fled the Mundhiriya region in Yemen in the year 1159 and settled in Mogadishu and also traders from the port towns of Abyan and Haram.

Mogadishu is traditionally inhabited by 4 main Reer Hamar Gibil Madow (Dark skins) clan groupings (Somali: afarta reer xamar). These are the Moorshe, Iskashato, DhabarWeyne, and the Bandawow. With Moorshe being regarded as the oldest group in Mogadishu and is considered to be a sub-clan of Ajuran who established one of the most powerful medieval kingdoms in Africa called Ajuran Sultanate. The Gibil Madow(Dark skins) faction of the Benadiri are said to hail from various Somali clan groups and make up the majority of Benadiris with a small minority being Gibil Cads(Light skins) which descend from Muslim immigrants.

== Medieval Period ==
=== Mogadishu Sultanate ===
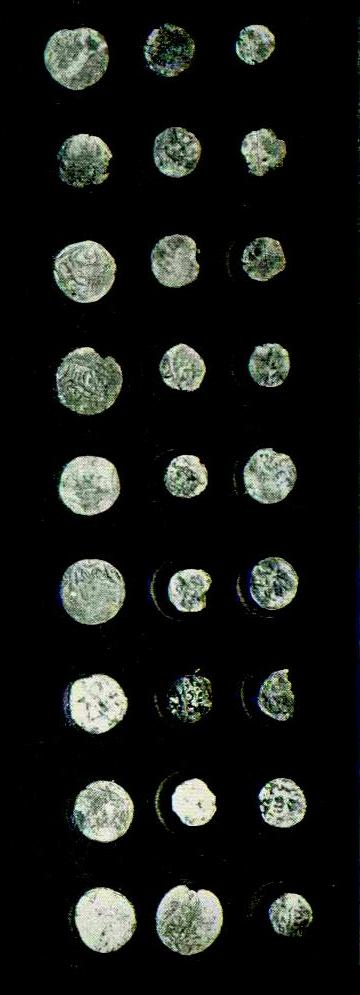
Mogadishan currency

Mogadishu Sultanate was a medieval Somali sultanate centered in southern Somalia. It rose as one of the pre-eminent powers in the Horn of Africa under the rule of Fakhr ad-Din before becoming part of the expanding Ajuran Empire in the 13th century. The Mogadishu Sultanate maintained a vast trading network, dominated the regional gold trade, minted its own currency, and left an extensive architectural legacy in present-day southern Somalia. A local city-state which much influence over the hinterland neighboring coastal towns.

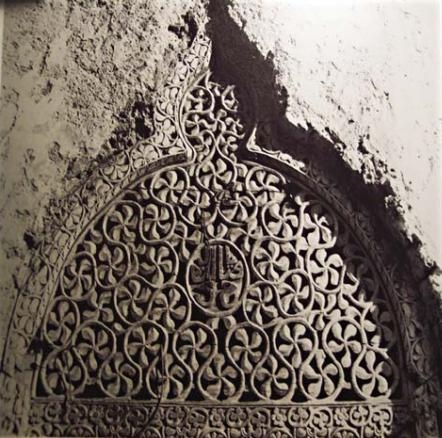
Entrance of a coral stone house in Mogadishu.

For many years Mogadishu functioned as the pre-eminent city in the بلد البربر (Bilad al Barbar – "Land of the Berbers"), as medieval Arabic-speakers named the Somali coast. Following his visit to the city, the 12th-century Syrian historian Yaqut al-Hamawi (a former slave of Greek origin) wrote a global history of many places he visited Mogadishu and called it the richest and most powerful city in the region and was an Islamic center across the Indian Ocean.

Flag of the Ajuran, a Somali empire of which medieval Mogadishu was an important city.

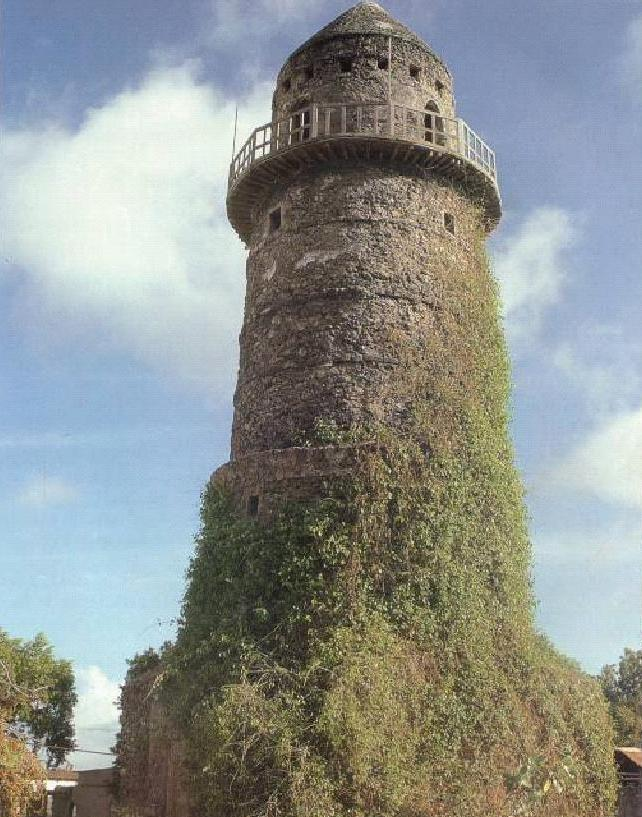
Almnara Tower, Mogadishu

=== Ajuran Sultanate ===
In the early 13th century, Mogadishu along with other coastal and interior Somali cities in southern Somalia and eastern Abyissina came under the Ajuran Sultanate control and experienced another Golden Age. By the 1500s, Mogadishu was no longer a vassal state and became a full fledged Ajuran city. An Ajuran family, Muduffar, established a dynasty in the city, thus combining two entities together for the next 350 years, the fortunes of the urban cities in the interior and coast became the fortunes of the other.

During his travels, Ibn Sa'id al-Maghribi (1213–1286) noted that Mogadishu city had already become the leading Islamic center in the region. By the time of the Moroccan traveller Ibn Battuta's appearance on the Somali coast in 1331, the city was at the zenith of its prosperity. He described Mogadishu as "an exceedingly large city" with many rich merchants, which was famous for its high quality fabric that it exported to Egypt, among other places. He also describes the hospitality of the people of Mogadishu and how locals would put travelers up in their home to help the local economy. Battuta added that the city was ruled by a Somali Sultan, Abu Bakr ibn Shaikh 'Umar, He noted that Sultan Abu Bakr had dark skin complexion and spoke in his native tongue (Somali) but was also fluent in Arabic. The Sultan also had a retinue of wazirs (ministers), legal experts, commanders, royal eunuchs, and other officials at his beck and call. Ibn Khaldun (1332 to 1406) noted in his book that Mogadishu was a massive metropolis. He also claimed that the city was a very populous with many wealthy merchants.

This period gave birth to notable figures like Abd al-Aziz of Mogadishu who was described as the governor and island chief of Maldives by Ibn Battuta After him is named the Abdul-Aziz Mosque in Mogadishu which has remained there for centuries.

The island's appellation "Madagascar" is not of local origin but rather was popularized in the Middle Ages by Europeans. The name Madageiscar was first recorded in the memoirs of 13th-century Venetian explorer Marco Polo as a corrupted transliteration of the name Mogadishu, the famous port with which Polo had confused the island.

Vasco Da Gama, who passed by Mogadishu in the 15th century, noted that it was a large city with houses of four or five storeys high and big palaces in its centre and many mosques with cylindrical minarets. In the 16th century, Duarte Barbosa noted that many ships from the Kingdom of Cambaya sailed to Mogadishu with cloths and spices for which they in return received gold, wax and ivory. Barbosa also highlighted the abundance of meat, wheat, barley, horses, and fruit on the coastal markets, which generated enormous wealth for the merchants. Mogadishu, the center of a thriving weaving industry known as toob benadir (specialized for the markets in Egypt and Syria), together with Merca and Barawa also served as transit stops for Swahili merchants from Mombasa and Malindi and for the gold trade from Kilwa. Jewish merchants from the Hormuz also brought their Indian textile and fruit to the Somali coast in exchange for grain and wood.

Duarte Barbosa, the famous Portuguese traveler wrote about Mogadishu (c 1517-1518):

It has a king over it, and is a place of great trade in merchandise. Ships come there from the kingdom of Cambay (India) and from Aden with stuffs of all kinds, and with spices. And they carry away from there much gold, ivory, beeswax, and other things upon which they make a profit. In this town there is plenty of meat, wheat, barley, and horses, and much fruit: it is a very rich place.

In 1542, the Portuguese commander João de Sepúvelda led a small fleet on an expedition to the Somali coast. During this expedition he briefly attacked Mogadishu, capturing an Ottoman ship and firing upon the city, which compelled the sultan of Mogadishu to sign a peace treaty with the Portuguese.

According to the 16th-century explorer, Leo Africanus indicates that the native inhabitants of the Mogadishu polity were of the same origins as the denizens of the northern people of Zeila the capital of Adal Sultanate. They were generally tall with an olive skin complexion, with some being darker. They would wear traditional rich white silk wrapped around their bodies and have Islamic turbans and coastal people would only wear sarongs, and wrote Arabic as a lingua franca. Their weaponry consisted of traditional Somali weapons such as swords, daggers, spears, battle axe, and bows, although they received assistance from its close ally the Ottoman Empire and with the import of firearms such as muskets and cannons. Most were Muslims, although a few adhered to heathen bedouin tradition; there were also a number of Abyssinian Christians further inland. Mogadishu itself was a wealthy, and well-built city-state, which maintained commercial trade with kingdoms across the world. The metropolis city was surrounded by walled stone fortifications.

Ajuran Sultanate collapsed in the 17th century due to heavy taxing against their subjects which opened a rebellion. The ex-subjects became a new wave of Somali immigrants, the Abgaal, moved both into Shabelle basin and into Mogadishu, and the city's mudaffar dynasty collapsed. A new political elite led by Abgaal Yaquub imams, with ties to the new leaders in the interior, moved into Shingaani quarter of the city. Remnants of the Ajuran lived in the other key-quarters Xamarweyne. Ajuran merchants began to look for new linkages and regional trade opportunities since the Abgaal had commandeered the existing trading networks.

== Early modern period (1700s–1900s) ==
=== Hiraab Imamate ===
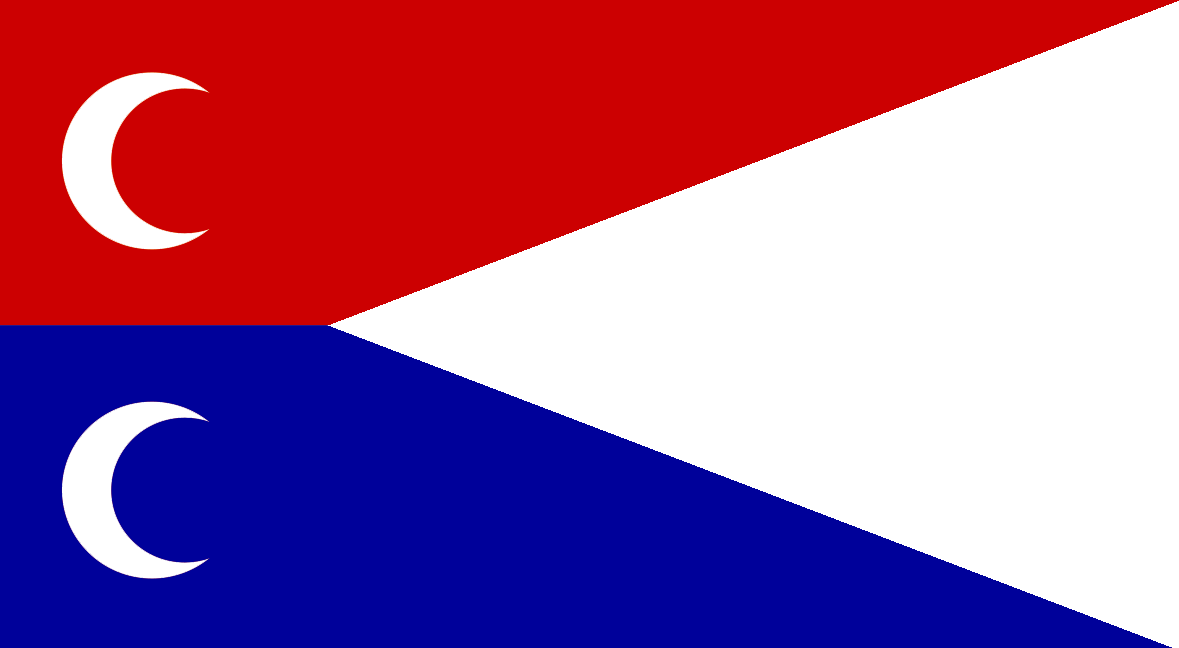
Flag used in Mogadishu, under the Yacquubi, as depicted on a 16th‑century Portuguese map

By the 17th century, the Hiraab Imamate was a powerful kingdom that ruled large parts of southern and central Somalia. It successfully revolted against the Ajuran Sultanate and established an independent rule for at least two centuries from the seventeen hundreds and onwards. The Imamate was governed by the Yacquub Dynasty, originating from the Hiraab sub clan of the Hawiye in Somalia It was founded by Imam Omar.

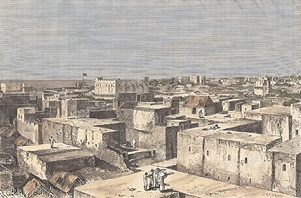
Illustration of Mogadishu in the late 19th century

The alliance involved the army leaders and advisors of the Habar Gidir and Duduble, a Fiqhi/Qadi of Sheekhaal, and the Imam was reserved for the Abgaal who is believed to have been the first born. Once established, the Imamate ruled the territories from the Shabeelle valley, the Benadir province, the Mareeg area all the way to the arid lands of Mudug, which included the ancient port of Hobyo.

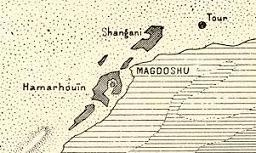
Map of Mogadishu in the 19th century, under the Yacquubi imams, deserting

Hobyo served as a prosperous commercial center for the Imamate while Mogadishu served as the political center where the ruling dynasty resided. The agricultural centres of El Dher and Harardhere included the production of sorghum and beans, supplementing with herds of camels, cattle, goats and sheep. Livestock, hides and skin, whilst the aromatic woods and raisins were the primary exports as rice, other foodstuffs and clothes were imported. Merchants looking for exotic goods came to the Imamate to buy textiles, precious metals and pearls. The commercial goods harvested along the Shabelle river were brought to Mogadishu for trade. Also, the increasing importance and rapid settlement of more southernly cities such as Mogadishu further boosted prosperity, as more and more ships made their way down the Somali coast to trade and replenish their supplies.

By the late 19th century, the Imamate began to decline due to internal problems, between the Yacquub imams, on the coast and hinterland, the Imamate also faced challenges from Imperialist kingdoms, the Zanzibari Sultan from the coast, Geledi Sultanate, and Hobyo Sultanate from the interior from both directions.

==== Geledi Sultanate ====
The Sultanate of Geledi and the Omani Empire vied over who would be the superior power on the Benadir Coast, with Sultan Yusuf Mahamud ultimately being the dominant force with the Omanis having a nominal presence and Said bin Sultan even paying tribute to him in order to keep Omani representatives in Mogadishu. Mogadishu under Abgaal control had been in a period of decline and disarray near the end of the Hiraab Imamate. Following a struggle between the two leading figures of each respective quarter (Shingani and Hamarweyn) Sultan Yusuf marched into the city with an 8,000 strong army and ruled in favour of the Shingani leader, with the loser fleeing the city. Yusuf would nominate a relative of the deposed chief to lead the Hamarweyn quarter ending the dispute. Sultan Yusuf is even referred to as the Governor of Mogadishu in some sources, highlighting the power he exerted over the city.

Despite the Hiraab political decline, trade with Geledi Sultanate flourished during Geledi Sultan Ahmed Yusuf's reign. British explorer John Kirk visited the region in 1873 and noted a variety of things. Roughly 20 large dhows were docked in both Mogadishu and Merka respectively filled with grain produced from the farms of the Geledi in the interior. Kirk met the Hiraab Imam Mahmood who reigned over Mogadishu. The Shabelle river itself was referred to as the 'Geledi river' by Kirk, perhaps in respect of the sheer volume of produce that the Sultanate output. In Barawa there was little grain instead a large quantity of ivory and skins which had already been loaded onto ships destined for Zanzibar.

The Geledi Sultans were at the height of their power. They dominated the East African ivory trade, and also held sway over the Jubba and Shebelle valleys in the hinterland. The Omani Sultans' authority in Mogadishu, however, was largely nominal (existing by name only). When Imam Azzan bin Qais of Oman sought to build a fort in the city, he was thus obligated to request permission from Sultan Ahmed Yusuf the real power broker who in turn convinced the Hiraab Imam to acquiesce to the decision. Omani and later Zanzibari officials were mere representatives of the Sultan to collect customs and needed the fort for their own security rather than control of the city. This Fort of Garessa was eventually constructed in 1870. The Sultan of Zanzibar later leased and then sold the infrastructure that he had built to the Italians, but not the land itself, which was Somali owned.

== Italian Somalia ==
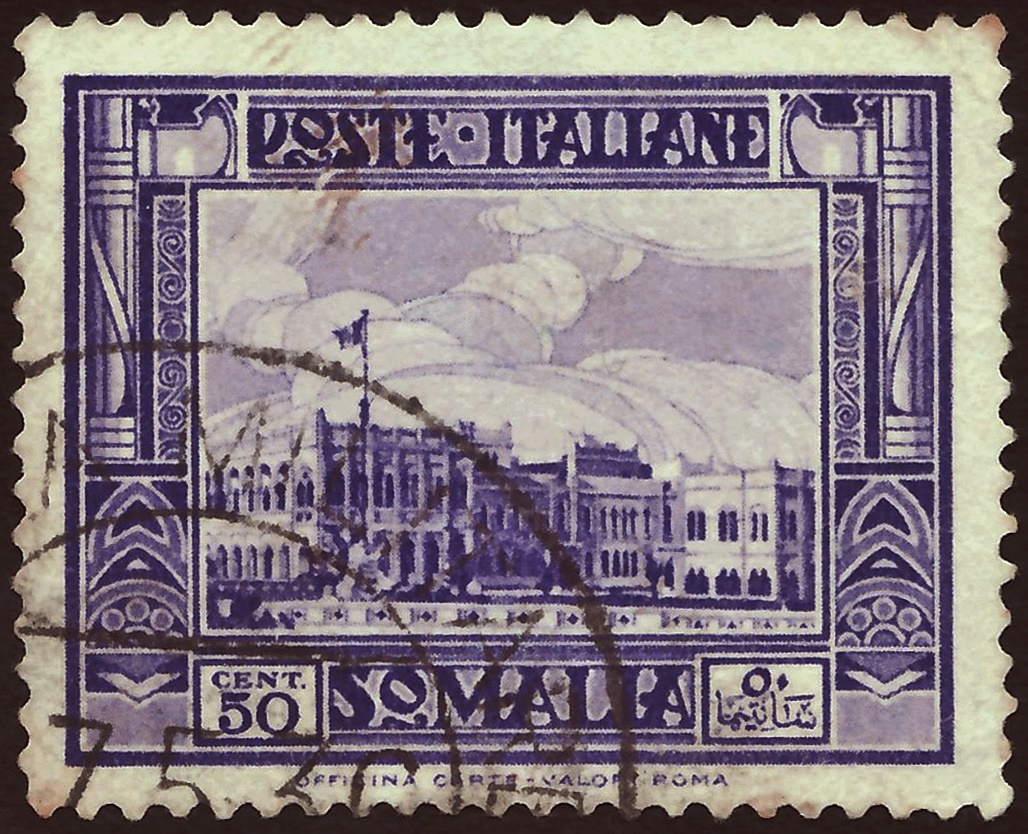
A 1932 stamp showing the Governor's Palace in "Mogadiscio italiana"

In 1892, Osman Ahmed leased the city to Italy. Italy purchased the city in 1905 and made Mogadishu the capital of the newly established Italian Somaliland.

In the early 1930s, the new Italian governors, Guido Corni and Maurizio Rava, started a policy of non-coercive assimilation of locals. Many Mogadishu residents were subsequently enlisted into the Italian colonial troops and thousands of Italian settlers moved to live in the city. Mogadishu also re-assumed its historic position as an important commercial centre, with some small manufacturing companies established within the city limits and in some agricultural areas around the capital, such as Genale and Jowhar (Villaggio duca degli Abruzzi).

Mogadishu underwent a period of infrastructural expansion in the late 1930s, with new buildings and avenues such as the "Arch of Triumph" erected in 1934. In 1936, the city had a population of 50,000 inhabitants of which 20,000 were Italian Somalis. The Italian settlers also connected the city to Jowhar with a 114 km railway and a newly asphalted Imperial Road leading toward to Addis Ababa. In the late 1930s was created the international airport Petrella with a huge enlargement of the port of Mogadishu.

In 1941, British forces invaded and occupied Mogadishu and Italian Somaliland at large as part of the East African Campaign of World War II.

== Somali Youth League ==
Flag of the Somali Youth League (SYL), the nation's first political party.

The Somali Youth League(SYL) formed in 1943 succeeded in uniting all Somali clans under its flag and led the country on the road to independence by drawing inspiration from the early 20th century Somali nationalist; Mohammed Abdullah Hassan and his Dervish Dream, as well as invoking the history of the medieval Somali empires and Kingdoms. The SYL called for national unity and rejected clan divisions. Faced with growing Italian political pressure inimical to continued British tenure and to Somali aspirations for independence, the Somalis and the British came to see each other as allies. The situation prompted British officials to encourage the Somalis to form political parties. In 1945, the Potsdam Conference was held, where it was decided not to return Italian Somaliland to Italy.

Somali nationalist agitation against the possibility of Italian rule reached the level of violent confrontation in 1948, when on 11 January, large riots broke out that left fifty-two Italians (and 14 Somalis pro-Italy) dead in the streets of Mogadishu and other coastal cities in which many more were injured. In Mogadishu, a two-hour battle "with bullets, arrows, broken bottles and knives" ensued during an SYL parade. During those clashes Hawo Tako participated, following the visit of the Four-Power Commission, where she eventually was killed. She later became a symbol for Pan-Somalism, and the nationalist Somali Youth League (SYL), who proclaimed her a martyr. When in 1949 news reached Mogadishu that the UN General Assembly was discussing the possibility of the return of Italian administration, more violent riots broke out in the city. In November 1949, the United Nations opted to grant Italy trusteeship of Italian Somaliland, but only under close supervision and on the condition — first proposed by the SYL and other nascent Somali political organizations that were then agitating for independence — that Somalia should achieve independence within ten years.

== Trust Territory of Somalia (1950–1960) ==
Following the dissolution of the former Italian Somaliland, the new Trust Territory of Somalia was established as a transitional step toward eventual independence. Italy would administer the polity from 1950 to 1960 under a UN mandate.

This period was marked by significant urban and economic development. New post-secondary institutions of law, economics and social studies were also founded. These academies were affiliated with the University of Rome and included the Somali National University.

On 13 April 1956, administration of the territory was transferred in full to the Somali politicians, and a seventy-member legislative assembly was formed with the participation of SYL members (who agreed with the Italians). The first general elections in Somalia under universal suffrage were won by the SYL, whose then-leader, Abdullahi Issa, became prime minister, and Aden Abdulle Osman Daar became speaker of parliament. The new government would go on to implement various economic and social reforms.

British Somaliland became independent on June 26, 1960 as the State of Somaliland, and the Trust Territory of Somalia (the former Italian Somaliland) followed suit five days later. On July 1, 1960, the two territories united to form the Somali Republic, with Mogadishu as the nation's capital.

== Independence ==
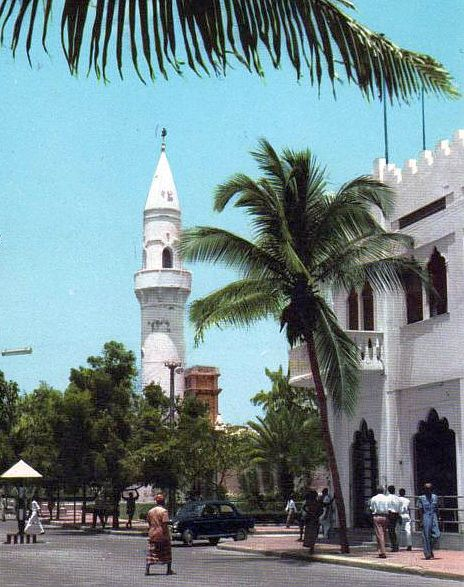
An avenue in Mogadishu, 1963

A government was formed by Abdullahi Issa and other members of the trusteeship and protectorate governments, with Haji Bashir Ismail Yusuf as President of the Somali National Assembly, Aden Abdullah Osman Daar as President of the Somali Republic and Abdirashid Ali Shermarke as Prime Minister (later to become President from 1967–1969). On 20 July 1961 and through a popular referendum, the people of Somalia ratified a new constitution, which was first drafted in 1960. In 1967, Muhammad Haji Ibrahim Egal became Prime Minister, a position to which he was appointed by Shermarke.

In the first national elections after independence, held in Mogadishu on 30 March 1964, the SYL won an absolute majority of 69 of the 123 parliamentary seats. The remaining seats were divided among 11 parties. Five years from then, in general elections held in March 1969, the ruling SYL returned to power. However, on 15 October 1969, while paying a visit to the northern town of Las Anod, Somalia's then President Abdirashid Ali Shermarke was shot dead by one of his own bodyguards. His assassination was quickly followed by a military coup d'état on 21 October 1969 (the day after his funeral), in which the Somali Army seized power without encountering armed opposition — essentially a bloodless takeover. The putsch was spearheaded by Major General Mohamed Siad Barre, who at the time commanded the army.

Alongside Barre, the Supreme Revolutionary Council (SRC) that assumed power after President Sharmarke's assassination was led by Lieutenant Colonel Salaad Gabeyre Kediye and Chief of Police Jama Korshel. Kediye officially held the title of "Father of the Revolution," and Barre shortly afterwards became the head of the SRC. The SRC subsequently renamed the country the Somali Democratic Republic, dissolved the parliament and the Supreme Court, and suspended the constitution.

The revolutionary army established various large-scale public works programs, including the Mogadishu Stadium. In addition to a nationalization program of industry and land, the Mogadishu-based new regime's foreign policy placed an emphasis on Somalia's traditional and religious links with the Arab world, eventually joining the Arab League (AL) in 1974.

After fallout from the unsuccessful Ogaden campaign of the late 1970s, the Barre administration began arresting government and military officials under suspicion of participation in the abortive 1978 coup d'état. Most of the people who had allegedly helped plot the putsch were summarily executed. However, several officials managed to escape abroad and started to form the first of various dissident groups dedicated to ousting Barre's regime by force.

== Somali Civil War ==
=== Collapse of government and UN intervention ===
By the late 1980s, the moral authority of Barre's regime had collapsed. The authorities became increasingly totalitarian, and resistance movements, encouraged by Ethiopia's communist Derg administration, sprang up across the country. This eventually led in 1991 to the outbreak of the civil war, the toppling of Barre's government, and the disbandment of the Somali National Army (SNA). Many of the opposition groups subsequently began competing for influence in the power vacuum that followed the ouster of Barre's regime. Armed factions led by USC commanders General Mohamed Farah Aidid and Ali Mahdi Mohamed, in particular, clashed as each sought to exert authority over the capital.

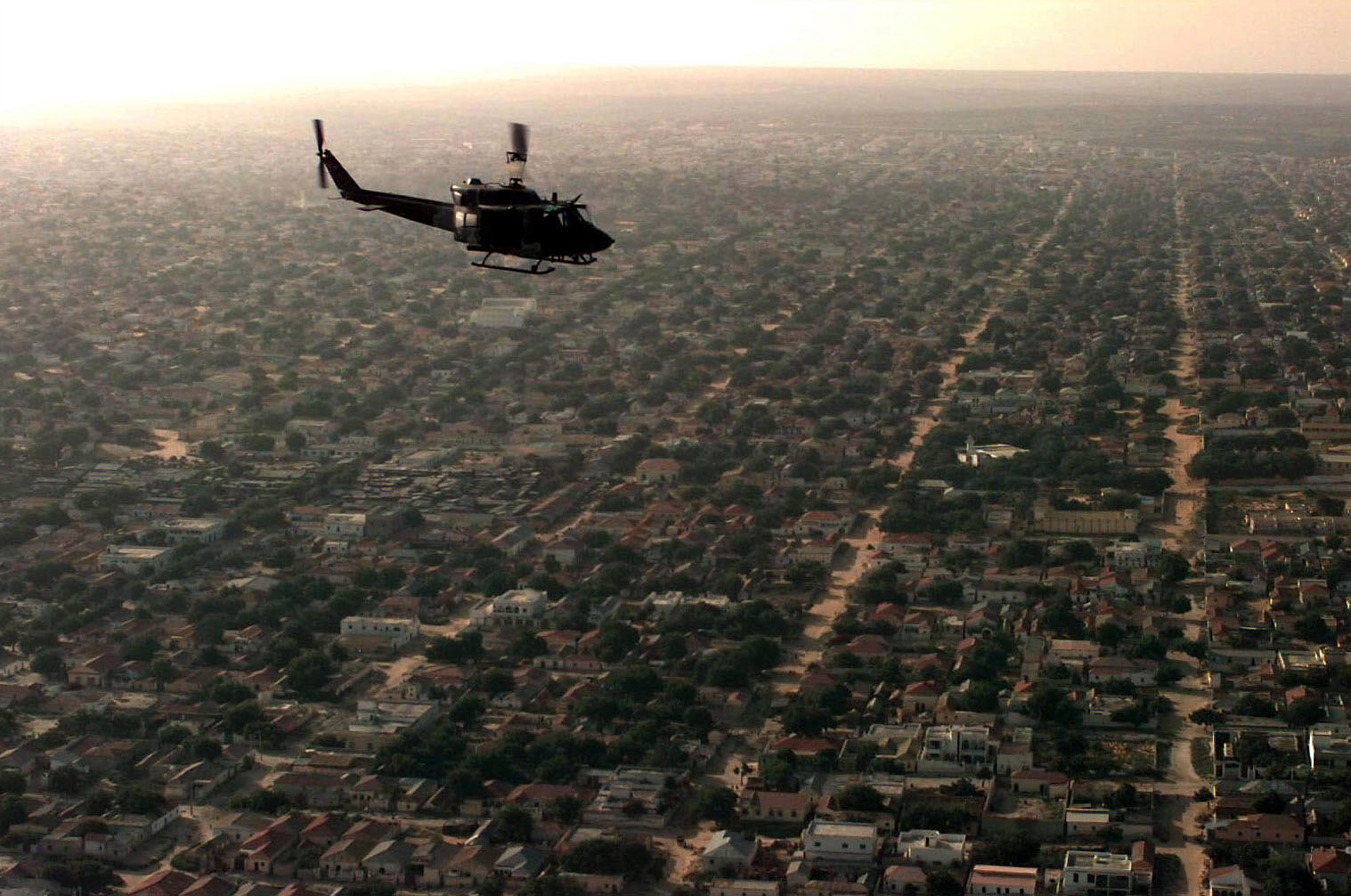
A residential area of Mogadishu, with a U.S. Marine Corps helicopter in the foreground (1992).

UN Security Council Resolution 733 and UN Security Council Resolution 746 led to the creation of UNOSOM I, the first stabilization mission in Somalia after the dissolution of the central government. United Nations Security Council Resolution 794 was unanimously passed on December 3, 1992, which approved a coalition of United Nations peacekeepers led by the United States. Forming the Unified Task Force (UNITAF), the alliance was tasked with assuring security until humanitarian efforts were transferred to the UN. Landing in 1993, the UN peacekeeping coalition started the two-year United Nations Operation in Somalia II (UNOSOM II) primarily in the south.

Some of the militias that were then competing for power interpreted the UN troops' presence as a threat to their hegemony. Consequently, several gun battles took place in Mogadishu between local gunmen and peacekeepers. Among these was the Battle of Mogadishu of 1993, an unsuccessful attempt by US troops to apprehend faction leader Aidid.

With these casualties, United States President Bill Clinton withdrew American forces in 1994. Two factions in Mogadishu reached a peace accord the same year, on January 16. However, fighting continued for control over the city, prompting the eventual withdrawal of the last international peacekeepers by March 3, 1995.

General Aidid later declared himself president in June 1995. By 1996, his forces had captured strategic neighborhoods in Mogadishu and some outlying territory. Following renewed fighting in the city and Hoddur, Aidid ultimately died in July 1996 from gunshot wounds suffered in a street battle.

=== Second Battle of Mogadishu ===
On 7 May 2006, fighting broke out between Islamist militias and an alliance of Somali faction leaders over control of Mogadishu. The opposing forces were the Alliance for the Restoration of Peace and Counter-Terrorism (ARPCT), and militia loyal to the Islamic Court Union (ICU). The conflict began in mid-February 2006 when various warlords formed the ARPCT to challenge the emerging influence of the ICU. It was alleged that the United States had been provided funding for the ARPCT due to concerns that the ICU had ties to al-Qaeda. Most of the combat was concentrated in the Sii-Sii (often written "CC" in English) district in northern Mogadishu with both the Islamist militias and the secular factions leaders fighting for control of Mogadishu. On 5 June 2006, the ICU militia seized the city.

=== Fall of Mogadishu ===
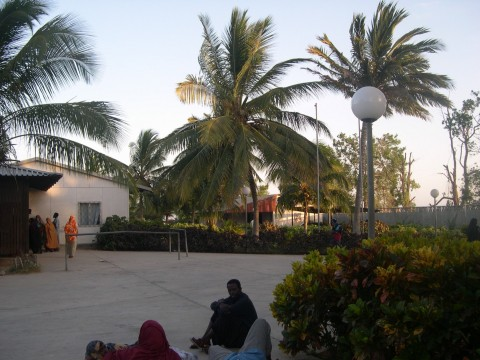
Mogadishu in 2006.

While the ICU consolidated control over Mogadishu, a UN-supported Transitional Government remained undefeated in Baidoa, despite a series of military setbacks. An attempt by the ICU to capture Baidoa prompted a military intervention by Ethiopia in support of the Transitional Government starting December 21, 2006. On December 25, Ethiopian jets bombed Mogadishu's main airport held by the ICU since June. Witnesses reported MiG fighter jets fired missiles into the airport twice. One person was killed and a number injured. Further north, Beledweyne was also bombed, according to witnesses. The fighting between the Ethiopian-backed TFG and the ICU became stretched to over 400 km (250 mi) of land.

Following a rapid advance, Ethiopian and pro-government militias surrounded Mogadishu. A spokesman stated that the troops would besiege the city but not attack it in order to avoid civilian casualties. On December 27, reports stated that the ICU was abandoning the city. On December 28, 2006, pro-government militias claimed to have taken control of key locations, including the former presidential palace.

=== Battle of Mogadishu (2007) ===
In January 2007, an Islamist insurgency erupted in Mogadishu, targeting government and Ethiopian forces. A helicopter was shot down as battles engulf in the city on March 30, 2007. Two Ethiopian helicopters fired on a rebel stronghold before one was hit by a missile. In addition, Ethiopia told its forces had killed 200 insurgents in a two-day joint offensive with Somali troops against the Islamic Courts Union.

=== Al-Shabaab insurgency ===
Following its defeat in the Battle of Ras Kamboni, the Islamic Courts Union splintered into several different factions. Some of the more radical elements, including jihadist group al-Shabaab, regrouped to continue their insurgency against the TFG and oppose the Ethiopian military's presence in Somalia. Throughout 2007 and 2008, Al-Shabaab scored military victories, seizing control of key towns and ports in both central and southern Somalia. At the end of 2008, the group had captured Baidoa but not Mogadishu. By January 2009, al-Shabaab and other militias had managed to force the Ethiopian troops to retreat, leaving behind an under-equipped African Union peacekeeping force to assist the Transitional Federal Government's troops.

Between May 31 and June 9, 2008, representatives of Somalia's federal government and the moderate Alliance for the Re-liberation of Somalia (ARS) group of Islamist rebels participated in peace talks in Djibouti brokered by the UN. The conference ended with a signed agreement calling for the withdrawal of Ethiopian troops in exchange for the cessation of armed confrontation. Parliament was subsequently expanded to 550 seats to accommodate ARS members, which then elected a new president. With the help of a small team of African Union troops, the coalition government also began a counteroffensive in February 2009 to retake control of the southern half of the country. To solidify its control of southern Somalia, the TFG formed an alliance with the Islamic Courts Union, other members of the Alliance for the Re-liberation of Somalia, and Ahlu Sunna Waljama'a, a moderate Sufi militia.

Al-Shabaab have carried out many attacks in Mogadishu, including a suicide truck bombing in 2017 which killed over 500 people.

== Urban renewal ==
In November 2010, a new technocratic government was elected to office, which enacted numerous reforms, especially in the security sector. By August 2011, the new administration and its AMISOM allies had managed to capture all of Mogadishu from the Al-Shabaab militants. Mogadishu has subsequently experienced a period of intense reconstruction and urban renewal spearheaded by the Somali diaspora, the municipal authorities and Turkey, a historic ally of Somalia. As of the 2020s, integrated telecommunication service providers for internet and telephone services based in Mogadishu have linked up their underwater internet cables with that of the adjacent nation of Seychelles. This further buttressed preexisting ties such as trade between Seychelles and Mogadishu, which is the nearest major mainland city to the island nation of Seychelles.
