= Muzaffarids (Somalia) =

16th Century former dynasty

Flag of Mogadishu under the Muẓaffarids, according to Fernão Vaz Dourado's map of 1576

The Muẓaffarids (or Muẓaffar dynasty) were a Muslim dynasty that ruled the Banaadir coast with their capital at Mogadishu from the late 15th or early 16th century until around 1624 or possibly as late as 1700. They were of Persian extraction that mixed with the local Somali population and are related to the Ajuran clan. They were effectively independent, but allied to the more powerful Ajuran Sultanate. They resisted the Portuguese, but occasionally paid them tribute. In the 17th century, the Muẓaffarids were conquered by the Somali Abgaal.

The Muẓaffarid is the second known dynasty of Mogadishu. Its first attested ruler, ʿUmar al-Malik al-Muẓaffar, bore the title of sultan. He is known from his coins. Coins were minted throughout the Muẓaffarid period. The prosperity of Mogadishu during this time stemmed from its status as a trade link between the interior and the sea and its alliance with Ajuran. The city, however, was already in decline when the Muẓaffarids took over.

== Bibliography ==
- Aguiar, Marian (2012). "Mogadishu". In Kwame Anthony Appiah; Henry Louis Gates Jr. (eds.). Dictionary of African Biography. Vol. 2. Oxford University Press. pp. 178–179.
- Chittick, H. Neville (1977). "The East Coast, Madagascar and the Indian Ocean". In Oliver, Roland (ed.). The Cambridge History of Africa, Volume 3: From c.1050 to c.1600. Cambridge University Press. pp. 183–231. ISBN 978-0-521-20981-6. OCLC 59023418.
- Freeman-Grenville, G. S. P. (1963). "Coins from Mogadishu, c. 1300 to c. 1700". The Numismatic Chronicle and Journal of the Royal Numismatic Society, Seventh Series. 3: 179–200. JSTOR 42662497.
- Kassim, Mohamed M. (1995). "Islam and Swahili Culture on the Banadir Coast". Northeast African Studies. New Series. 2 (3): 21–37. doi:10.1353/nas.1995.0009. JSTOR 41931111.
- Mukhtar, M. H. (2016). "Ajuran Sultanate". The Encyclopedia of Empire. Vol. 1. John Wiley & Sons. pp. 1–2. doi:10.1002/9781118455074.wbeoe146. ISBN 978-1-118-44064-3.
