= Ajuran Sultanate =

Muslim sultanate in the Horn of Africa

Ajuuraan Sultanate Dawladdii Ajuuraan (Somali) دولة الأجورانية (Arabic)
- 13th century–1695
- (Mogadishu area) flag according to 1576 Portuguese map

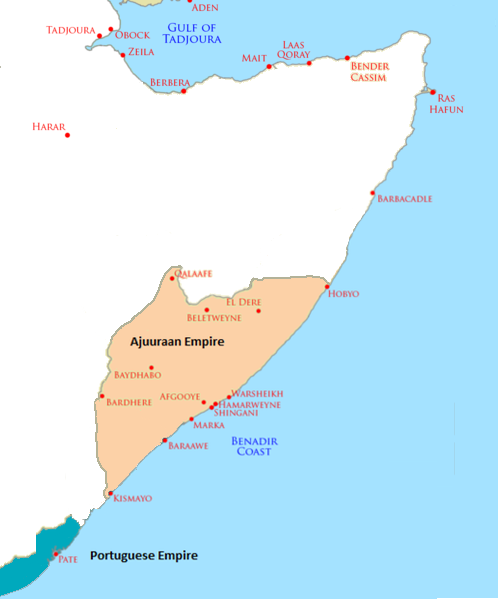
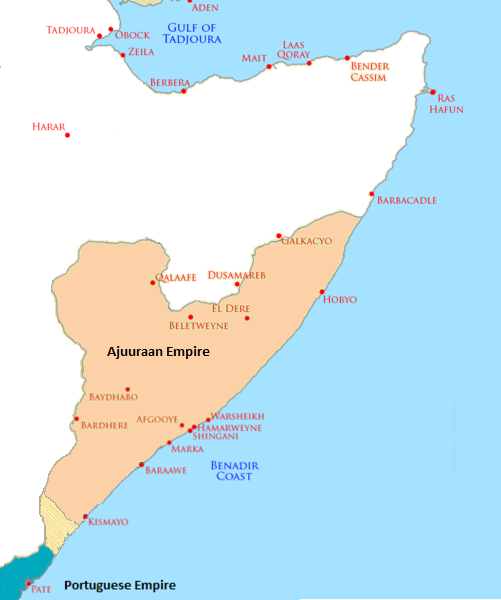
- Capital: Mareeg ^{(initially)}; Qelafo; Merca; Mogadishu
- Common languages: Somali; Arabic
- Religion: Sunni Islam^{(state)}
- Government: Monarchy
- Sultan, Imam
  - 16th century: Rasul ibn Ali
- History
  - Established: 13th century 13th century
  - Ajuran-Portuguese battles: 16th century
  - Oromo invasions: 16th century
  - Disestablished: 1695
- Currency: Ajuran; Mogadishan
Preceded by	Succeeded by
Mogadishu Sultanate; Tunni Sultanate	Geledi Sultanate; Hiraab Imamate
- Today part of: Somalia; Ethiopia

The Ajuran Sultanate (Somali: Saldanadda Ajuuraan, Arabic: سلطنة الأجورانية), natively referred to as Ajuuraan, and often simply Ajuran or Ajur, was a Muslim empire in the Horn of Africa that thrived from the late medieval and early modern period. Founded by Somali Sultans its rise to prominence began during the 13th and 14th centuries and by the 15th century, it was Africa's only 'hydraulic empire'. Through a strong centralized administration and an aggressive military stance towards invaders, the Ajuran Empire successfully resisted Oromo invasions from the west and fought against Portuguese incursions from the east.

The Ajuran were among the great centres of commerce in the contemporary African and Islamic world. Trading routes dating from ancient and early medieval periods of Somali maritime enterprise were strengthened and re-established, foreign trade and commerce in the coastal provinces flourished with ships sailing to and from kingdoms and empires in the Near East, East Asia, and the wider world. The Ajuran are believed to be the first Africans to have contact with China.

== Etymology ==
The Ajuran Empire traces its name back to the Arabic word; إيجار (Ījārā), which means to rent or tax, likely related to the tributes paid to the Empire.

== History ==
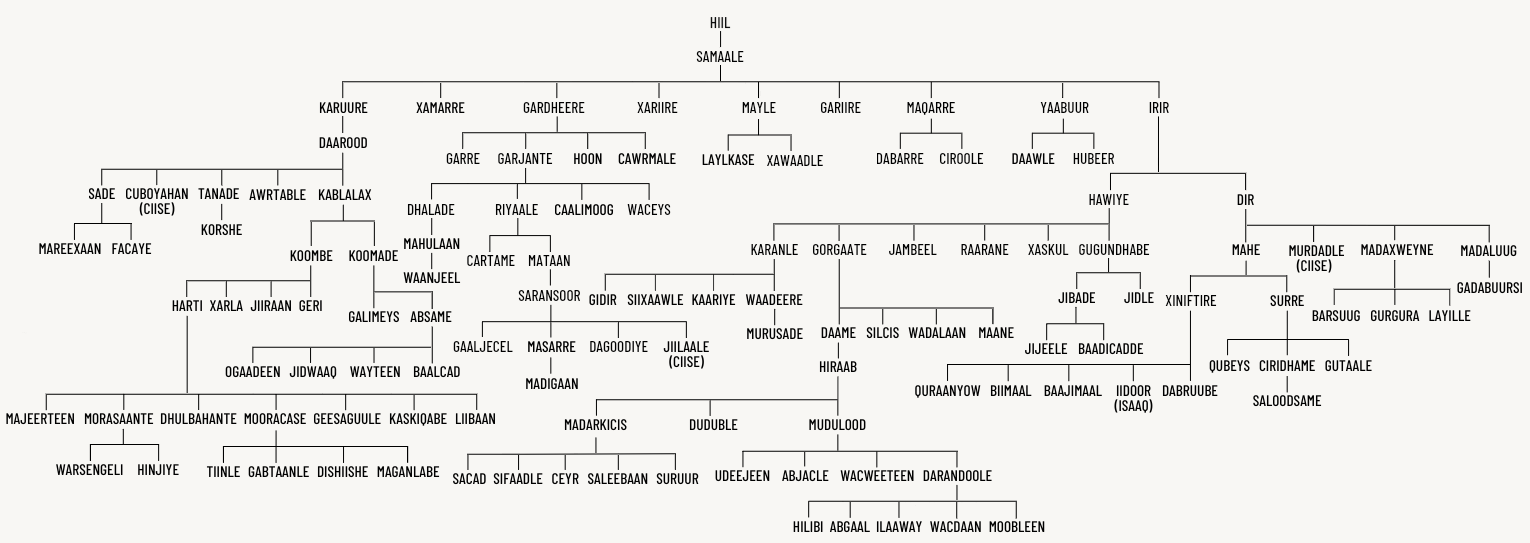
Genealogical tree of Somali clans

The Ajuran is regarded as a successor to its more influential predecessor, the Adal Sultanate. The precise origins of the Ajuran vary as they are rooted in traditional Somali folklore. It was in the 13th century the Ajuran first appeared and began gaining power. For several centuries they exerted strong political influence on the inland pastoralists, while also embracing coastal trade and infrastructure. The sultanate functioned for approximately three centuries.

=== Origins and the House of Garen ===
The House of Gareen
Known members
- Ajuran
- Baydan
- Badbeydan
- Walmuge
- Sanle
- Sanle Mage
- Toore
- Dhaqsoore

The House of Garen was the ruling hereditary dynasty of the Ajuran Empire. Its origin lies in the Garen Kingdom that during the 13th century ruled parts of the Somali Region of Ethiopia. With the migration of Somalis from the northern half of the Horn region southwards, new cultural and religious orders were introduced, influencing the administrative structure of the dynasty.

A system of governance began to evolve into an Islamic government. Through their genealogical Baraka, which came from the saint Balad (who was known to have come from outside the Kingdom).

=== Rise to prominence and dominance ===
The Ajuran gradually became a notable and respected empire. They rose to dominance in the interior of the Banaadir region in the late 1300s, after which they maintained hegemony for approximately three centuries. The introduction of a great variety of technological innovations are attributed to the empire, such as systems of dykes and dams on the Shebelle River, large homes and stone fortifications along with the creation of large stone wells, many of which were still in use well into the 20th century. Notably, the Ajuran were the first to impose a regular system of tribute on the surrounding populations. The empire fielded a powerful army which employed firearms towards the end of its dominant period. As a 'water dynasty', the Ajuran monopolized the Jubba and Shabelle rivers through hydraulic engineering.

Historically, the Sultanate of Mogadishu was confined by the Adal Sultanate in the north. Throughout the Middle Ages, the Ajurans routinely aligned themselves politically with the Adalites. Described as one country by Ibn Battuta, a journey to Mogadishu from the town of Zeila took him eight weeks to complete. The Ajuran Empire's sphere of influence in the Horn of Africa was among the largest in the region. At the height of its reach, the empire covered most of southern Somalia as well as eastern Ethiopia, with its domain at one point extending from Hobyo in the north to Kismayo in the south, and Qelafo in the west. One of the notables during this period was Abu Bakr Muzaffar who was a vassal on the coast at Mogadishu.

=== Ajuran-Portuguese battles ===
The European Age of Discovery brought Europe's then superpower the Portuguese Empire to the coast of East Africa, which enjoyed a flourishing trade with foreign nations. The southeastern city-states of Kilwa, Mombasa, Malindi, Pate and Lamu were all systematically sacked and plundered by the Portuguese. Tristão da Cunha then set his eyes on Ajuran territory, where the Battle of Barawa was fought. After a long period of engagement, the Portuguese soldiers burned the city and looted it. Fierce resistance by the local populace and soldiers resulted in the failure of the Portuguese to permanently occupy the city, and the inhabitants who had fled to the interior eventually returned and rebuilt the city.

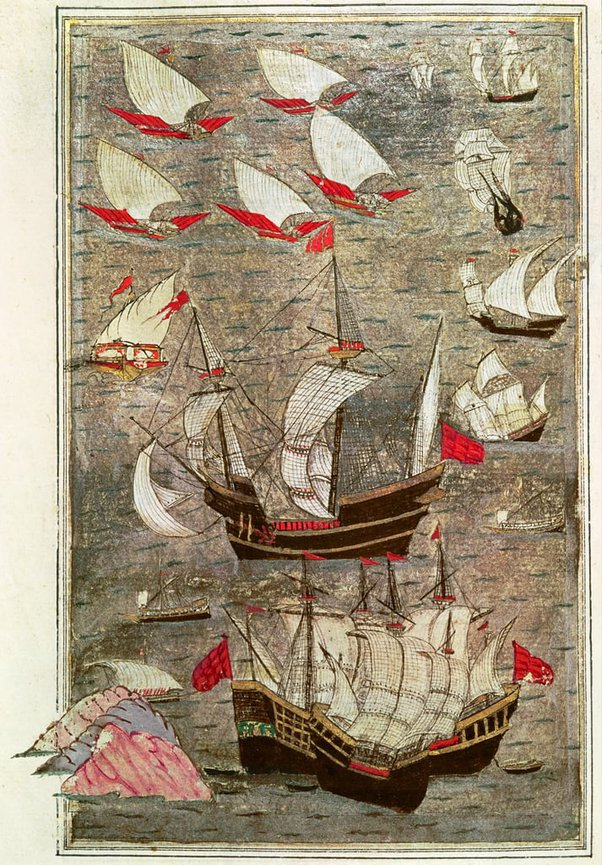
The Ottomans regularly aided the Ajurans in their struggles with the Portuguese in the Indian Ocean.

After Barawa, Tristão set sail for Mogadishu, the richest city on the East African coast. Word had spread of what had happened in Barawa, and a large troop mobilization took place. Many horsemen, soldiers and battleships in defense positions were guarding the city. Nevertheless, Tristão opted to storm and attempt to conquer the city, although every officer and soldier in his army opposed this, fearing certain defeat if they were to engage their opponents in battle. Tristão heeded their advice and sailed for Socotra instead.

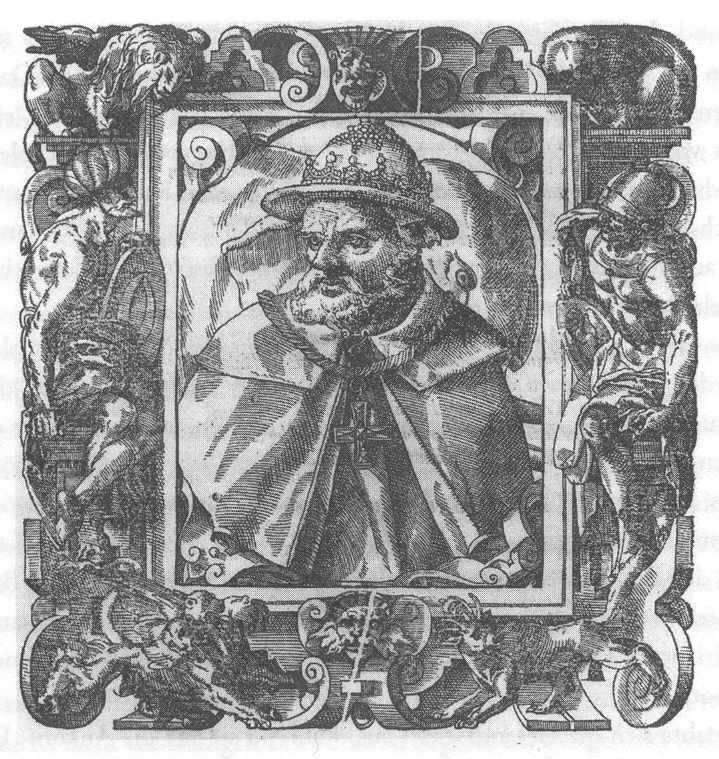
During the Battle of Barawa, Tristão da Cunha was wounded and requested to be knighted by Albuquerque.

Over the next decades tensions remained high and the increased contact between Somali sailors and Ottoman corsairs worried the Portuguese who sent a punitive expedition under João de Sepúlveda, where he bombarded Mogadishu and captured Turkish vessels, compelling its ruler to sign a peace deal with the Portuguese. Barawa would also sign peace with the Portuguese after being sacked. The Ottoman-Somali cooperation against the Portuguese on the Indian Ocean reached a high point in the 1580s when Ajuran clients of the coastal cities began to cooperate with the Arabs and Swahilis under Portuguese rule and sent an envoy to the Turkish corsair Mir Ali Bey for a joint expedition against the Portuguese. He agreed and was joined by a Somali fleet in order to attack the Portuguese colonies in Southeast Africa.

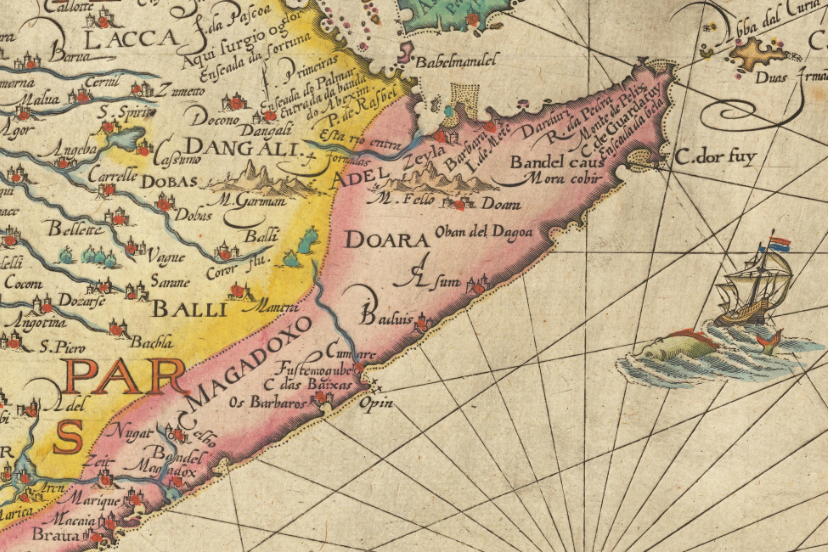
A 16th century map by Jan Huyghen

The Somali-Ottoman offensive managed to drive out the Portuguese from several important cities such as Pate, Mombasa and Kilwa. However, the Portuguese governor sent envoys to Portuguese India requesting a large Portuguese fleet. This request was answered and it reversed the previous offensive of the Muslims into one of defense. The Portuguese armada managed to re-take most of the lost cities and began punishing their leaders, but they refrained from attacking Mogadishu, securing the city's autonomy in the Indian Ocean. The Ottoman Empire would remain an economic partner. Throughout the 16th and 17th centuries the Ajurans successively defied Portuguese hegemony on the Indian Ocean by employing a new coinage which followed the Ottoman pattern, thus proclaiming an attitude of economic independence in regard to the Portuguese.

=== Muslim migrations ===
From the late 15th and up until the 17th centuries saw the arrival of Muslim families from Arabia, Persia, India and Spain to the Ajuran realm of territories, the majority of whom settled in the coastal provinces. Some migrated because of the instability in their respective regions, as was the case with the Hadhrami families from Yemen and Muslims from Spain fleeing the Inquisition. Others came to conduct business or for religious purposes. Due to their strong tradition in religious learning, the new Muslim communities also enjoyed high status among the Somali ruling elite and commoners.

==== Bale ====
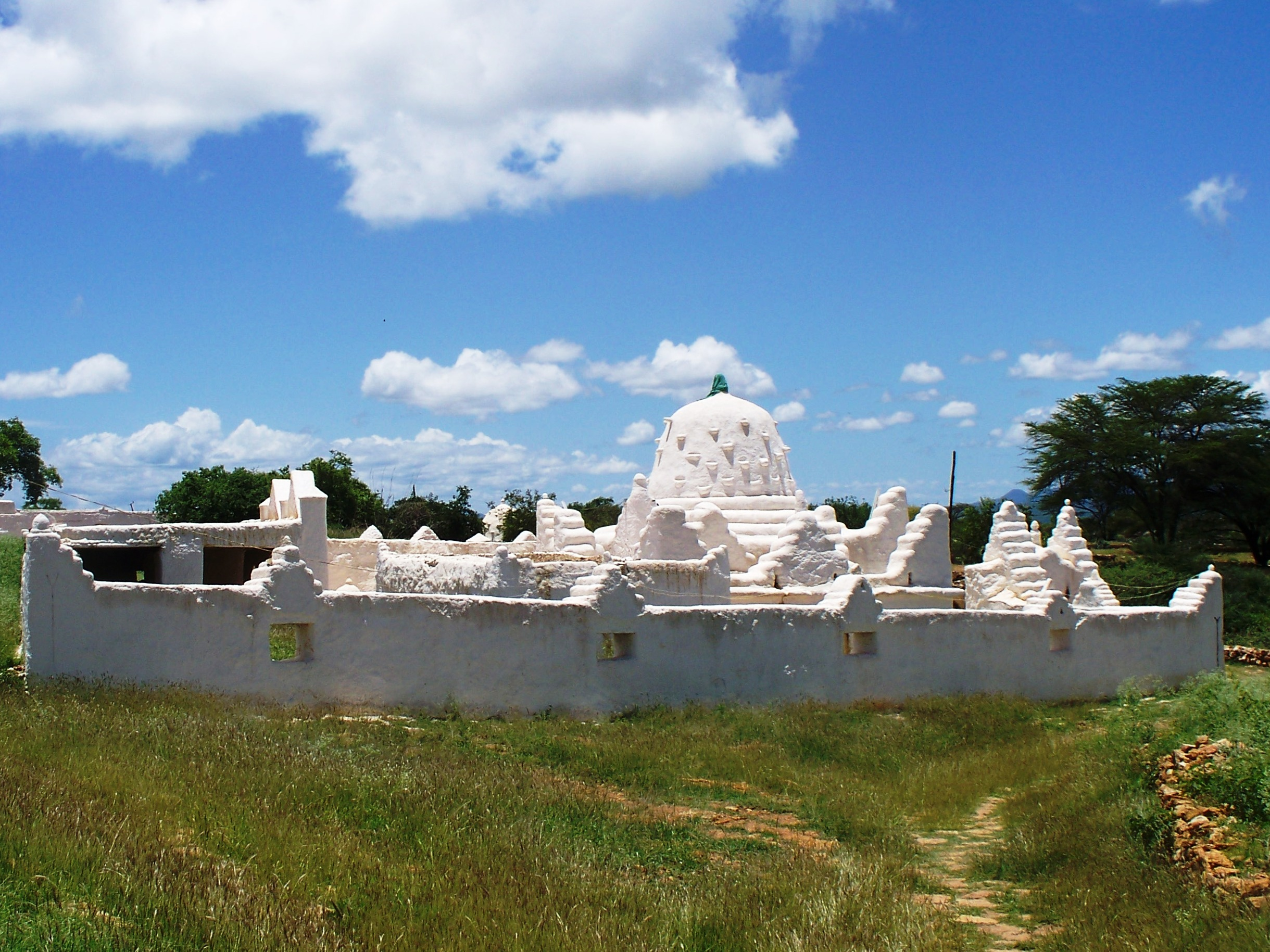
The tomb of Sheikh Hussein

The most famous Somali scholar of Islam from the Ajuraan period is Sheikh Hussein, who was born in Merca, one of the power jurisdiction and cultural centers of the Ajuran Empire. He is credited with converting the Sidamo people living in the area of what is now the Bale Province, Ethiopia to Islam. He is also credited with establishing the Sultanate of Bale.

Despite the Bale Sultanate not being directly under Ajuran rule, the two kingdoms were deeply connected and Bale was heavily influenced by Ajuran. His tomb lies in the town of Sheikh Hussein in what is considered the most sacred place in the country for Ethiopian Muslims, in particular those of Oromo ethnic descent.

=== Gaal Madow Wars ===
In the mid-17th century, the Oromo people collectively began expanding from their homeland towards the southern Somali coast at a time when the Ajurans were at the height of their power. The Garen rulers conducted several military expeditions known as the Gaal Madow Wars, on the Oromo invaders, converting those that were captured to Islam.

=== Fall of Benadir and Southern Somalia ===
The Ajuran Empire slowly declined in power at the end of the 17th century. In this period the rulers of the empire abandoned Sharia, became oppressive and enacted heavy taxation. The dethronement of the Muzaffar clients in Mogadishu and other coastal cities by the Abgaal imam who then established the Hiraab Imamate taking residence in Mogadishu was a significant setback, and the defeat of the Silcis vassals by a former Ajuran general in the interior of the state, Ibrahim Adeer, who established the Gobroon dynasty. By the early 1700s there was effectively no trace of Ajuran left in Banaadir.

Taxation and the practice of primae noctis were the main catalysts for the revolts against Ajuran rulers. The loss of port cities and fertile farms meant that much needed sources of revenue were lost to the rebels. Somali maritime enterprise significantly declined after the collapse of the Ajuran Empire. However, other principalities such as the Isaaq Sultanate, Warsangali Sultanate, Majeerteen Sultanate, and the Sultanate of Hobyo in a way ensured its continuity.

== Administration ==
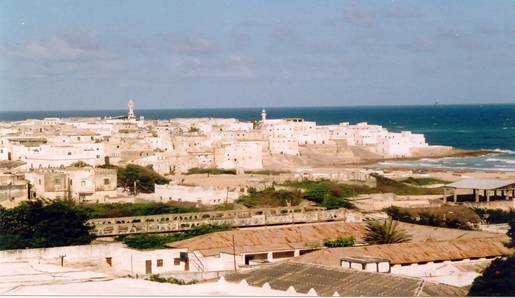
The city of Merca was a prominent administrative center of the Ajurans

The Ajuran nobility used many of the typical Somali aristocratic and court titles, with the Garen rulers styled Imam. These leaders were the empire's highest authority, and counted multiple Sultans, Emirs, and Kings as clients or vassals. The Garen rulers also had seasonal palaces in Mareeg, Qelafo and Merca, important cities in the Empire were Mogadishu and Barawa. The state religion was Islam, and thus law was based on Sharia.

1. Imam – Head of State
2. Emir – Commander of the armed forces and navy
3. Na'ibs – Viceroys
4. Wazirs – Tax and revenue collectors
5. Qadis – Chief Judges

== Citizenry ==
Through their control of the region's wells, the Garen rulers effectively held a monopoly over their nomadic subjects as they were the only hydraulic empire in Africa during their reign. Large wells made out of limestone were constructed throughout the state, which attracted Somali and Oromo nomads with their livestock. The centralized regulations of the wells made it easier for the nomads to settle disputes by taking their queries to government officials who would act as mediators. Long distance caravan trade, a long-time practice in the Horn of Africa, continued unchanged in Ajuran times. Today, numerous ruined and abandoned towns throughout the interior of Somalia and the Horn of Africa are evidence of a once-booming inland trade network dating from the medieval period.

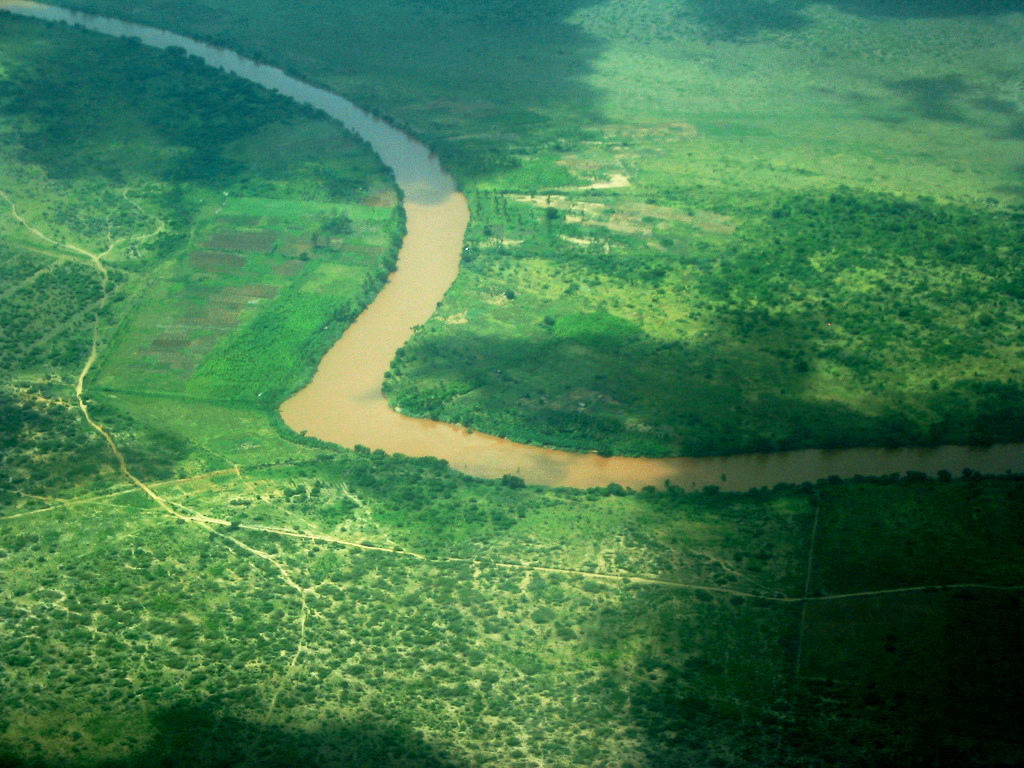
The Jubba River

With the centralized supervision of the Ajuran, farms in Afgooye, Kismayo and other areas in the Jubba and Shabelle valleys increased their productivity. A system of irrigation ditches known locally as Kelliyo fed directly from the Shebelle and Jubba rivers into the plantations where sorghum, maize, beans, grain and cotton were grown during the gu (Spring in Somali) and xagaa (Summer in Somali) seasons of the Somali calendar. This irrigation system was supported by numerous dikes and dams. To determine the average size of a farm, a land measurement system was also invented with moos, taraab and guldeed being the terms used.

== Taxation ==
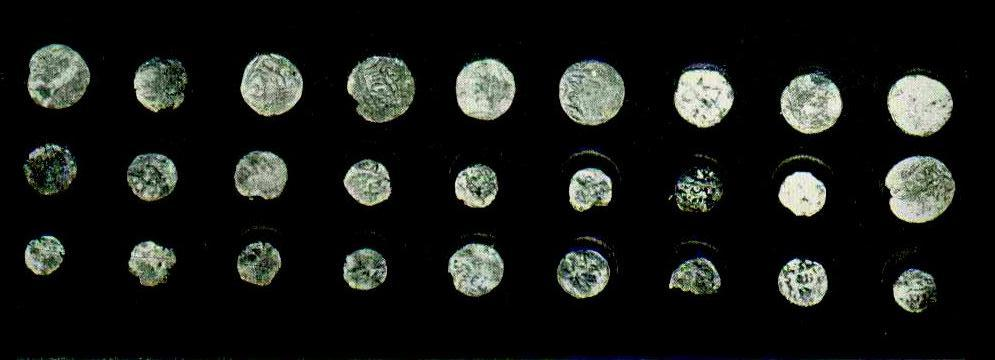
Mogadishan currency

The State collected tribute from the farmers in the form of harvested products like durra, sorghum and bun, and from the nomads, cattle, camels and goats. The collecting of tribute was done by a wazir. Luxury goods imported from foreign lands were also presented as gifts to the Garen rulers by the coastal sultans of the state.

A political device that was implemented by the Garen rulers in their realm was a form of ius primae noctis, which enabled them to create marriages that enforced their hegemonic rule over all the important groups of the empire. The rulers would also claim a large portion of the bride's wealth, which at the time was 100 camels.

For trade, the Ajuran Empire minted its own Ajuran currency. It also utilized the Mogadishan currency originally minted by the Sultanate of Mogadishu, which later became incorporated into the Ajuran Empire. Mogadishan coins have been found as far away as present-day United Arab Emirates in the Middle East.

== Military ==
The Ajuran State had a standing army with which the governors ruled and protected their subjects. The bulk of the army consisted of recruited soldiers who did not have any loyalties to the traditional Somali clan system, thereby making them more reliable. The soldiers were recruited from the inter-riverine area; other recruits came from the surrounding nomadic region. Arab, Persian and Turkish mercenaries were at times employed as well.

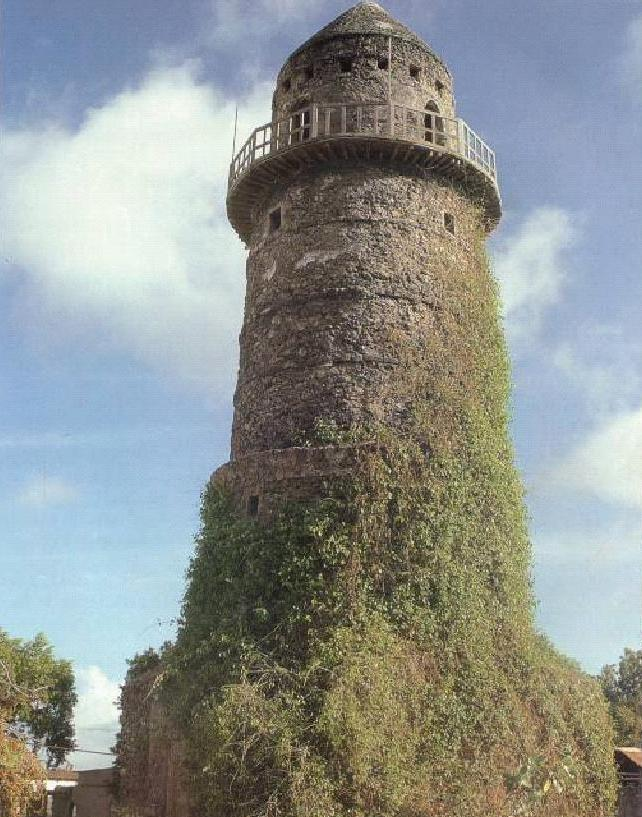
Almnara Somalia defensive tower

In the early period, the army's weapons consisted of traditional Somali weapons such as swords, daggers, spears, battle axes, and bows. The Empire received assistance from the Ottoman Empire, and with the import of firearms through the Muzzaffar port of Mogadishu, the army began acquiring muskets and cannons.

The Ottomans would also remain a key ally during the Ajuran-Portuguese wars. Horses used for military purposes were raised in the interior, and numerous stone fortifications were erected to provide shelter for the army in the coastal districts. In each province, the soldiers were under the supervision of a military commander known as an Emir. The coastal areas and the lucrative Indian Ocean trade was protected by a navy.

== Urban and maritime centers ==
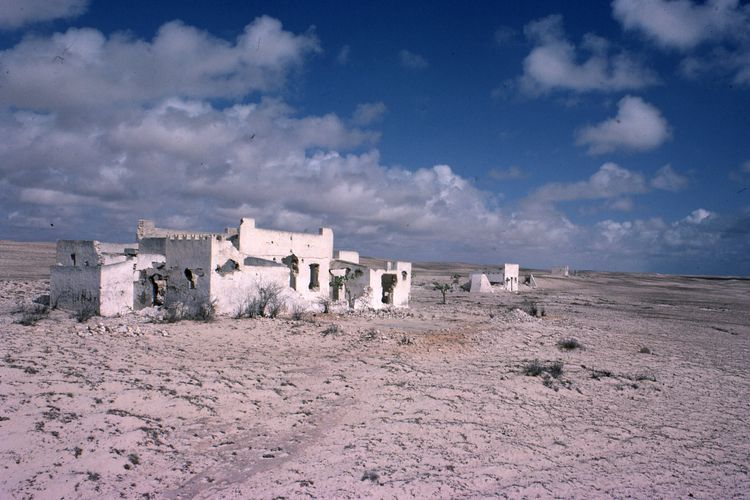
Ruins of Mareeg, capital of the Ajuran Empire, photographed by Neville Chittick in 1975.

The urban centers of Merca, Mogadishu, Barawa, and their respective ports became profitable trade outlets for commodities originating from the interior of the state. The farming communities of the hinterland brought their products to the coastal cities, where they were sold to local merchants who maintained foreign commerce with ships sailing to and from Arabia, India, Venice, Persia, Egypt, Portugal, and as far as China.

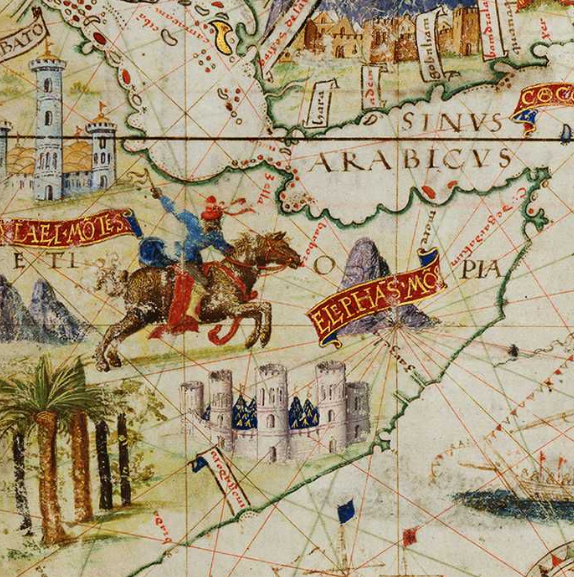
The walled city of Mogadishu on the 16th century Miller Atlas.

Vasco da Gama, who passed by Mogadishu in the 15th century noted that it was a large city with houses of four or five storeys high and big palaces in its centre and many mosques with cylindrical minarets. In the 16th century, Duarte Barbosa noted that many ships from the Kingdom of Cambaya sailed to Mogadishu with cloths and spices for which they in return received gold, wax and ivory. Barbosa also highlighted the abundance of meat, wheat, barley, horses, and fruit on the coastal markets, which generated enormous wealth for the merchants.

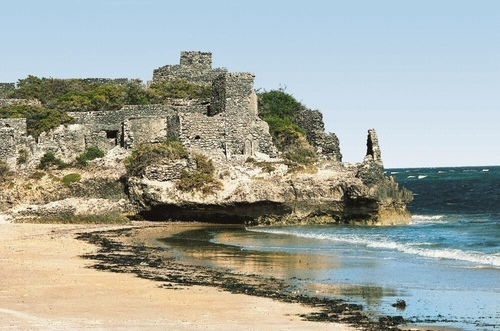
Citadel ruins of Gondershe

Mogadishu, the center of a thriving weaving industry known as toob benadir (specialized for the markets in Egypt and Syria), together with Merca and Barawa also served as transit stops for Swahili merchants from Mombasa and Malindi and for the gold trade from Kilwa. There were Jewish merchants from the Hormuz who brought their Indian textile and fruits to the Somali coast in exchange for grain and wood.

Trading relations were established with Malacca in the 15th century, with cloth, ambergris and porcelain being the main commodities of the trade. In addition, giraffes, zebras and incense were exported to the Ming Empire of China. Hindu merchants from Surat and Southeast African merchants from Pate seeking to bypass both the Portuguese blockade and Omani interference used the ports of Merca and Barawa (which were out of the two powers' jurisdiction) to conduct their trade in safety.

=== Major cities ===
The Ajuran Empire was an influential Somali kingdom that held sway over several cities and towns in central and southern Somalia during the Middle Ages. With the fall of the Sultanate, a number of these settlements continued to prosper, eventually becoming major cities in present-day Somalia. A few were abandoned or destroyed:

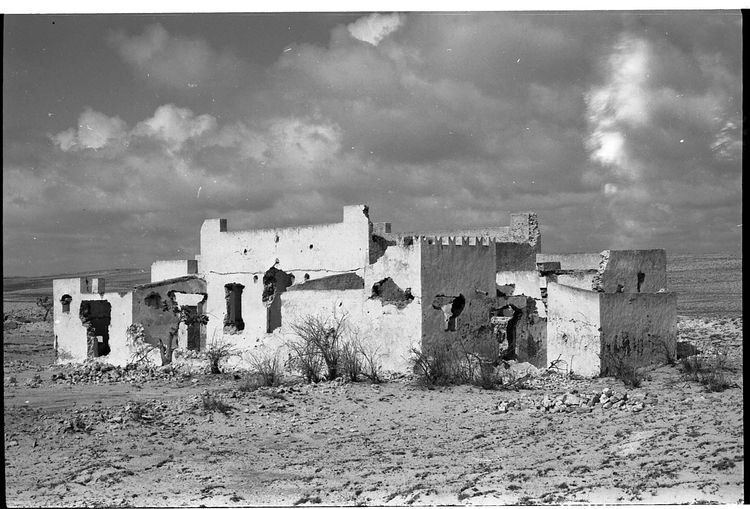
Remains of abounded Caravanserai at Mareeg, central Somalia.

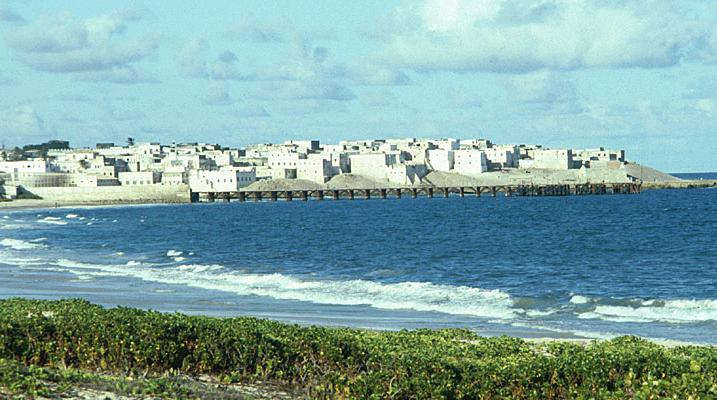
Medieval city of Barawa

==== Capital ====
- Mareeg (initially) (town in the Galguduud region of Somalia)
- Qelafo (town in the Somali Region of Ethiopia)
- Merca (port city in the Lower Shebelle region of Somalia)
- Mogadishu (harbor city and current capital of Somalia)

==== Port cities ====
- Hobyo (harbor city in the Mudug region of Somalia)
- Eyl (port town in the Nugal region of Somalia)
- El Buur (town in the Galgaduud region of Somalia)
- Kismayo (port city in the Lower Juba region of Somalia)
- Barawa (port town in the Lower Shebelle region of Somalia)
- Warsheikh (port town in the Middle Shebelle region of Somalia)

==== Other cities ====
- Afgooye (town in the Lower Shebelle region of Somalia)
- Baidoa (a city in the Bay region of Somalia)
- Gondershe (abandoned, but now a popular tourist attraction site)
- Hannassa (abandoned)
- Ras Bar Balla (abandoned)

== Economy ==
The Ajuran Empire relied on agriculture and trade for most of its income. Major agricultural towns were located on the Shebelle and Jubba rivers, including Kismayo and Afgooye. Situated at the junction of some of the busiest medieval trade routes, the Ajuran and its clients were active participants in the East African gold trade, the Silk Road commerce, trade in the Indian Ocean, and commercial enterprise as far as East Asia.

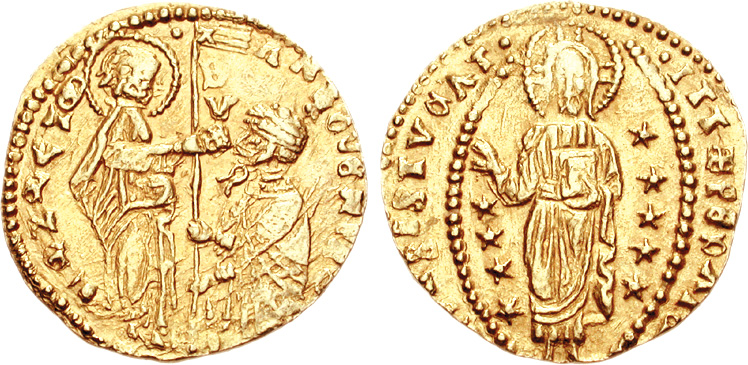
Mogadishu imported valuable gold Sequin coins from the Venetian Empire in Europe.

The Ajuran Empire also minted its own Ajuran currency. Many medieval bronze coins inscribed with the names of Ajuran Sultans have been found in the coastal Benadir province, in addition to pieces from Muslim rulers of Southern Arabia and Persia.

Through the use of commercial vessels, compasses, multiple port cities, light houses and other technology, the merchants of the Ajuran Empire did brisk business with traders from the following states:

Trading countries		Imports	Exports
Country name	Continent/Region	Imports	Exports
Ming Empire	Asia	celadon wares and their currency	horses, exotic animals, and ivory
Mughal Empire	Asia	cloth and spices	gold, wax and wood
Malacca Sultanate	Asia	ambergris and porcelain	cloth and gold
Maldive Islands	Asia	cowries	musk and sheep
Kingdom of Jaffna	Asia	cinnamon and their currency	cloth
Ottoman Empire	Near East	muskets and cannons	textiles
Safavid Persia	Near East	textiles and fruit	grain and wood
Omani Empire	Near East	textiles and spices	frankincense and gold
Portuguese Empire	Europe	gold	cloth
Venetian Empire	Europe	sequins	–
Dutch Empire	Europe	–	–
Mamluk Sultanate	Africa	–	cloth
Adal Sultanate	Africa	–	–
Ethiopian Empire	Africa	–	–
Mali Empire	Africa	–	–
Monomopata	Africa	gold and ivory	spices and cloth
Sultanate of Morocco	Africa	gold and cattle	cloth
Merina Kingdom	Africa	–	

== Diplomacy ==
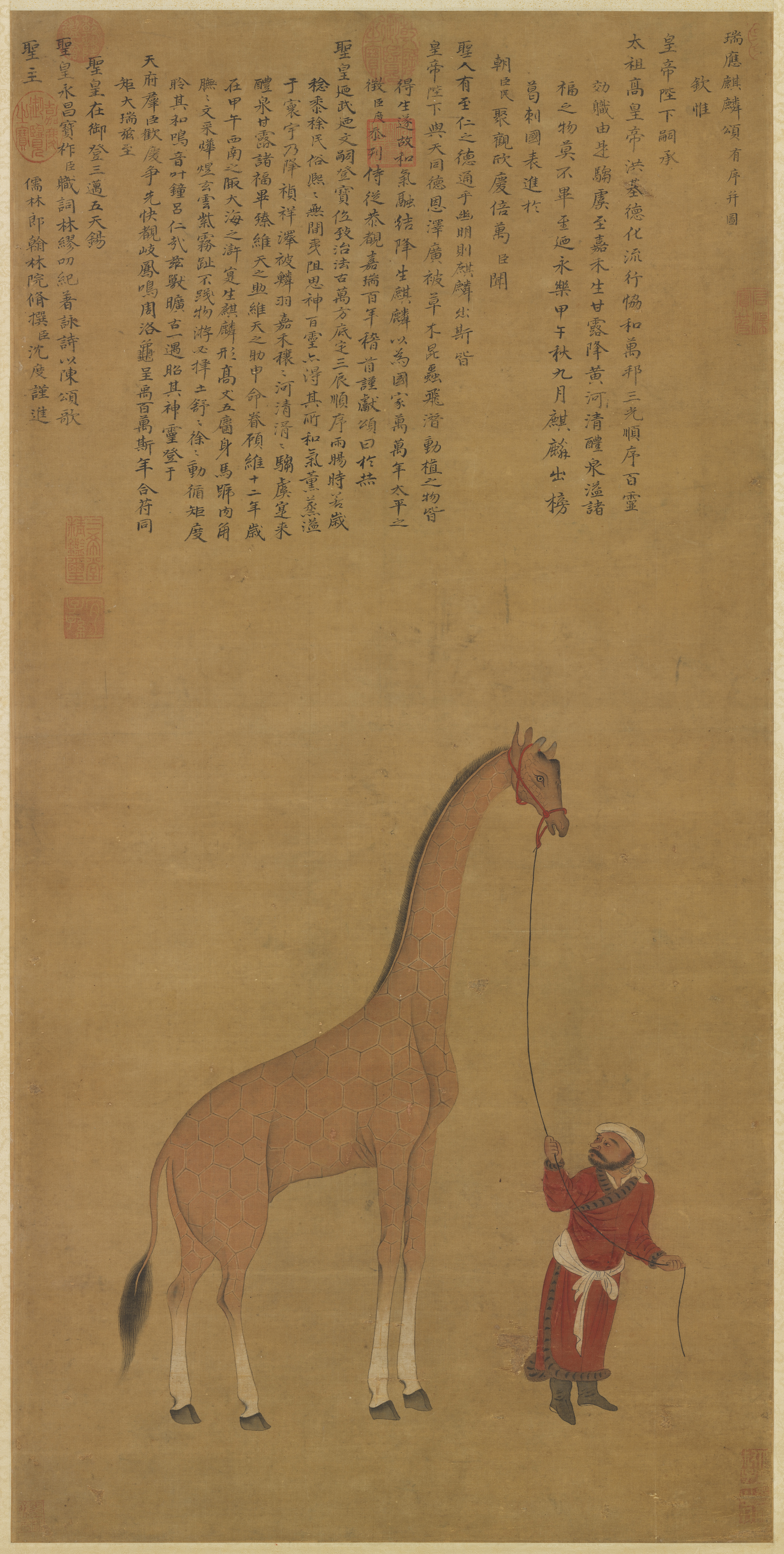
The Ajuran Empire maintained commercial ties with the Ming dynasty

With their maritime pursuits, the Ajuran Empire established trading and diplomatic ties across the old world, especially in Asia, from being close allies of the grand power of the Ottomans to having cordial ties with the mighty Ming Dynasty, paving the way for merchants from Ajuran to embark on great maritime expeditions, as far away as Java and Vietnam.

The ruler of the Ajuran Empire sent ambassadors to China to establish diplomatic ties, creating the first ever recorded African community in China and the most notable Somali ambassador in medieval China was Sa'id of Mogadishu who was the first African man to set foot in China in medieval history. In return, Emperor Yongle, the third emperor of the Ming Dynasty (1368–1644), dispatched one of the largest fleets in history to trade with the Somali nation. The fleet, under the leadership of the famed Hui Muslim Zheng He, arrived at Mogadishu while the city was at its peak in economic and social vibrancy. Along with gold, frankincense and fabrics, Zheng brought back the first ever African wildlife to China, which included hippopotamus, giraffes and gazelles.

== Culture ==
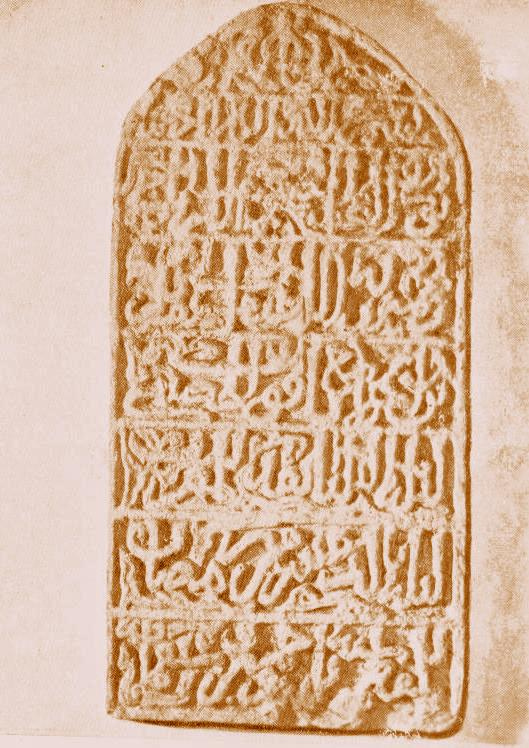
14th century Somali-Arabo stone tablet

The Ajurans developed a very rich culture combining various forms of Somali culture with Islamic architecture, astronomy, and art. Society evolved and flourished during this period. The majority of the inhabitants were ethnic Somali but there were also Yemeni, Persian, and Turkish minorities. The vast majority of the population adhered to Sunni Islam with a Shia minority. The Somali language was the most commonly spoken language while Arabic was prominently used for commercial and religious purposes.

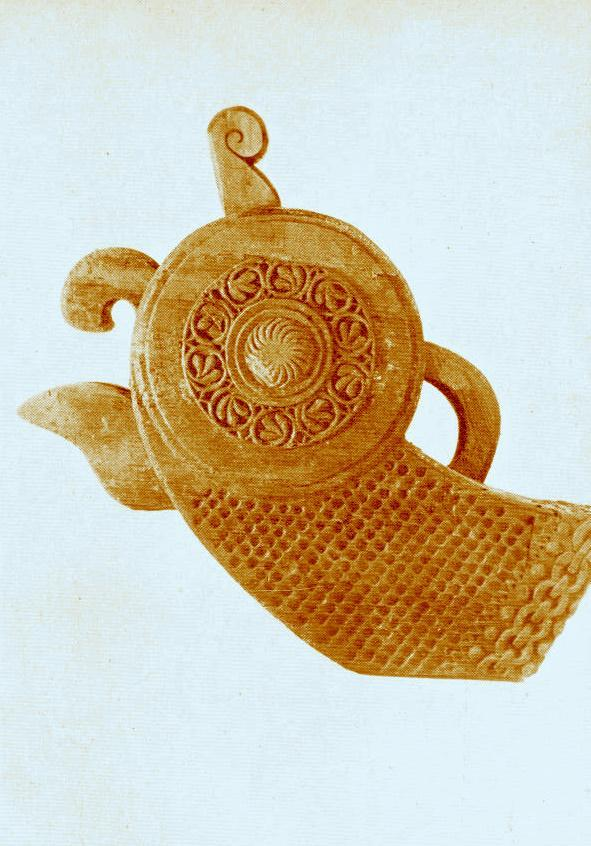
A historic Somali figurehead from Mogadishu

The traditional martial art Istunka, also known as Dabshid, was born during the reign of Ajuran. An annual tournament is still held every year for it in Afgooye. Carving, known in Somali as Qoris, was practiced in the coastal cities of the state. Many wealthy urbanites in the medieval period regularly employed the finest wood and marble carvers in Somalia to work on their interiors and houses. The carvings on the mihrabs and pillars of ancient Somali mosques are some of the oldest on the continent, with Masjid Fakhr al-Din being one of the oldest mosques in Africa.

Artistic carving was considered the craft of men similar to how the Somali textile industry was mainly a women's business. Amongst the nomads, carving, especially woodwork, was widespread and could be found on the most basic objects such as spoons, combs and bowls, but it also included more complex structures such as the portable nomadic tent, the aqal.

In the Merca area, various pillar tombs still exist, which local tradition holds were built in the 16th century, when the Ajuran Empire's naa'ibs governed the district.

== Legacy ==
The empire left an extensive architectural legacy, being one of the major medieval Somali powers engaged in castle and fortress building. Many of the ruined fortifications dotting the landscapes of southern Somalia today are attributed to the Ajuran Empire's engineers, including a number of the pillar tomb fields, necropolises and ruined cities built in that era. During the Ajuran period, many regions and people in the southern part of the Horn of Africa converted to Islam because of the theocratic nature of the government. The royal family, the House of Garen, expanded its territories and established its hegemonic rule through a skillful combination of warfare, trade linkages and alliances.

In the fifteenth century, for example, the Ajuran Empire was the only hydraulic empire in Africa at the time. As a water dynasty, the Ajuran state monopolized the water resources of the Shebelle and Jubba rivers. Through hydraulic engineering, it constructed many of the limestone wells and cisterns of the state that remain in use til today. The rulers developed new systems for agriculture and taxation, which continued to be used in parts of the Horn of Africa as late as the 19th century. The rule of the later Ajuran rulers caused multiple rebellions to break out within the empire, and at the end of the 17th century, Ajuran disintegrated into several successor states, the most notable being the Geledi Sultanate.

== See also ==
- History of Somalia
- List of Muslim states and dynasties
- List of Sunni dynasties
