= Rasul ibn 'Ali =

Rasul ibn 'Ali ارُسُل عَلِيّ

Sultan of the Ajuran Sultanate
- Reign: 16th century
- Religion: Islam

Sultan Rasul ibn 'Ali (Somali: Rasuul ibn Cali,) was a Somali ruler of Ajuran.

== Biography ==
A coinage system dubbed Mogadishu currency has the names of Mogadishu and Ajuran sultans engraved on them. It lists the two predecessors of Sultan Rasul ibn Ali as being Sultan bin Sa'id and Sultan Muhammad, whilst his two successors were Yusuf bin Abu Bakar and Malik ibn Sa'id. His reign was marred by the 16th century Somali-Portuguese wars that were raging across the Horn of Africa during this century, as such, Sultan Rasul has been associated as a defender of southern Somalia against Portuguese military incursions and as a forerunner of Somali nationalism. The Royal Numismatic Society of Great Britain confirmed that the sultans associated with Rasul's successorship had the title Sultan. According to the University of California, Sultan Rasul reigned during the 15th and 16th centuries.

Preceded by Sultan Muhammad	Ajuran sultanate	Succeeded by Yusuf Abu Bakar

== See also ==
- Somali aristocratic and court titles
