= Abd al-Aziz al-Maqdishawi =

Abd al-Aziz al-Maqdishawi عبد العزيز المقديشاوي

Chief of Kinolhas
- Reign: 14th century
- Religion: Islam

Abd al-Aziz al-Maqdishawi (Arabic: عبد العزيز المقديشاوي) was a 14th-century island chief of Kinolhas island of Maldives during the reign of Queen Sultana Khadija.

== Descent or Ancestry ==
According to Purnima Mehta Bhatt, the term Maqdishawi originates from “Mogadishu”. His name Abd al-Aziz al-Maqdishawi suggests a clear connection with the Somali coastal city of Mogadishu and a Somali ethnic origin.

== Biography ==
Abd al-Aziz al-Maqdishawi was an island chief of Kinolhas island during the reign of Queen Sultana Khadija.

When Ibn Battuta's first arrived to the Maldives in 1344, he stayed in Kinolhas for 10 days at the house of a man named Muhammad of Dhofar (Zafr-ul-humuz). It is not known who held the post of island chief of Kinolhas during his first stay.

In 1346, Ibn Battuta returned to the Maldives to fetch his son who was born two years earlier when he was the Chief Judge. After 10 days of voyage, he reached the islands of Maldives and disembarked on the island of Kinolhas. Abd al-Aziz, who was the warden of this island welcomed him warmly with great honor and made him a guest at his home. He then fitted him a boat to continue his journey to the Male. His next stop before Male was on the island of Halali (Hulhulé Island) where he met Muhammad the orator, the Sultana's half-sister, her spouse and her mother who was also one of Ibn Battuta's former wife.

== See also ==
- Ibn Battuta
- Khadijah of the Maldives
- Culture of Somalia
- Sultanate of Mogadishu
- Demographics of Somalia
