= Somali calendar =

Solar calendar traditionally used by Somalis

The Somali calendar, (Somali: Soomaali tiro ammin)، (سومَلي تِرو امّين) which is a moon-and-sun-based system, was used by Somali herders and farmers to determine the seasons and predict the weather. The Somali lunar calendar is known as dayax-tiriska (دَيَح تِرِسكَه) and the sun-based calendar is called amin-tiris (اَمين تِرِس) or shin-tiris (شِن تِرِس).

Indigenous Week of Rendille
The first day of the week	Hahat (هَهَت)
The second day of the week	Orra hakhan (اُورَّه هَخَن)
The third day of the week	Sere (سِرِه)
The fourth day of the week	Kumat (كُمَت)
The fifth day of the week	Sere hakhan (سِرِه هَخَن)
The sixth day of the week	Sere adhi ( the day of sheep and goats ) (سِرِه اَطي)
The seventh day of the week	Sere gaal (the day of camel) (سِرِه غَال)

The Months and Seasons of the Somali Calendar
Seasons	Months	Days	1st day of the month	Gregorian date
Xagaa حَغَا) , 13 weeks	Habis/Karan هَبِس/كَرَن)	30	Habis/Karan 1	July 20
Xagaa حَغَا) , 13 weeks	Hala-lood/Habar-ari ( هَبَر اَري/هَلَه لود	30	Hala-loodHabar-ari 1	August 20
Xagaa حَغَا) , 13 weeks	Diraacgood (دِرَاعغود	30	Diraacgood 1	September 19
Dayr, 13 weeks	Dayrweyn/Dambesame (دَير وِين/ دَمبِسَمبِه)	31	Dayrweyn/Dambesame 1	October, 19
Dayr, 13 weeks	Xoomir/Ximir (حومِر/حِمِر)	30	Xoomir/Ximir 1	November 19
Dayr, 13 weeks	Xays (حَيس)	31	Xays 1	December 19
Diraac, 13 weeks	Aminla'/Lixkor (اَمين لهً/لِحكور	31	Aminla'/Lixkor 1	January 18
Diraac, 13 weeks	Adhi-caseeye (اَطي عَسِيَه)	30	Adhi-caseeye 1	February 18
Diraac, 13 weeks	Daydo (دَيدو)	30	Daydo 1	March 20
Gu’, 13 weeks + 1	Fushade/Seer-ma-waydo (فُشَدِه/سِير مَه وَيدو)	31	Fushade/Seer-ma-waydo 1	April 19
Gu’, 13 weeks + 1	Cawl/Gu’soore (عَول/غُه سوره)	30	Cawl/Gu'soore 1	May 20
Gu’, 13 weeks + 1	Dirir-Sagaalo (دِرِر سَغَالو)	31	Dirir-sagaalo 1	June 19
