= Sultanate of Mogadishu =

Medieval Somali sultanate

Sultanate of Mogadishu Saldanadda Muqdisho (Somali) سلطنة مقديشو (Arabic)
- 10th century–16th century
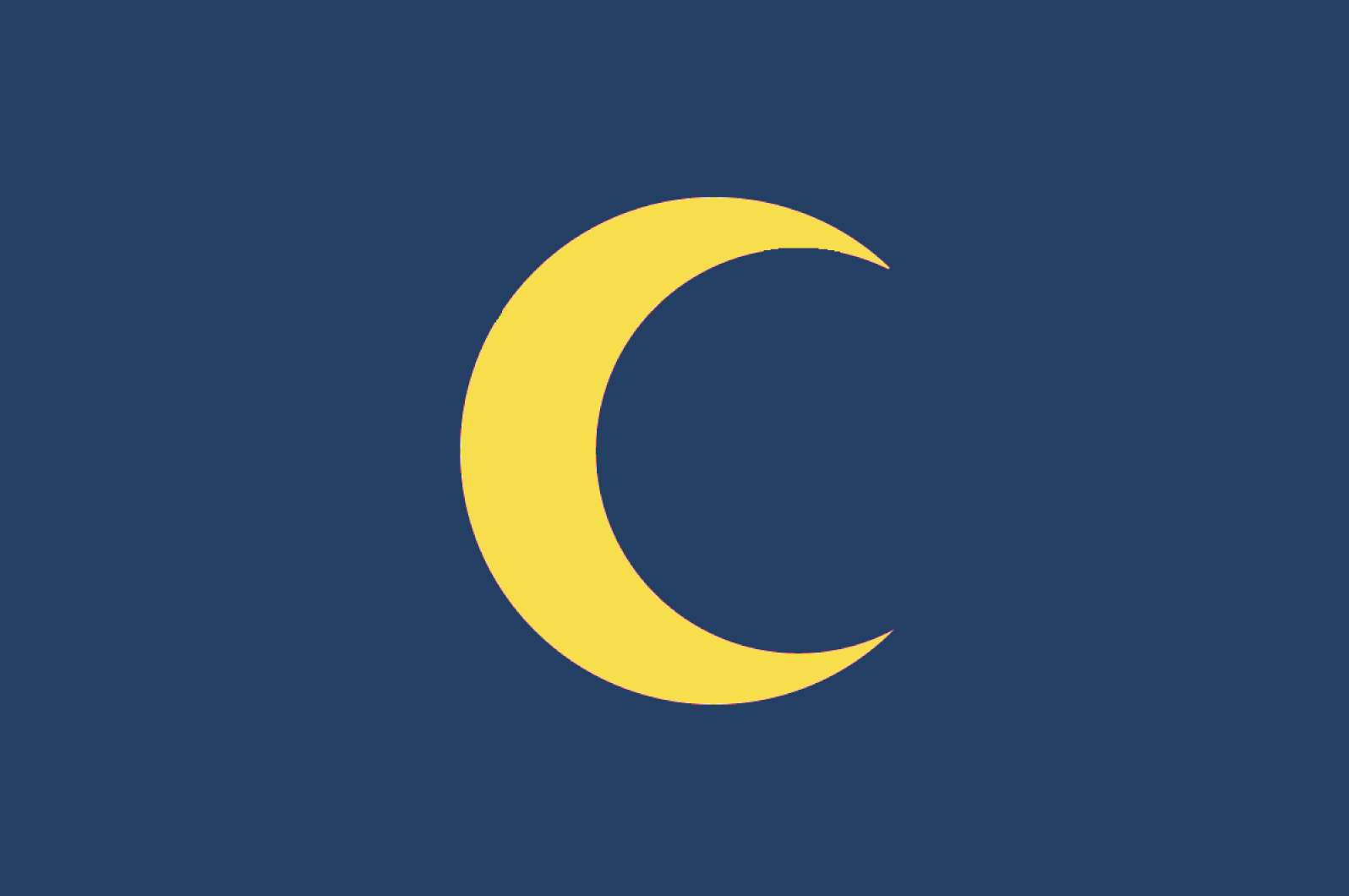
- Flag shown next to the Mogadishu area on Lázaro Luis' 1563 map

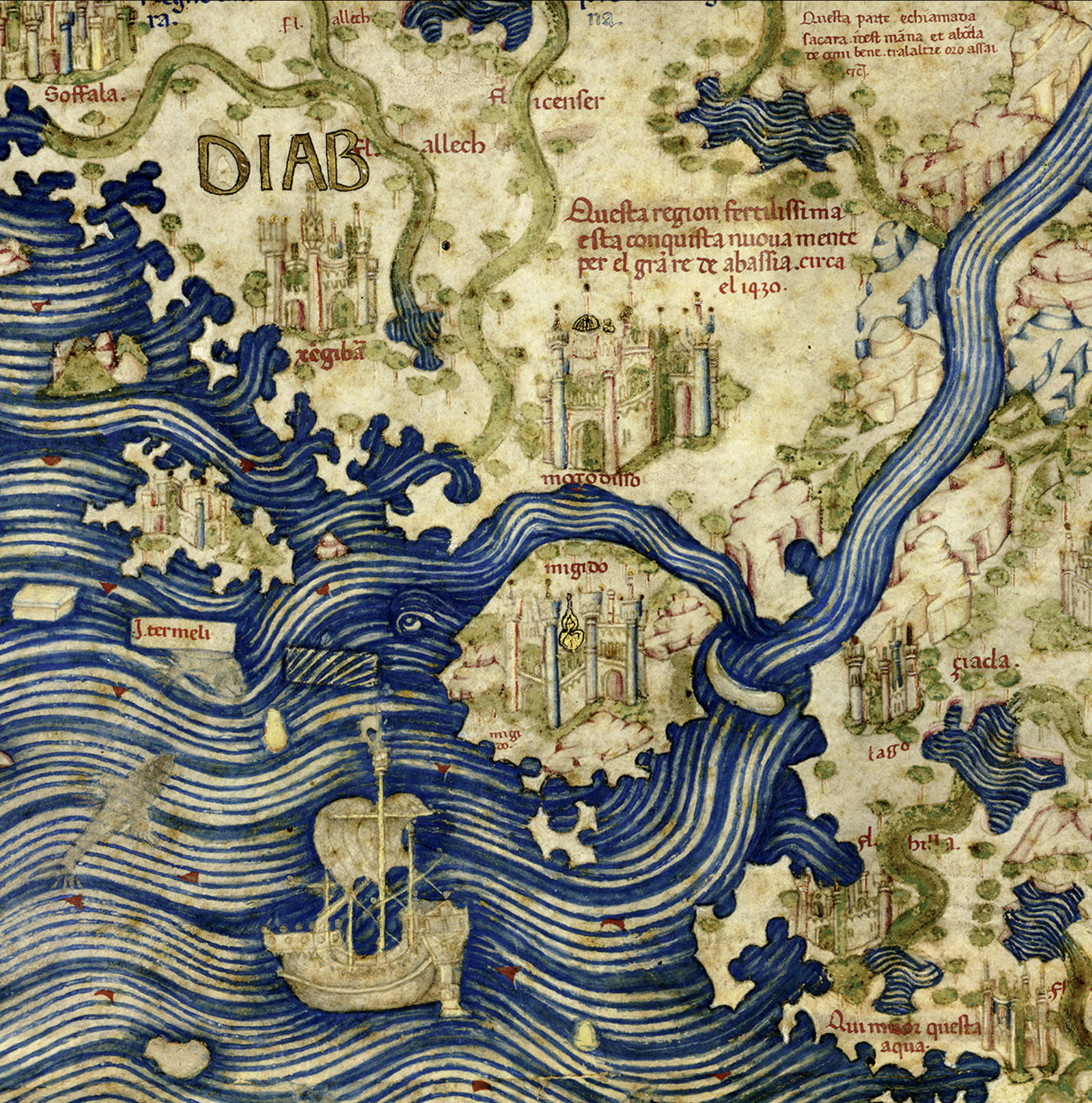
- The "City of Mogadishu" on Fra Mauro's medieval map.
- Capital: Mogadishu
- Common languages: Somali; Arabic
- Religion: Islam
- Government: Sultanate
- Sultan
- Historical era: Middle Ages
  - Established: 10th century
  - Disestablished: 16th century
- Currency: Mogadishan
Preceded by	Succeeded by
Barbaria (region)	Ajuran Sultanate
- Today part of: Somalia

The Sultanate of Mogadishu (Somali: Saldanadda Muqdisho, Arabic: سلطنة مقديشو), also known as Kingdom of Magadazo, was a medieval Muslim sultanate centered in southern Somalia. Established by Abubakr bin Fakhr ad-Din, who served as the first Sultan of the Mogadishu Sultanate and the Fakhr al-Din dynasty. The Fakhr al-Din dynasty ruled up until the late 16th century or start of 1600s until it got replaced by the Muzaffar dynasty. It rose as one of the preeminent powers in the Horn of Africa, and it maintained a vast trading network, dominated the regional gold trade, minted its very own currency, and left an extensive architectural legacy in present-day southern Somalia.

== History ==
=== Origins and early history ===
For many years, Mogadishu functioned as the pre-eminent city in the بلد البربر (Bilad al Barbar - "Land of the Berbers"), as medieval Arabic-speakers named the Somali coast.

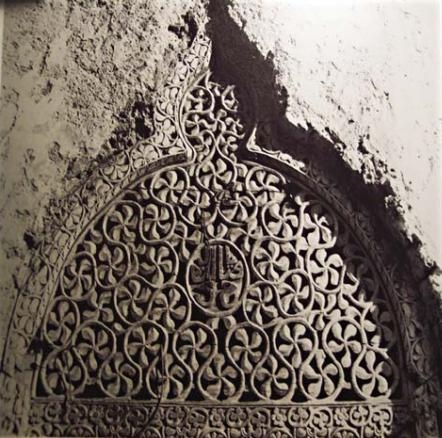
Entrance of a coral stone house in Mogadishu.

The founding ethnicity of Mogadishu and its subsequent sultanate has been a topic of intrigue in Somali studies. Ioan Lewis and Enrico Cerulli believed that the city was founded and ruled by a council of Arab and Persian families. However, the reference Lewis and Cerulli received traces back to one 19th-century text called the Kitab Al-Zunuj, which has been discredited by modern scholars as unreliable and unhistorical. More importantly, it contradicts oral, ancient written sources and archaeological evidence on the pre-existing civilizations and communities that flourished on the Somali coast, and to which were the forefathers of Mogadishu and other coastal cities. Thus, the Arab and Persian founding "myths" are regarded as an outdated false colonialist reflection on Africans ability to create their own sophisticated states.

It has now been widely accepted that there were already communities on the Somali coast with ethnic Somali leadership, to whom the Arab and Persian families had to ask for permission to settle in their cities. It also seems the local Somalis retained their political and numerical superiority on the coast while the Muslim immigrants would go through an assimilation process by adopting the local language and culture. This is corroborated by the 1st-century AD Greek document the Periplus of the Erythraean Sea, detailing multiple prosperous port cities in ancient Somalia, as well as the identification of ancient Sarapion with the city that would later be known as Mogadishu. When Ibn Battuta visited the sultanate in the 14th century, he identified the Sultan as being of Barbara origin, an ancient term used to describe the ancestors of the Somali people. According to Ross E. Dunn, neither Mogadishu nor any other city on the coast could be considered alien enclaves of Arabs or Persians, but were in-fact Somali towns.

There is no doubt that foreign settlers intermarried with the local natives, which is clearly represented in the rich genealogical traditions of the local people. These early settlers were later followed by waves of successive immigrants, who later gave origin to many tribal groups in the town. The 12th-century Syrian historian Yaqut al-Hamawi (c. 1220) wrote about Mogadishu and called it the richest and most powerful city in the region, and described it as being located in the country of the Berbers, certainly a reference to the Somalis.

The founding of the sultanate is variously dated to the mid-13th century or 1330. In the Cambridge History of Africa (1975), Roland Oliver wrote that the founder of the ruling dynasty, Fakhr ad-Din, was of Arab descent. The name of the ruling dynasty that took over from the Qahtani, Fakhruddin, is also thought to be Arabic. However in his 1331 visit to the sultanate, Ibn Battuta wrote that the sultan was "Barbara" (a term for the native Somalis) who spoke "Maqdishi" (likely Somali) and Arabic. Writing in 1981, Joseph Cuoq said that Fakhr ad-Din's depiction as a poor man who seized the city through marriage indicated that he represents a Somali nomad.

=== Mogadishu in the accounts of Marco Polo ===
In the 13th century, the Sultanate of Mogadishu through its trade with medieval China had acquired enough of a reputation in Asia to attract the attention of Kublai Khan. Marco Polo, the renowned Venetian merchant, gave a highly detailed account of Mogadishu's society and the affair with Kublai Khan's envoys where they had imprisoned his envoys on the suspicion of spying.

It is an Island towards the south, about a thousand miles from Socotra. The people are all Saracens, adoring Mohammed. They have four shaykhs, i.e., four Elders, who are said to govern the whole Island. And you must know that it is a most noble and beautiful Island, and one of the greatest in the world, for it is about 4,000 miles in compass. The people live by trade and handicrafts. In this Island, and in another beyond it called Zanzibar, about which we shall tell you afterwards, there are more elephants than in any country in the world. The amount of traffic in elephants' teeth in these two Islands is something astonishing. In this Island, they eat no flesh but that of camels; and of these, they kill an incredible number daily. They say it is the best and wholesome of all flesh; and so they eat of it all the year round. They have in this Island many trees of red sanders, of excellent quality; in fact, all their forests consist of it.

They have also a quantity of ambergris, for whales are abundant in that sea, and they catch numbers of them; and so are Oil-heads, which are a huge kind of fish, which also produce ambergris like the whale. There are numbers of leopards, bears, and lions in the country, and other wild beasts in abundance. Many traders, and many ships go thither with cloths of gold and silk, and many other kinds of goods, and drive a profitable trade. You must know that this Island lies so far south that ships cannot go further south or visit other Islands in that direction, except this one, and that other of which we have to tell you, called Zanzibar. This is because the sea-current runs so strong towards the south that the ships which should attempt it never would get back again. Indeed, the ships of Malabar which visit this island of Mogadishu, and that other of Zanzibar, arrive thither with marvellous speed, for great as the distance is they accomplish it in 20 days, whilst the return voyage takes them more than 3 months. This is because of the strong current running south, which continues with such singular force and in the same direction at all seasons.

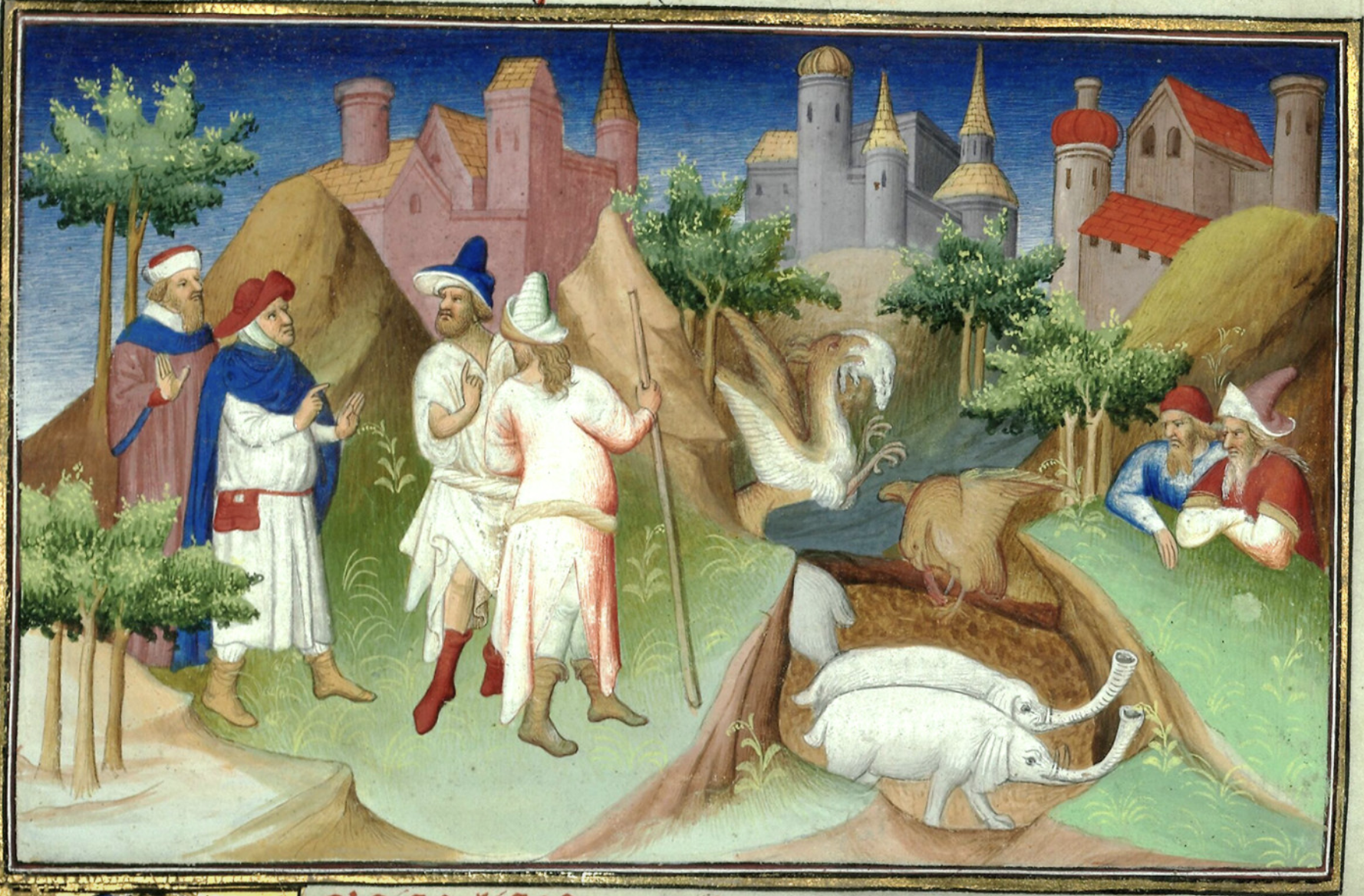
Mongolian envoys at the city of Mogadishu visiting to inquire about the Rukh

It is said that in those other Islands to the south, which the ships are unable to visit because this strong current prevents their return, is found the Griffin, which appears there at certain seasons. The description given of it is however entirely different from what our stories and pictures make it. For persons who had been there and had seen it told Messer Marco Polo that it was for all the world like an eagle, but one indeed of enormous size; so big in fact that its wings covered an extent of 30 paces, and its quills were 12 paces long, and thick in proportion. And it is so strong that it will seize an elephant in its talons and carry him high into the air, and drop him so that he is smashed to pieces; having so killed him the bird gryphon swoops down on him and eats him at leisure. The people of those isles call it the Rukh, and it has no other name.

So I do not know if this is a real griffin, or if there be another manner of bird as great. But this I can tell you for certain, that they are not half lion and half bird as our stories do relate; but enormous as they be they are fashioned just like an eagle. The Great Khan sent to those parts to enquire about these curious matters, and the story was told by those who went thither. He also sent to procure the release of an envoy of his who had been despatched thither, and had been detained; so both those envoys had many wonderful things to tell the Great Kaan about those strange islands, and about the birds I have mentioned. They brought (as I heard) to the Great Khan a feather of the said Rukh, which was stated to measure 90 spans, whilst the quill part was two palms in circumference, a marvellous object! The Great Khan was delighted with it, and gave great presents to those who brought it. They also brought two boar's tusks, which weighed more than 14 lbs. a piece; and you may gather how big the boar must have been that had teeth like that! They related indeed that there were some of those boars as big as a great buffalo. There are also numbers of giraffes and wild asses; and in fact a marvellous number of wild beasts of strange aspect.

=== Madagascar and Mogadishu ===
A well known hypothesis for the origin of the name of Madagascar is that the name is a corrupted transliteration of Mogadishu, the capital of Somalia and an important medieval port on the Indian Ocean. This would have resulted from 13th-century Venetian explorer Marco Polo confusing the two locations in his memoirs, in which he mentions the land of Madagascar to the south of Socotra. This name would then have been popularized on Renaissance maps by European explorers. However, one of the first documents that might explain why Marco Polo called it Madagascar is in a 1609 book written by Jerome Megiser. In this work, Jerome Megiser describes an event in which the rulers of Mogadishu and Adal went to Madagascar with huge fleet of between twenty-five to twenty-six thousand men, in-order to invade the rich island of Taprobane or Sumatra, but a tempest threw them off course and they landed on the coasts of Madagascar, conquering it and signing a treaty with the inhabitants. They remained there for eight months and erected at different points of the island eight pillars on which they engraved "Magadoxo", a name which later, by corruption became Madagascar. Jan Huyghen van Linschoten, a Dutch traveler who copied Portuguese works and maps, confirmed this event by saying "Madagascar got its name from 'makdishu' (Mogadishu) whose "shayk" invaded it."

The legacy of this influence are the Antemoro people whose name derives from the word Temuru which has no grounds of being a Malagasy name. A trace of this name was discovered by Enrico Cerulli in the Ethiopian epic song of Emperor Yeshaq I which mentions the Temur in connexion with the Somali. Even more interesting, the Temur and Somali live as archaisms in the living speech of the Harari people. Thus, the Somali people have ultimately sired the Antemoro.

Furthermore recent genetic studies have revealed the Antemoro to possess the paternal Haplogroup T-M184 and could partially be descendants of the Somalis who settled in Madagascar in the 14th century and intermarried with the local population. In 2013, the Antemoro population was estimated at 500,000. Mogadishu was heavily present in Madagascar and was trading with the inhabitants. The Portuguese captain Manuel Barreto in 1654 requested six royal warships to stop ships coming from Mogadishu and Brava.

=== Mogadishan influence in Sofala ===
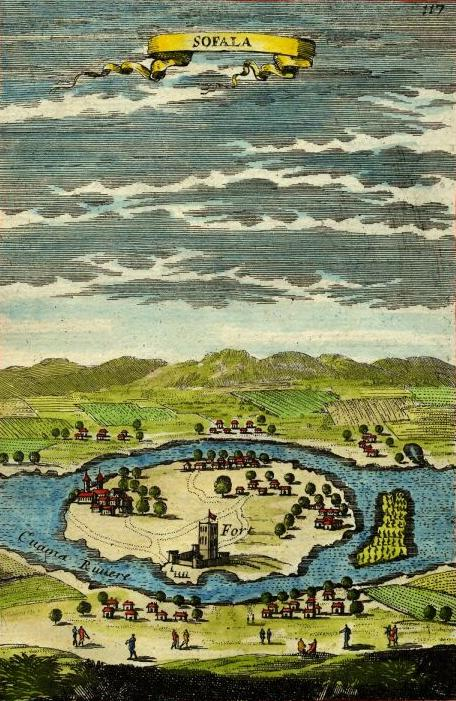
Sofala in 1683 AD, sketch by Mallet

Sofala is located on the Sofala Bank in Sofala Province of Mozambique. It was founded by Somali merchants and seafarers. Sofala in Somali literally means "Go dig". This name was given because the area is rich with resources. One of the oldest harbors documented in Southern Africa, medieval Sofala was erected on the edge of a wide estuary formed by the Buzi River (called Rio de Sofala in older maps). Somali merchants from Mogadishu established a colony in Mozambique to extract gold from the mines in Sofala.

The Buzi River connected Sofala to the internal market town of Manica, and from there to the gold fields of Great Zimbabwe. Sometime in the 10th century, Sofala emerged as a small trading post and was incorporated into the greater global Somali trade network. In the 1180s, Sultan Suleiman Hassan of Kilwa (in present-day Tanzania) seized control of Sofala, and brought Sofala into the Kilwa Sultanate and the Swahili cultural sphere. Mogadishu merchants had long kept Sofala a secret from their Kilwan rivals, who up until then rarely sailed beyond Cape Delgado. One day, a fisherman caught a large bite off Kilwa and was dragged by the fish around Cape Delgado, through the Mozambique Channe, all the way down to the Sofala banks. The fisherman made his way back up to Kilwa to report to the Sultan Suleiman Hassan what he had seen. Hearing of the gold trade, the sultan loaded up a ship with cloth and immediately raced down there, guided by the fisherman. The Kilwan sultan offered a better deal to the Mwenemutapa, and was allowed to erect a Kilwan factory and colony on the island and nudge the Mogadishans permanently out. The Swahili strengthened its trading capacity by having, among other things, rivergoing dhows ply the Buzi and Save Rivers to ferry the gold extracted in the hinterlands to the coast.

=== Mogadishu's society and Golden Age ===
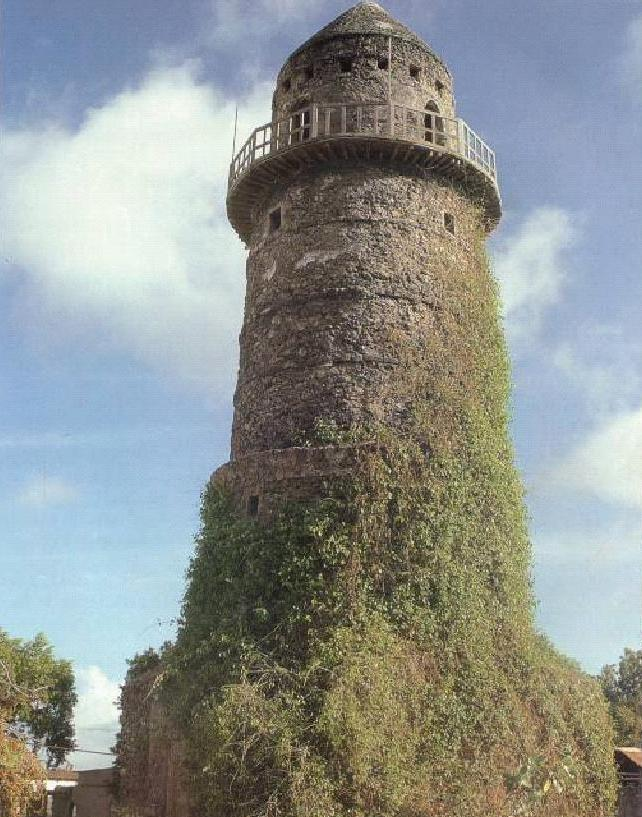
Almanara Tower, Mogadishu.

In the early 13th century, Mogadishu along with other coastal and interior Somali cities in southern Somalia and eastern Abyssinia came under the Ajuran Sultanate control and experienced another Golden Age. During his travels, Ibn Sa'id al-Maghribi (1213–1286) noted that Mogadishu city had already become the leading Islamic center in the region. By the time of the Moroccan traveler Ibn Battuta's appearance on the Somali coast in 1331, the city was at the zenith of its prosperity. He described Mogadishu as "an exceedingly large city" with many rich merchants, which was famous for its high quality fabric that it exported to Egypt, among other places.

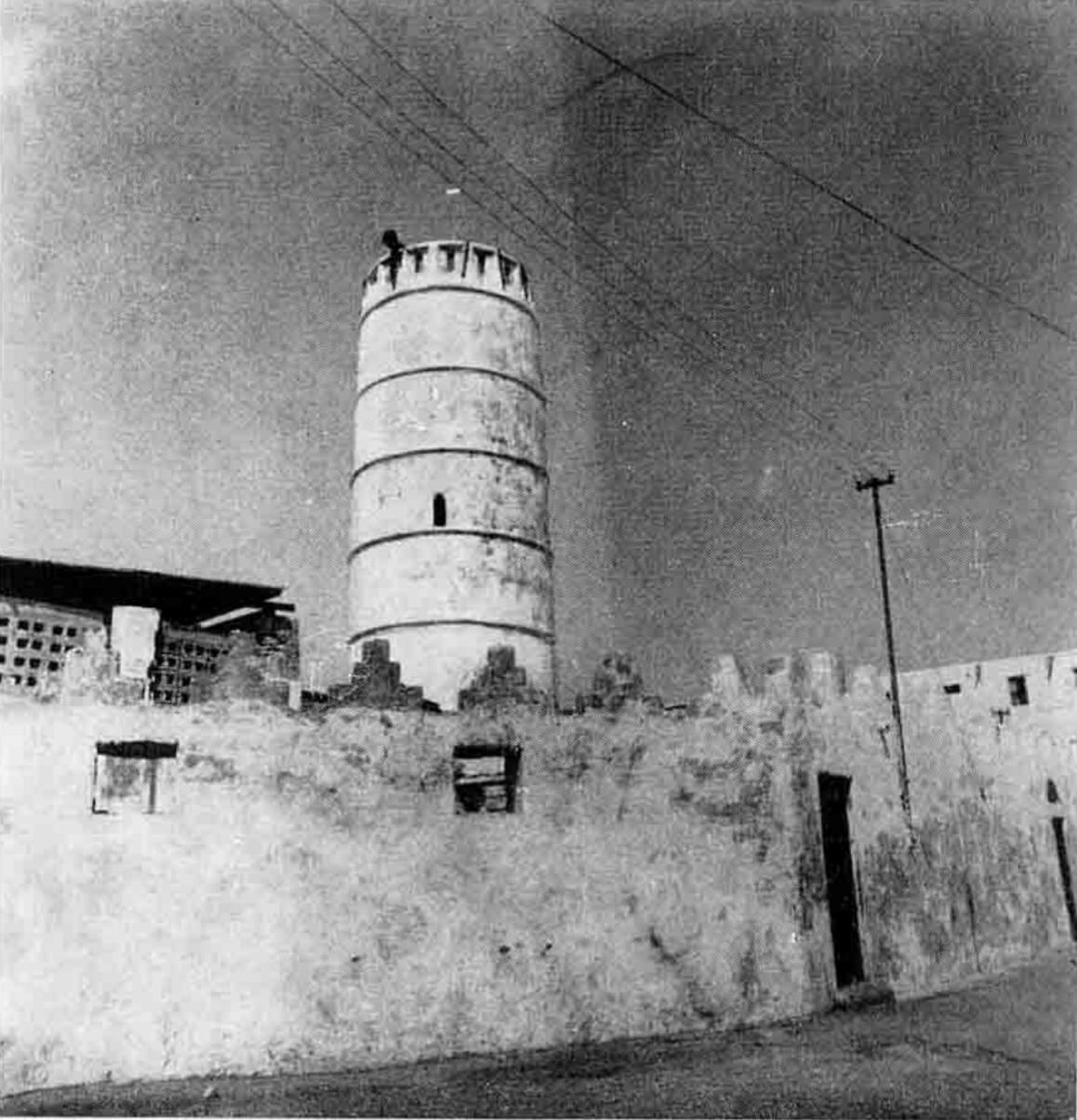
Xamar Weyne's Friday mosque (Jamacaha Xamar Weyne in Somali) according to Ibn Battuta, he and the Sultan prayed here

He also describes the hospitality of the people of Mogadishu and how locals would put travelers up in their home to help the local economy. Battuta added that the city was ruled by a Somali sultan, Abu Bakr ibn Shaikh 'Umar, who had a Barbara origin, and spoke the Mogadishan Somali and the Arabic language with equal fluency. The sultan also had a retinue of wazirs (ministers), legal experts, commanders, royal eunuchs, and other officials at his beck and call. Ibn Khaldun (1332 to 1406) noted in his book that Mogadishu was a massive metropolis. He also claimed that the city was a very populous with many wealthy merchants.

In a book written in 1670, by John Ogiliby he describes Mogadishu:

As you Travel more Northerly towards the Red-Sea, you come to the Kingdom of Magadaxo (Mogadishu), which hath been formerly so powerful, that all the Mahumetans on this Coast were subject to it.

This Territory produces great abundance of Barley, with variety of Fruits, and feeds huge Droves of Horses and other Cattel. Some of the Inhabitants are brown, some black, and some white, yet notwithstanding this difference of complexion, they agree in Language, all speaking Arabic

The Head City Madagaxo hath gain’d the repute of great Wealth, by the Trade of the Kambayan and Aden Merchants, bringing thither all sorts of Clothes, Drugs, and Spices, and receiving from thence in Barter, Gold, Ivory, and Wax.

This period gave birth to notable figures such as Abd al-Aziz of Mogadishu who was described as the governor and island chief of the Maldives by Ibn Battuta After him is named the Abdul-Aziz Mosque in Mogadishu which has remained there for centuries. The Sultanate of Mogadishu sent ambassadors to China to establish diplomatic ties, creating the first ever recorded African community in China and the most notable was Sa'id of Mogadishu who was the first African man to set foot in China. In return, Emperor Yongle, the third emperor of the Ming dynasty (1368–1644), dispatched one of the largest fleets in Chinese history to trade with the sultanate. The fleet, under the leadership of the famed Hui Muslim Zheng He, arrived at Mogadishu, while the city was at its zenith. Along with gold, frankincense, and fabrics, Zheng brought back the first ever African wildlife to China, which included hippopotamuses, giraffes, and gazelles. In Mogadishu, the center of a thriving weaving industry known as toob benadir (specialized for the markets in Egypt and Syria), together with Merca and Barawa also served as transit stops for Swahili merchants from Mombasa and Malindi and for the gold trade from Kilwa. Jewish merchants from the Hormuz also brought their Indian textile and fruit to the Somali coast in exchange for grain and wood.

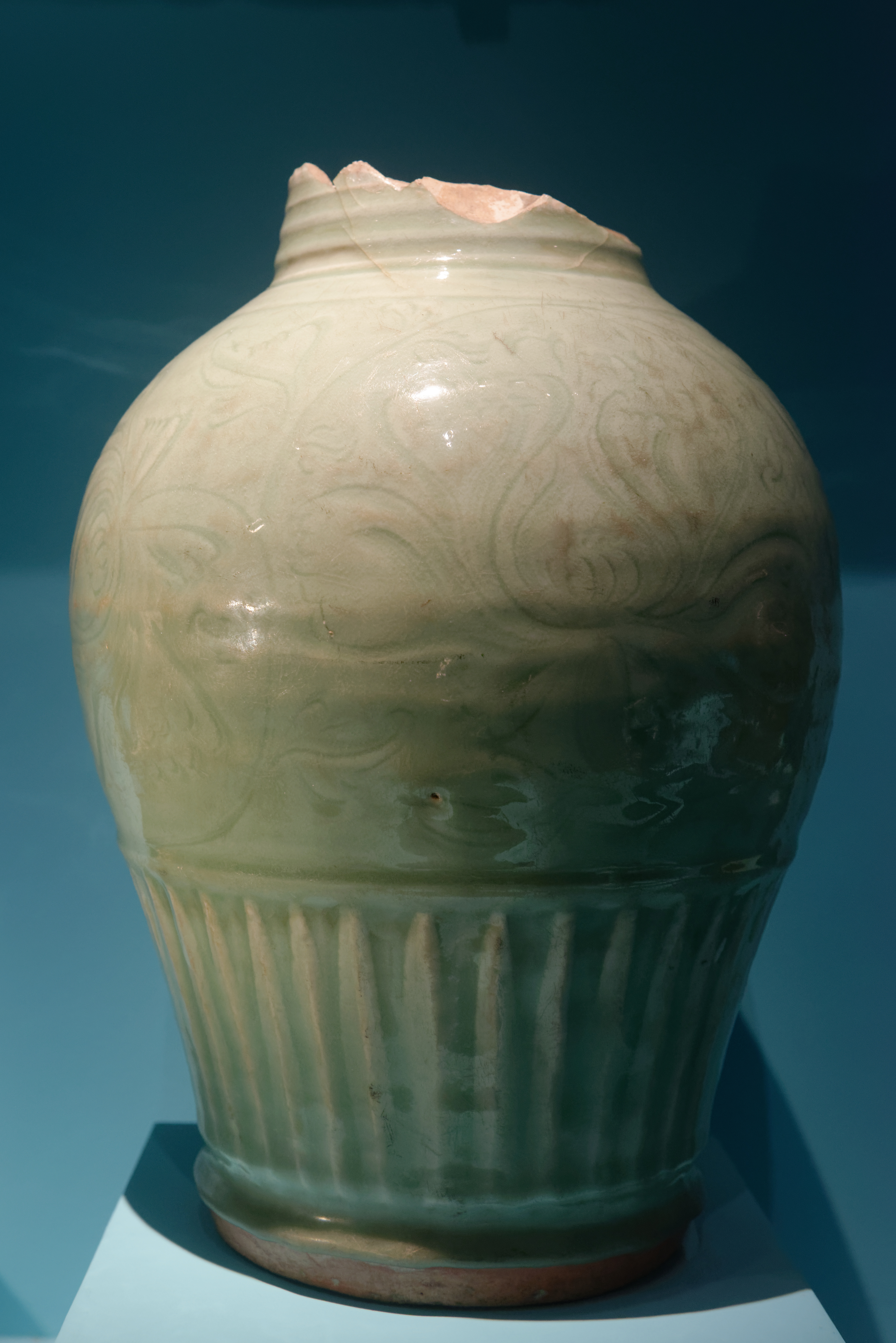
Yuan dynasty-era Celadon vase from Mogadishu.

Vasco da Gama, who passed by Mogadishu in the 15th century, noted that it was a large city with houses of four or five stories high and big palaces in its center and many mosques with cylindrical minarets. In the 16th century, Duarte Barbosa, the famous Portuguese traveler wrote about Mogadishu (c 1517–1518):

It has a king over it, and is a place of great trade in merchandise. Ships come there from the kingdom of Cambay (India) and from Aden with stuffs of all kinds, and with spices. And they carry away from there much gold, ivory, beeswax, and other things upon which they make a profit. In this town there is plenty of meat, wheat, barley, and horses, and much fruit: it is a very rich place.

In 1542, the Portuguese commander João de Sepúvelda led a small fleet on an expedition to the Somali coast. During this expedition he briefly attacked Mogadishu, capturing an Ottoman ship and firing upon the city, which compelled the sultan of Mogadishu to sign a peace treaty with the Portuguese.

According to the 16th-century explorer, Leo Africanus indicates that the native inhabitants of the Mogadishu polity were of the same origins as the denizens of the northern people of Zeila the capital of Adal Sultanate. They were generally tall with a chest nut complexion, with some being darker. They would wear traditional rich white silk wrapped around their bodies and have Islamic turbans and coastal people would only wear sarongs, and spoke Arabic as a lingua franca. Their weaponry consisted of traditional Somali weapons such as swords, daggers, spears, battle axes, and bows, although they received assistance from its close ally the Ottoman Empire and with the import of firearms such as muskets and cannons.

Most were Muslims, although a few adhered to heathen Bedouin tradition; there were also a number of Abyssinian Christians further inland. Mogadishu itself was a wealthy, and well-built city-state, which maintained commercial trade with kingdoms across the world. The metropolis city was surrounded by walled stone fortifications.

== Sultans ==
The various sultans of Mogadishu are mainly known from the Mogadishu currency on which many of their names are engraved. A private collection of coins found in Mogadishu revealed a minimum of 23 sultans. The founder of the sultanate was reportedly Fakhr ad-Din, who was the first sultan of Mogadishu and founder of the Fakhr ad-Din dynasty, while his brother Omar ad-Din is stated to have settled in Harar. While only a handful of the pieces have been precisely dated, the Mogadishu Sultanate's first coins were minted at the beginning of the 13th century, with the last issued around the early 17th century.

A Harar chronicle claims that during the Middle Ages, Ahmed bin Adam, the sultan of Mogadishu, assisted the Harar monarchs repel a Persian invasion.

For trade, the Ajuran Sultanate and the Muzaffar dynasty also utilized the Mogadishu currency at the end of the 16th century. Mogadishan coins have been found as far away as the present-day country of the United Arab Emirates in the Middle East.

The following list of the sultans of Mogadishu is abridged and is primarily derived from these mints.

- Abu Bakr b. Fakhr ad Din
- Ismail b. Muhammad
- Al-Rahman b. al-Musa'id
- Yusuf b. Sa'id
- Sultan Muhammad
- Rasul b. 'Ali
- Yusuf b. Abi Bakr
- Malik b. Sa'id
- Sultan 'Umar
- Zubayr b. 'Umar

== Trade ==
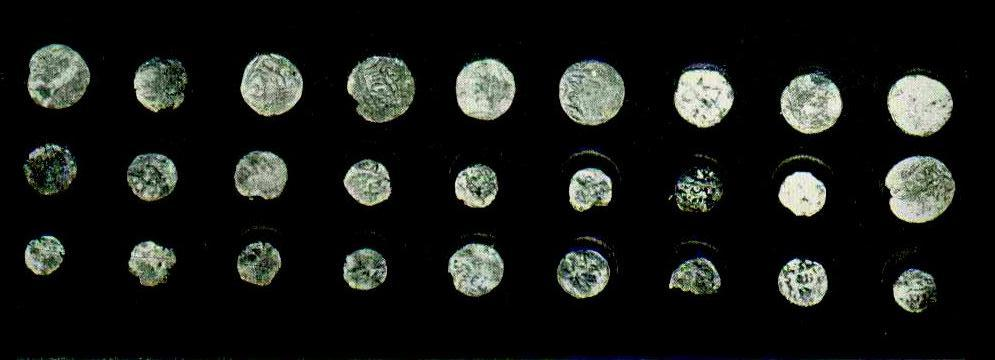
Mogadishu currency.

During the 9th century, Mogadishu minted its own Mogadishu currency for its medieval trading empire in the Indian Ocean. It centralized its commercial hegemony by minting coins to facilitate regional trade. The currency bore the names of the 13 successive sultans of Mogadishu. The oldest pieces date back to 923-24 and on the front bear the name of Ismail ibn Muhammad, the then sultan of Mogadishu. According to Richard Pankhurst, archaeological excavations have recovered many coins from China, Sri Lanka, and Vietnam. The majority of the Chinese coins date to the Song dynasty, although the Ming dynasty and Qing dynasty "are also represented".

On the back of the coins, the names of the four Caliphs of the Rashidun Caliphate are inscribed. Other coins were also minted in the style of the extant Fatimid and the Ottoman currencies. Mogadishan coins were in widespread circulation. Pieces have been found as far away as modern United Arab Emirates, where a coin bearing the name of a 12th-century Somali sultan Ali b. Yusuf of Mogadishu was excavated. Bronze pieces belonging to the sultans of Mogadishu have also been found at Belid near Salalah in Dhofar. Coins from the Emirate of Harar were also used along the local currency in the 17th and 18th centuries.

Upon arrival in Mogadishu's harbor, it was custom for small boats to approach the arriving vessel, and their occupants to offer food and hospitality to the merchants on the ship. If a merchant accepted such an offer, then he was obligated to lodge in that person's house and to accept their services as sales agent for whatever business they transacted in Mogadishu. The custom of sponsorship where merchants would be embraced by the locals was particular to the Somali coast and was a common form of trade in the region as late as the nineteenth century. Zheng He, the famous Chinese traveler obtained zebra and lions from Mogadishu and camels and ostriches from Barawa.
