= Sa'id of Mogadishu =

14th-century Somali Islamic scholar and traveler

- Title: Sheikh

Personal life
- Era: Medieval
- Region: Somali Peninsula/Arabian Peninsula
- Main interest(s): Islamic philosophy, Translation, polemics

Religious life
- Religion: Islam

Sa'id of Mogadishu (Somali: Saciid ka Muqdisho, Arabic: سعيد من مقديشو Sa'iid min maqadīshū) was a 14th-century Somali scholar and traveler.

== Biography ==
Sa'id was born in Mogadishu in the year 1301.

“I met in this Masjid a jurist, pious from Mogadishu called Sa‘īd, of fine figure and character. He used to fast continually, and I was told that he had studied in Makkah for fourteen years and for the same length of time [another fourteen years] in Madinah. He had met Abu Numayy, the Amir of Makkah [r. 1254-1301], and al-Mansūr Ibn Jammāz, the Amir of Madinah [r. 1300-1325]. He had travelled [throughout] India and China.”

Sa'id left Mogadishu as a teenager to study in Mecca and Medina, where he remained for 28 years gathering knowledge and gaining many disciples. His reputation as a scholar earned him audiences with the Amirs of Mecca and Medina.

From this it is apparent that Sa‘īd was not only a well travelled scholar known in the ways of the world, but he must have recruited many students due to his close link with the Amirs.

“Faqih Sa’id from Mogadishu [...] finally settled down in the small port-town of Ezhimala and collaborated there with Faqih Husayn, possibly the author of Qayd al- jami’, the first known Shafi’ite text from Malabar. Faqih Sa’id is an epitome of many more East African scholars who arrived in the Malabar Coast and partook in its religious spectrums, and their contributions await further research.”

Sa'id is said to have afterwards travelled across the Muslim world and visited Bengal and Yuan China. During his stay at a mosque on the west coast of India, he encountered fellow Muslim traveller Ibn Battuta. According to scholar Peter Jackson, Sa'id might have during this occasion shared with Battuta accounts of his travels in China and detailed the political landscape and succession of the Yuan Dynasty, information which Battuta would eventually add in his own chronicles. Sa'id may have died on 1361 or 1365.
