= Mogadishu currency =

Coinage minted by the Sultanate of Mogadishu

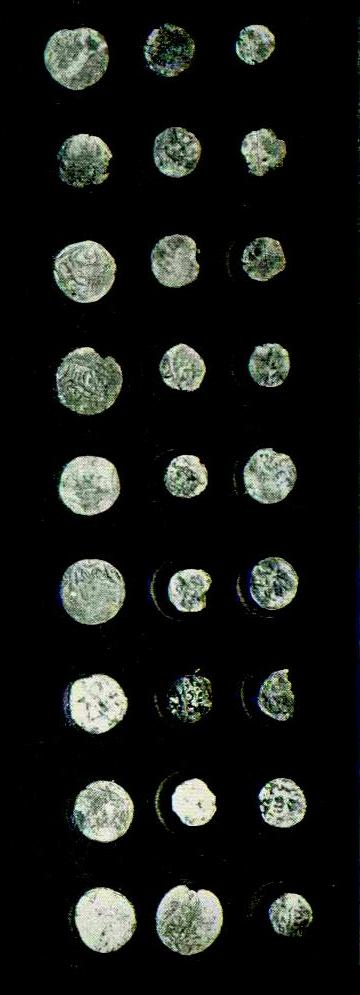
Sultanate of Mogadishu currency

Mogadishu currency was an old coinage system minted by the medieval Sultanate of Mogadishu.

== Overview ==
In order to facilitate regional trade, the Mogadishu Sultanate began minting its own coins, a move which had the effect of centralizing its commercial hegemony. The currency bears the names of 23 successive Sultans of Mogadishu. Some coins also adopted the style of the extant Fatimid and Ottoman currencies. For trade, the Ajuran Empire minted its own Ajuran currency. It also utilized the Mogadishan currency originally minted by the Sultanate of Mogadishu, which later became incorporated into the Ajuran Empire during the 13th century.

Mogadishan coins were in widespread circulation. Pieces have been found as far away as the present-day United Arab Emirates, where a coin bearing the name of a 15th-century Somali Sultan Ali b. Yusuf of Mogadishu was excavated. Over the course of three archaeological expeditions in Warsheikh between 1920 and 1921, Enrico Cerulli also uncovered coins from the medieval Sultans of Mogadishu. They were deposited in the Scuola Orientale of the University of Rome, but were later lost in World War II. According to Cerulli, similar coins were found in the village of Mos (Moos), located about 14 km to Warsheikh's northwest. Freeman-Grenville (1963) also record another discovery of ancient coins in the latter town. During excavation in Iraq in 1971, a copper piece was discovered bearing the name of Sultan of Mogadishu Ali ibn Yusuf. Bronze coins belonging to the Sultans of Mogadishu have also been found at Belid near Salalah in Dhofar.

== See also ==
- Ajuran currency
- Somali aristocratic and court titles
