= Hirsi Bulhan Farah =

Somali politician

- Xirsi Bulxan Faarax

Personal details
- Citizenship: Somali

Hirsi Bulhan Farah (c. 1922 – 2 February 2022) was a Somali politician, former political prisoner, former minister of Somalia, member of parliament in two different terms (the civilian government and the transitional federal government), interim chairman of the Somali parliament, activist, entrepreneur and greatly respected and knowledgeable elder.

== History of his parents ==
Born in the town of Eyl, an ancient town located in northeastern Somalia (Puntland) to two prominent parents Bulhan and Dhuuxay. He was one of many kids. Hirsi's father Bulhan was a wealthy man with hundreds of camels and other livestock to his name. Bulhan was a protrusive general and a well-known sharpshooter in northern Somalia. He was the main general (abaandule) of Sultan Mohamoud Ali Shire and his Warsangeli Sultanate army. After some quarrel and an assassination attempt by members of the Warsangeli clan, Bulhan left and became the commanding general of Boqor Osman Mahamuud who was the ruler of the Majerteen Sultanate. During his years as commander of the Warsangeli army, Bulhan married a prominent woman of Sultan Mohamoud Ali Shire's family who later was murdered. They had a daughter together named Faduma Bulhan. After leaving Sanaag he married Dhuuxay (Hirsi's mother) and another woman named Hawo, after some time he married what would be his fourth wife. All in all, Bulhan had 16 children in total. During Bulhan's military campaigns against Sayyid Mohammed Abdullah Hassan he bravely fought the Dervish movement who had killed his father Guune years prior, when he was still a child. Guune (Hirsi's grandfather), was also a commander in his own right. He was fighting the Sayyid and was ultimately killed by the Dervish movement, in the Sool region of northwestern Somalia.

Bulhan's objective was to avenge his father's death by killing Mohammed Abdullah Hassan himself, he never fulfilled his goal as a result of him having to leave the front-line as a consequence of him being critically wounded during the fighting. Time went by and he healed from his injuries. Being a man of immense faith he decided to fulfill one of the five pillars of Islam so he subsequently embarked on a journey to perform the yearly pilgrimage to Mecca (Hajj). Hirsi was four years old when his father embarked upon the Hajj journey, a trip that would be the last time he ever saw his father again. After completing the Hajj pilgrimage Bulhan and his clansmen traveled to Medina. During their stay in Medina on a day after the noon (Zuhr) prayer, an unknown man dressed in white came to the tent of Bulhan and his clansmen. The unknown man asked the group, that were on their way back home to Somalia, which one of them was going to stay and leave the rest of the group behind. The group was astonished by the question and kept silent except Bulhan who insisted that he was going to stay. None of them had intended to stay because of the many responsibilities and families that awaited them back home. The clansmen thought Bulhan had gone mad and they tried their best to persuade him to change his mind and follow them back home to Somalia. They tried without success, and after a while, the group went to rest in waiting of the afternoon (Asr) prayer. Bulhan never woke up from his rest and was shortly after buried in Medina.

== Early life and political career ==
Hirsi had a tough but loving upbringing and spent the first years of his life in a nomadic type of lifestyle; he matured at an early age and left home at age eleven. He left Eyl for the city of Qardho where he became an entrepreneur. During that time of his preadolescence, he and his friends plotted coup d'etat attempts against the Italian colonial administration. He became Minister of Livestock in the civilian government of the 1960s. He became Director of the Department of Plant Protection and Locust Control, in the Ministry of Agriculture in Mogadishu. He was also the chief executive officer of the largest banana exporting company in Somalia during the 1970s. During the Mohamed Siad Barre regime, Bulhan was imprisoned for nine years due to his overt resistance against the regime.

A couple of days before Abdirashid Ali Sharmarke's assassination in the city of Las Anod, he had requested multiple times that Bulhan accompany him on the trip to the northwestern town. Unfortunately, due to different circumstances, Bulhan could not make the trip to Las Anod where president Sharmarke was assassinated by his own bodyguard. Directly after the assassination of Sharmarke, Somalia's second president, on October 15, 1969, Bulhan and the other Ministers of the civilian government were rounded up and imprisoned. Sharmarke's assassination was quickly followed by a military coup d'état on October 21, 1969 (the day after his funeral). In which the Somali Army seized power without encountering armed opposition — essentially a bloodless takeover. The putsch was spearheaded by Major general Mohamed Siad Barre, who at the time commanded the army.

== Somali Salvation Democratic Front ==
These events led Bulhan to join the Somali Salvation Democratic Front (SSDF), the first resistance group against the authoritarian regime of Mohamed Siad Barre. Bulhan joined (and financially supported) the organization after his release from imprisonment. The Somali Salvation Democratic Front was founded by several army officers. It was a political and paramilitary umbrella organization, with its power base mainly in the Majeerteen clan. Bulhan immediately got a high ranking position due to his previous experience as a politician and his reputation, being a man of great respect.

Some of the group's prominent founders were Abdullahi Yusuf Ahmed, Somalia's former military attaché to Moscow, and Abdullahi Ahmed Irro, a prominent general and founder of the National Academy for Strategy. Abdullahi Yusuf eventually became President of Somalia in 2004 and was the first elected president of Puntland, an autonomous state of northern Somalia, in July 1998. Irro later served as a Professor of Strategy at various Somali military institutes in the 1980s. He had a hand in formulating strategic training syllabi for senior military personnel, the presidential advisory councils, and legislators. He also played a leading role in forging working partnerships with several schools in Egypt, France, and the United States. Both men were cherished colleagues of Hirsi Bulhan Farah.

== Post-civil war ==
After the Somali Transitional Federal Parliament was inaugurated in Nairobi, in 2004 the former minister was elected as interim chairman.

Bulhan produced 10 children with his wife, Asli Osman Haji Djibril. One died at a young age and they currently have nine children together. He has one child with his second wife, Hali Haji Ahmed Farajar.

Bulhan later lived in Stockholm, Sweden and in Somalia. He participated in efforts to further stabilize and create a peaceful society in Somalia. He occasionally interviewed with various Somali media outlets.

Bulhan died on 2 February 2022.

== See also ==
- Somali Youth League
