= Osman Yusuf Kenadid =

Somali poet, scholar, writer and prince; inventor of Osmanya script (1889–1972)

- Cusmaan Yuusuf Keenadiid 𐒋𐒚𐒈𐒑𐒛𐒒 𐒕𐒓𐒈𐒚𐒍 𐒏𐒜𐒒𐒖𐒆𐒕𐒆
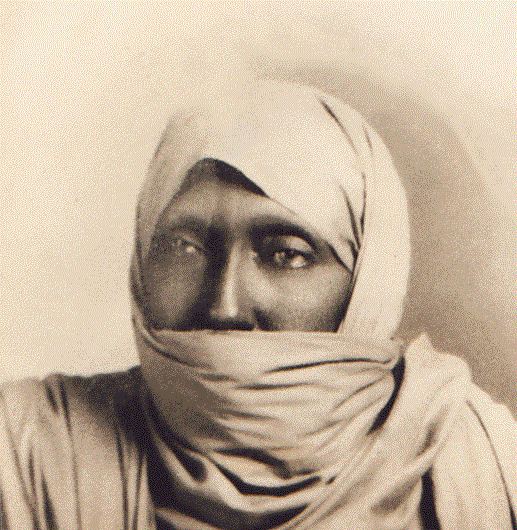
- Born: 1889; Ceel Huur, Hobyo Sultanate
- Died: 14 August 1972 (aged 82–83); Mogadishu, Somali Democratic Republic
- Occupations: Poet, writer, teacher, ruler
- Parents: Yusuf Ali Kenadid (father); Dahabo Islaan Aadan (mother)
- Family: Ali Yusuf Kenadid (brother)

Osman Yusuf Kenadid (Somali: Cusmaan Yuusuf Keenadiid; Arabic: عثمان يوسف كينيديد; 1889 – 14 August 1972) was a Somali poet, writer, teacher and ruler. Born in Ceel Huur in 1889, he went on to create the Osmanya alphabet for writing Somali. He died on 31 August 1972 (aged 83) in Mogadishu.

== Biography ==
Kenadid grew up in the town of Galkayo, situated in north-central present-day Somalia. He served as a leader in the Majeerteen Sultanate of Hobyo and was the son of the polity's founder, Sultan Yusuf Ali Kenadid. He is also the father of Yasin Osman Kenadid. Kenadid hails from the Osman Mahamuud Majeerteen Darod clan.

Also a writer, Kenadid published many works on various subjects related to Somali history and science, including textbooks on the Somali language, astronomy, geography and Somali philosophy. He borrowed significantly from the vast ancient Somali cultural repository, working towards a renaissance of this rich past.

In the early 20th century many young Somalis felt it was of utmost importance to have a national script but their nationalism was decidedly non-Arab. In order to assert their sovereignty, many felt that the Somali language, unique in the world, ought to have a unique script, thus in response to a national campaign to settle on a standard orthography for the Somali language (which had long lost its ancient script), Kenadid devised a phonetically sophisticated alphabet called Osmanya for representing the sounds of Somali.

During this time it has been recorded that while Kenadid was writing letters to his family with the unsuitable Arabic script, he said to himself: you are Somali, you speak Somali, why don't you have Somali letters? He then developed his own script, which bore no resemblance either to Arabic or to Latin, and began to teach it.

Kenadid's Osmanya was subsequently introduced into the local schools in his Sultanate. When the Italian colonial authorities got wind of this, they promptly imprisoned him in Mogadishu since they feared that the script was a manifestation of nationalism. With Kenadid's arrest, all efforts to develop a standard orthography for the Somali language abruptly came to a halt for the next 25 years.

The rise of nationalist sentiment that followed the end of the Second World War – and especially the birth of the Somali Youth League political party, of which Kenadid was a founding member – brought about a revival of interest in and use of the Osmanya script. This renaissance would last until the government of then President of Somalia Mohamed Siad Barre unilaterally elected in 1972 to make the modified Latin script devised by Shire Jama Ahmed the nation's official writing system.
