= Mohamoud Ali Shire =

Sultan of the Warsangeli (r. late 19th century–January 1920

Mohamoud Ali Shire Maxamuud Cali Shire محمود علي شري
- Sultan of the Warsangali
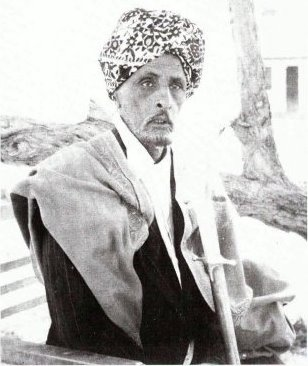
- Mohamoud Ali Shire in 1905
- Reign: unknown – January 1920
- Predecessor: Ali Shire
- Successor: Suldaan Sicid Abdisalan
- Born: Las Khorey, Warsengali Sultanate (now Somalia)
- Died: 1960; Badhan, Sanaag, Somalia
- Dynasty: Warsangali
- Religion: Islam

Mohamoud Ali Shire MBE (Somali: Maxamuud Cali Shire, Arabic: محمود علي شري; died 1960) was a Somali Sultan of the Warsengali Sultanate. He bore the title Sultan (also referred to as Senior Akil) of the Warsangali. He was centered at Las Khorey.

== Reign ==
Mohamoud Ali Shire served as Sultan of the Warsengali Sultanate during the late 19th century and early 20th century.

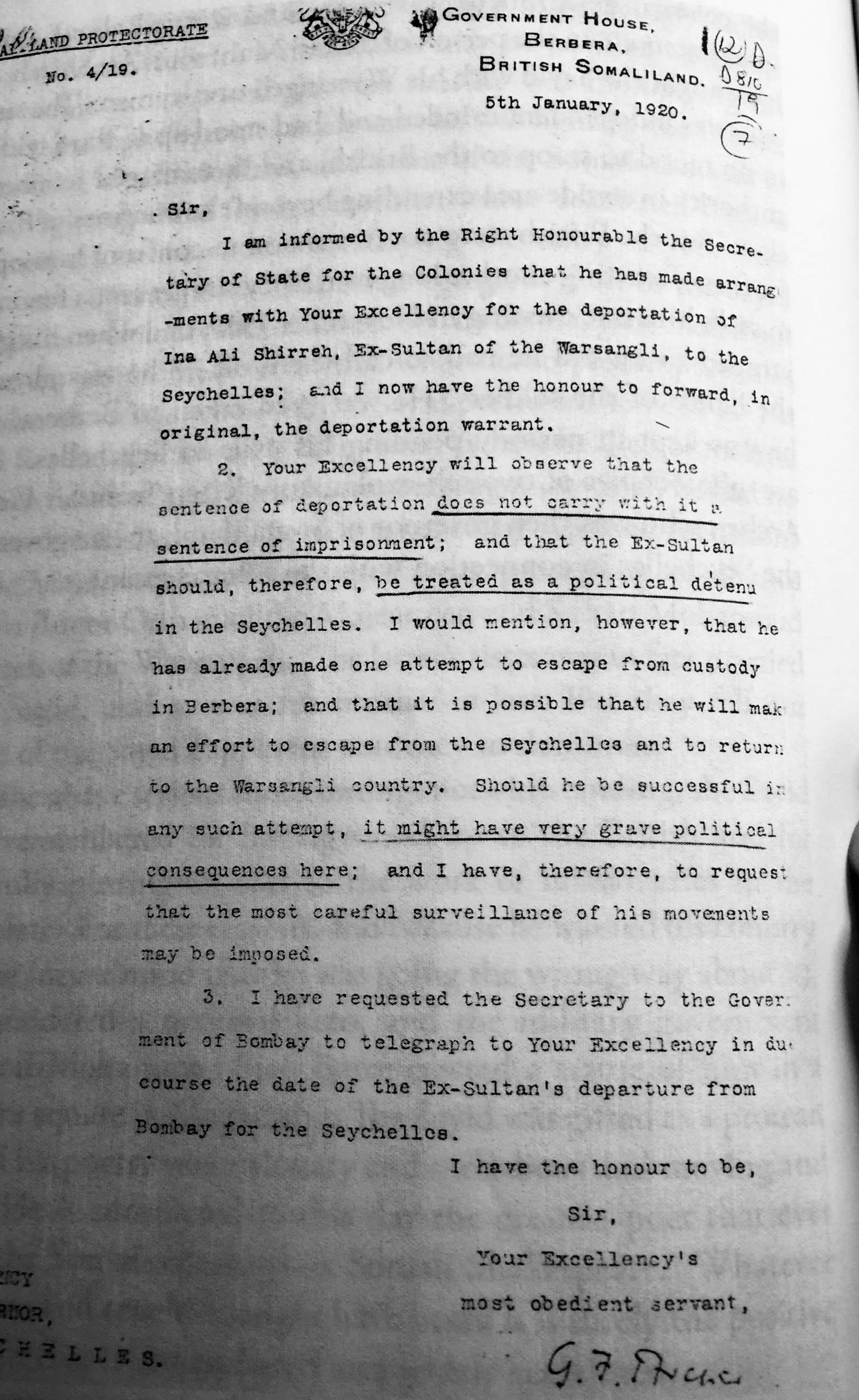
Deportation letter, January 1920

=== Dervish movement ===
Shire was the father-in-law of Sayyid Mohammed Abdullah Hassan, whose Dervish movement fought a two-decade long war against British, Italian and Ethiopian forces. Shire already had four wives of his own. He sought to marry Hassan's daughter Faṭmah, offering a bride-price (yarad) of ten camels loaded with draperies and silk, but Hassan refused to give her hand in marriage to Shire. The two leaders regularly engaged in trade and political intrigue.

In 1886, Shire and other elders of the Warsangali clan signed a treaty with the British Empire establishing a protectorate in his territory. This came following other protectorate treaties signed by the British Empire and other Somali clans (Habar Awal, Gadabuursi, Habar Toljaala, Habar Gerhajis and Easa). During the subsequent power struggle between Hassan's Dervishes and British forces, Shire decided to throw the Warsangali's lot with the former polity. In January 1908, his men opened fire on a British ship that was about to land on their littoral. After a quarter of a century of holding British forces at bay, the Dervishes were finally defeated in 1920 as a direct consequence of Britain's new policy of aerial bombardment.

== Exile in the Seychelles ==
Soon after the Dervishes' defeat, the British Secretary of State sentenced Shire to exile in the Seychelles for a period of seven years. The justification for his deportation was that Shire had exerted his own form of "native authority". According to Wardheer News, his "independent policy, strength and indifference to the powers surrounding him, including the British [had] vexed London and led to his arrest and deportation". Shire was apprehended and transported by vessel to Berbera, from where he later attempted to escape on January 5, 1920. On May 5, 1920, a telegram was sent to the Secretary of State for the Colonies for the deportation of Sultan Mohamoud Ali Shire. The letter states,

Your excellency will observe that the sentence of deportation does not carry with it a sentence of imprisonment, and that the Ex-Sultan should, therefore, be treated as a political detenu in the Seychelles...It possible that he will make an effort to escape from the Seychelles and to return to the Warsangeli Country. Should he be successful in any such attempt, it might have very grave political consequences here; and I have, therefore, to request that the most careful surveillance of his movements.

On May 3, 1920, on board HMS Odin, Sultan Shire was delivered to British authorities in the Seychelles from their colony in Bombay, India. At the time of his arrival on the Seychelles archipelago, a number of other prominent anti-imperialist leaders were also exiled there, including Sa'ad Zaghloul Pasha, the former Prime Minister of Egypt, with whom Sultan Shire would soon develop a rapport.

Shire lived in a house in the Anse Etoile district on the island of Mahé, which sat on a path near the public road. The colonial government had leased the land from Charles Mederic Savy. Under the leasing agreement, the renting party was allowed to collect coconuts, gather water from the river, and keep poultry and pigs. Shire also had to check-in three times every day at the local police station across the street. Although the terms of Shire's deportation allowed him to bring a spouse, he spent most of his time in exile alone, without relatives or companions.

Shire wrote a number of letters to the colonial governors of the British Somaliland Protectorate and Seychelles, which appealed for his release. These epistles were characterized by willfulness, exaggeration and overstatement on Shire's part, serving to mask his resistance strategies. In the first such hyperbolic letter, sent in 1922, Shire pleaded to the Governor of the Seychelles to allow him to return to his family.

Besides emphasising that he simply wanted to rejoin his wife and children and asserting that he did not wish to be Sultan, Shire swore that he had disavowed his earlier political beliefs and promised to recognise the authority of the British government. These assurances were ineffective. Shire continued to ask for repatriation, but the colonial governors routinely turned down these requests. In order to avoid engendering anti-colonial sentiments, the colonial government imposed edicts which censored letters that exiled individuals sent to their family and compatriots back home. Shire regularly found a way around these controls by utilizing Somali sailors as couriers, with one of these missives arriving in British Somaliland via Ceylon. He and other prominent exiles employed letter-writing as major non-violent political tools of communication, through which they were able to describe their time in exile beyond the Seychelles.

He was, however, dismayed by this state of affairs. Fiennes, who was responsible for Shire's safe custody, argued that the Sultan would be more placated if his wife were with him. In an unusual move for a policeman, the officer later penned a letter in which he urged the Governor to reconsider, writing about Shire that: "This man is still young and full of life. It is a pity that he has been sent over here without one of his wives". The protectorate governor rejected this suggestion on the grounds that keeping the Sultan in exile was already costing the authorities R.100 per month. He also suggested that the Sultan could "secure the services of a boy who can be both cook and attendant if he wishes to do so at our expense". Shire was dissatisfied with this compromise, and petitioned instead for what he termed "a respectable woman".

== Return to the Somaliland Protectorate ==
Queen Elizabeth II formally presenting Sultan Mohamoud Ali Shirreh his honors (Aden, 1954)

In May 1928, after some lobbying on Shire's behalf by Governor Byrne, Shire's period of exile in the Seychelles came to an end. He was transported to Aden on board the SS Karapara. Shire returned to the Somaliland Protectorate, promising unwavering loyalty to the government and future good behavior. He still commanded the loyalty of his people. Gradually, Shire reached an accommodation with the British administration. The colonial authorities recognized the influence that he could exert over his clan, and his Sultan status was eventually restored.

Shire was later featured on the cover of History Today, appearing in a 1960 issue of the monthly illustrated history magazine.

In 1960s, he died peacefully during his sleep.

== See also ==
- Yusuf Ali Kenadid
- Ali Yusuf Kenadid
- Majeerteen Sultanate
- Osman Mahamuud
- Sultanate of Hobyo
