= Yusuf Ali Kenadid =

Sultan of Hobyo (r. 1878–1911)

Yusuf Ali Kenadid Yuusuf Cali Keenadiid
- Sultan; Lord of Alula
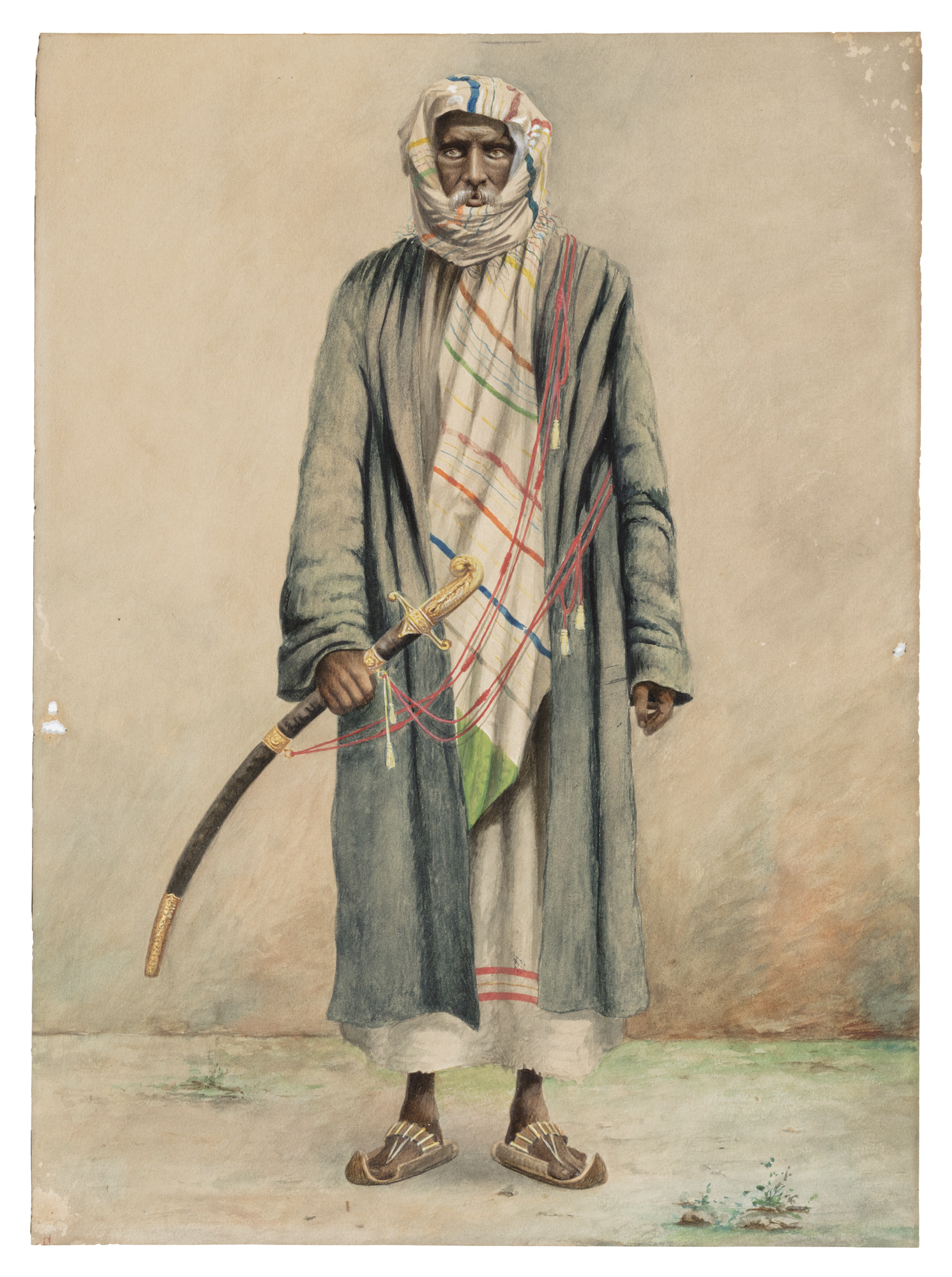

1st Sultan of Hobyo
- Reign: April 1878 – 28 September 1911
- Predecessor: Monarchy established
- Successor: Ali Yusuf Kenadid (prince)
- Born: 1837; Alula, Majeerteen Sultanate
- Died: 1911 (aged 73–74); Hobyo, Hobyo Sultanate
- Spouse: Khadija Mohammed Hassan, Dahabo Islaan Aadan, Khadija, Awrala, Faduumo
- Issue: Ali Yusuf Kenadid, (prince Ali Yusuf); Osman Yusuf Kenadid, Muse Yusuf Kenadid, Mohammed Yusuf Kenadid, Asha Yusuf Kenadid, Mumina Yusuf Kenadid, Ahmed Yusuf Kenadiid
- Religion: Islam

Yusuf Ali Kenadid (Somali: Yuusuf Cali Keenadiid; 1837 – 14 August 1911) was a Somali Sultan and the founder of the Sultanate of Hobyo. He was succeeded to the throne by his son Ali Yusuf Kenadid.

== Biography ==
Yusuf Ali Kenadid was born into the Bah Yaaqub (part of the larger Bah Dirooble) branch of the Osman Mahamuud, Majeerteen Darod family. He is the father of Osman Yusuf Kenadid, who would go on to create the Osmanya writing script for the Somali language. Yusuf Ali's grandson, Yasin Osman Kenadid, later helped found the Society for Somali Language and Literature.

Yusuf Ali was not a lineal descendant of the previous dynasties that governed over northeastern Somalia. He independently amassed his own fortune, and would later evolve into a skilled military leader commanding more senior troops. "Kenadid" was not his surname, but rather a title given to him by his rivals. It means "He who refuses to be Haltered".

Yusuf Ali's son, Ali Yusuf, succeeded him as Sultan of Hobyo.

== Reign ==
The sultanate of Hobyo originated from a rift within the Majeerteen Sultanate. The election of Yusuf Ali as Sultan by Bah Lelkase and Bah Yaqub in Alula (which from the time of Boqor Xawaadane had been designated as the residence of the Bah Yaqubs) was the origin of a dynastic conflict.

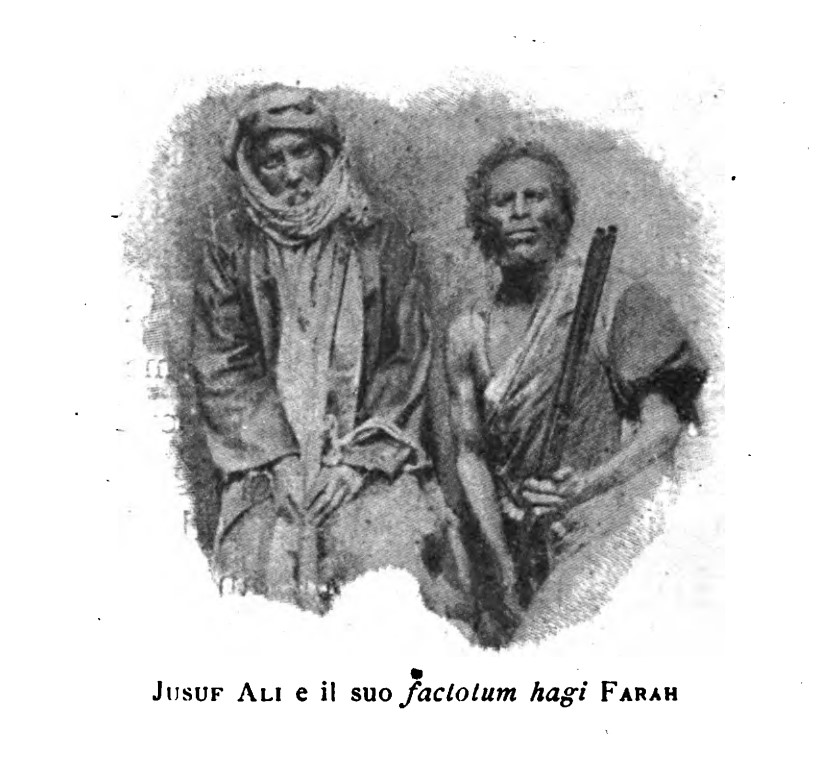
Yusuf Ali Kenadiid and Naib (Governor) Xaaji Faaraax in 1890

Initially, Yusuf Ali Kenadiid’s goal was to seize control of the neighboring Majeerteen Sultanate, which was then ruled by his cousin and rival, Boqor Osman Mahamud. However, he was unsuccessful in this endeavour, and was eventually forced into exile in Yemen. A decade later, in the 1870s, Kenadid returned from the Arabian Peninsula with a band of Hadhrami led by Husni Al Kathiri and with their assistance, he managed to overpower the local Habar Gidir clans in Mudug, and established the Sultanate of Hobyo in 1878.

=== Hobyo-Italian protectorate treaty ===
After consolidating his power in Hobyo, to protect himself from further Zanzibari hostility, he signed a protectorate treaty with Italy, still a power present only nominally. In fact, asking for protection from the English, already firmly established in 'Aden and Berbera, would have meant limiting one's autonomy and therefore one's ambitions. The Italian authorities were also informed by Yusuf Ali himself from the first contacts for the establishment of the protectorate. However, there was no direct intervention and this was probably the demonstration that the choice of Italy as protector could be the most congenial precisely because it was unable to intervene in the internal affairs of the Sultanate. And that was probably the reason why Keenadiid was able to later convince the more reluctant Boqor Cismaan to also accept the Italian protective umbrella over the Sultanate in Bari. Italian protection would play a very important role in the expansion of the Sultanate towards the interior. In 1889, when the protectorate agreement was signed, the sultanal power was only consolidated on a limited stretch of the coast: the agreement, on the other hand, recognized him as sovereign between Ras Awath (Cabaad), to the north, up to in Mereeg at noon, then the entire outlet to the sea of the Habar Gidir region. Instead, the northern part of Mudug, Cumar Maxamuud, was initially excluded from the agreement, including the Abgaal-Waceesle area of Mereeg which as we will see will be the source of subsequent conflicts. This protective umbrella was a guarantee from the interventions of other external powers among them Germany - but the expansion of the sovereignty of the Sultanate inwards was a personal initiative of the Sultan.

The terms of each treaty specified that Italy was to steer clear of any interference in the sultanates' respective administrations. In return for Italian arms and an annual subsidy, the Sultans conceded to a minimum of oversight and economic concessions. The Italians also agreed to dispatch a few ambassadors to promote both the sultanates' and their own interests.

== Exile ==
The relationship between the Hobyo Sultanate and the Kingdom of Italy soured when Sultan Kenadid refused the Italians proposal to allow a British contingent of troops to disembark in his Sultanate so that they might then pursue their battle against Diiriye Guure and his emir Mohammed Abdullah Hassan's of the Dervish Movement. Viewed as too much of a threat by the Italians, Sultan Kenadid was eventually exiled to Aden in Yemen and then to Italian Eritrea, as was his son Ali Yusuf, the heir apparent to his throne.

=== Ali Suji ===
According to Angus Hamilton, Cali Xaaji Axmed Aaden Suji was the highest ranked commander in the Dervish ranks in 1903, calling Ali Suji the dervish "first lieutenant". Angus also states that due to ALi Suji's high rank, Yusuf Ali Kenadid targeted Ali Suji rather than the Mullah:

In this it seemed that the flocks and herds of Yusuf Ali were the object of the Mullah’s attacks, so, by way of reprisals, the followers of the old Sheikh retaliated on the camels of the Mullah’s first lieutenant, Ali Suji. As a rule Somali raids are bloodless encounters, since it is contrary to the principle of Somali warfare to take life. The maxim of the tribesmen is: “ Covet your neighbour’s wife; seize his ox or his ass or camel; wreck his happy home generally; but avoid bloodshed.”

Although in the early 1903 Ali Suji headed the dervish army, prior to the Ruuga battle he headed Dervish cavalry:

Cali Xaaji Axmed Aaden oo ay Sayidka habrawadaag ahaayeen, Cali waxaa dhasay Balax Seed Magan, Sayidkana hooyadii waxaa la oron jiray Carro Seed Magan. Waxaa la yiri dagaalkii Ruuga ee Koofil ayaa lagu dilay Cali Xaaji Axmed oo fardaha Daraawiisheed buu madax ka ahaa, markii dagaalka foodda la is geliyey asaan wali la isu jilib dhigin, ayaa gaalkii girligaan Daraawiishta ku afuufay

Translation:

Ali Haji Ahmed Aden who was the Sayid's maternal cousin, Ali was birthed by Balah Seed Magan, whilst the Sayid's mother was called Arro Seed Magan. It was said that in the fight of Ruuga (Dul Madoba) wherein Corfield was killed and where Ali Ahmed Suji was head of the Dervish cavalry, that once the fight was on the horizon yet not yet underway the colonizers machine gunned the Dervishes with an automatic firearm

== See also ==
- Osman Mahamuud
- Sultanate of Hobyo
- Osman Yusuf Kenadid
- Ali Yusuf Kenadiid
