= Yasin Osman Kenadid =

Somali linguist, author, educator, and government official

Yasin Osmaan Kenadid ياسين عثمان كينايديض
- Born: 1919; Hobyo, Somalia
- Died: 27 November 1988 (aged 68–69); Rome, Italy
- Occupations: Writer, political activist

Yasin Osman Kenadid (Somali: Yaasiin Cismaan Keenadiid, Arabic: ياسين عثمان كينايديض) (1919–27 November 1988) was a Somali intellectual, writer and linguist. He was an influential literary scholar, having written a seminal dictionary of the Somali language.

== Family and name ==
Yasin was a member of the Kenadid family. He is related to Ali Yusuf Kenadid, the second Sultan of the Sultanate of Hobyo. His father, Osman Yusuf Kenadid, was the brother of Ali Yusuf and the creator of the Osmanya script.

== Biography ==
Kenadid was born in Hobyo (Obbia), Somalia during 1919. He attended a Quranic school until he was fifteen. He then move to Mogadishu, attending both Italian and Arabic schools where he learned English.

Kenadid helped found the Society for Somali Language and Literature. He is also one of the thirteen founders of the Somali Youth League (SYL) and was member of the National Somali Language Committee that decided on the standard spelling of modern Somali.

== Works ==
Kenadid's best-known book is the dictionary that was the only standard Somali dictionary for decades:

- Qaamuuska Af-Soomaaliga, 1976 Mogadishu/Firenze, Wasaradda Hiddaha iyo Taclinta Sare,

Akademyaha Dhaqanqa.

He is also known as an influential literary scholar:

- 1984 Ina Abdille Hassan and his literary activity, Naples, Istituto Universitario Orientale
