= Ali Yusuf Kenadid =

Sultan of Hobyo (r. early 1900s–1925)

Ali Yusuf Kenadid علي يوسف كينيديد
- Sultan
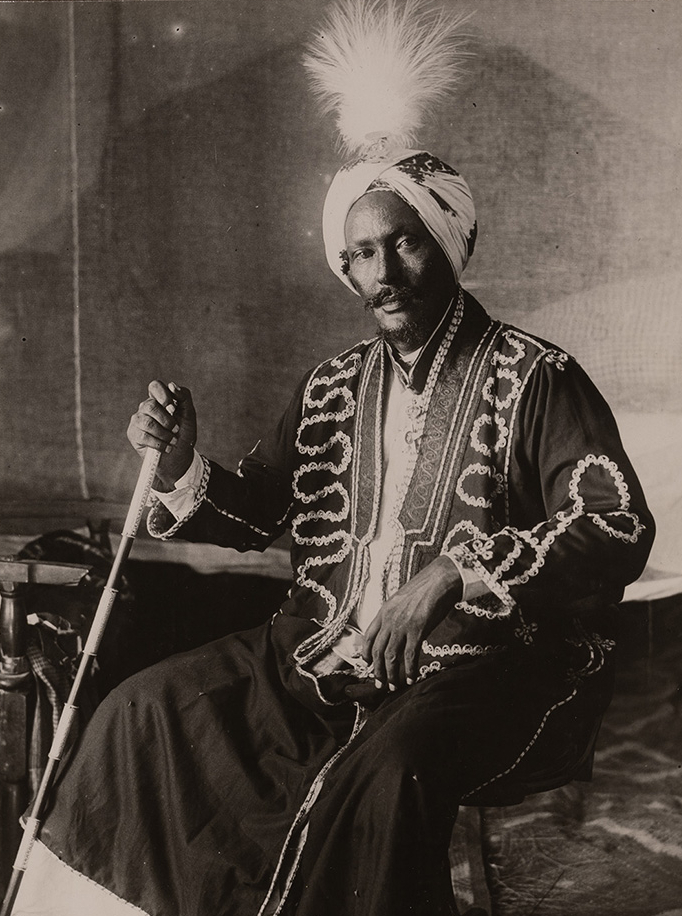
- Portrait of Ali Yusuf Kenadid

2nd Sultan of Hobyo
- Reign: 28 September 1911–1925
- Coronation: 5 October
- Predecessor: Yusuf Ali Kenadid
- Successor: Monarchy abolished
- Died: 1936; Mogadishu
Names
- Ali Yusuf Ali
- Father: Yusuf Ali Kenadid
- Religion: Islam

Ali Yusuf Kenadid (Somali: Cali Yuusuf Keenadiid, Arabic: علي يوسف كينيديد; died 1927) was a Majeerteen Sultan and the second ruler of the Sultanate of Hobyo.

== History ==
Ali Yusuf was born into a Majeerteen Darod family. His father, Sultan Yusuf Ali Kenadid, was the founder of the Sultanate of Hobyo centered in present-day northeastern and central Somalia. The polity was established in the 1870s on territory carved out of the ruling Majeerteen Sultanate (Migiurtinia). Ali Yusuf's brother, Osman Yusuf Kenadid, would go on to invent the Osmanya writing script for the Somali language.

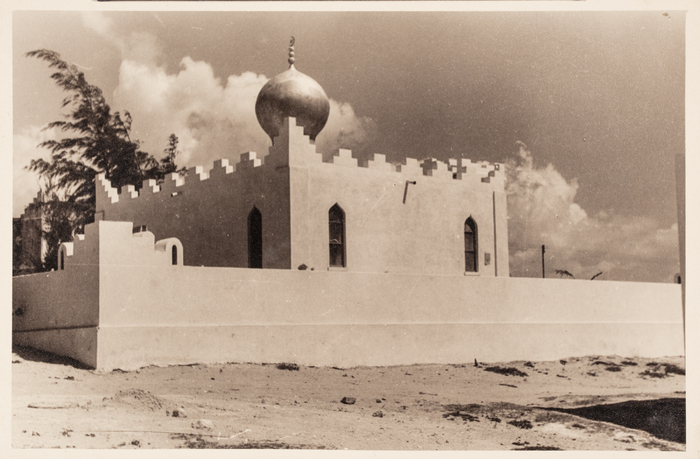
Tomb of Sultan Ali Yusuf, Sultan of Hobyo.

In an attempt to advance his own expansionist objectives, Kenadid père in late 1888 entered into a treaty with the Italians, making his realm an Italian protectorate. The terms of the agreement specified that Italy was to steer clear of any interference in the sultanate's administration.

However, the relationship between Hobyo and Italy soured when the elder Kenadid refused the Italians' proposal to allow a British contingent of troops to disembark in his Sultanate so that they might then pursue their battle against the Dhulbahante garad and Darawiish monarch Diiriye Guure and his emir, Mohammed Abdullah Hassan's Dervish forces.

== See also ==
- Osman Mahamuud
- Osman Yusuf Kenadid
- Mohamoud Ali Shire
