= Somali aristocratic and court titles =

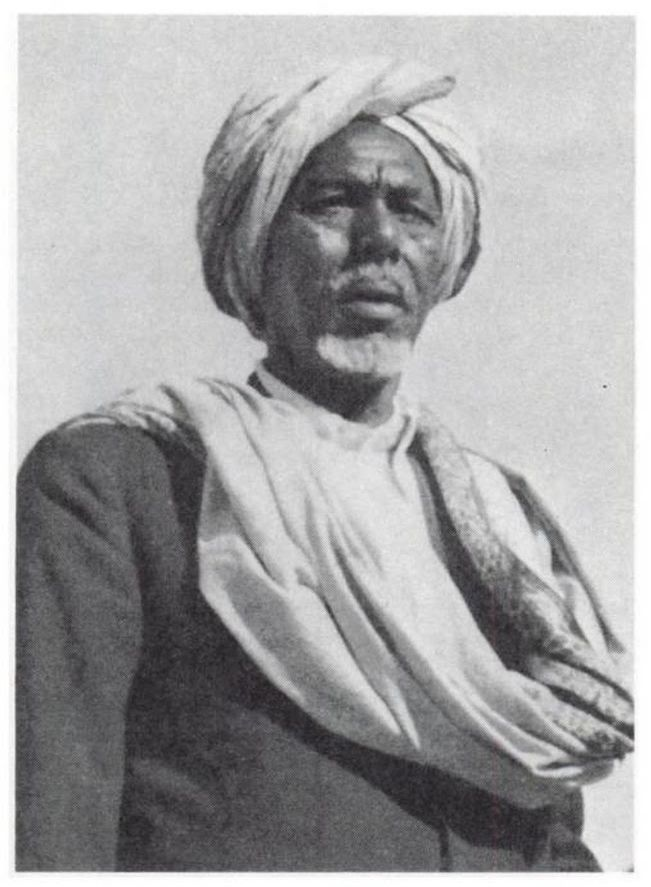
Suldaan Abdillahi Suldaan Deria, the 5th Grand Sultan of the Isaaq Sultanate

This is a list of Somali aristocratic and court titles that were historically used by the Somali people's various sultanates, kingdoms and empires. Also included are the honorifics reserved for Islamic notables as well as traditional leaders and officials within Somali customary law (xeer), in addition to the nobiliary particles set aside for distinguished individuals.

== Monarchs and aristocrats ==
Below is a list of the royal court titles historically retained by the Somali monarchies and aristocracies.

=== Male titles ===
==== Kings or Rulers ====
- Suldaan: From the Arabic for Sultan or English "Ruler". Very common title for rulers in the pre-colonial and colonial periods; used throughout the Somali territories, particularly by the Isaaq. Famous Sultans include Fakr ad-Din, the first Sultan of the Sultanate of Mogadishu, who built the 13th-century Fakr ad-Din Mosque; Nur Ahmed Aman, 5th Sultan of the Habr Yunis and one of the founders of the Dervish state; Sultan Abdillahi Deria of the Isaaq Sultanate, who was an anti-colonial figure in the mid-20th century; Sultan Mohamoud Ali Shire of the Warsangali, would change the court title of the Warsangeli Sultanate from Gerad to Sultan after taking lo over the reign from his ailing father. Yusuf Ali Kenadid, founder of the Sultanate of Hobyo; and Ibrahim Adeer, founder of the Geledi Sultanate. The title, Suldaan was used by the influential Ajuran Sultanate that ruled large parts of East Africa form14th-century to 17th. The Ajuran Sultanate center of power was the House of Garen. Suldaan Olol Dinle was the last of Ajuran Dynasty that ruled the Shabelle Zone.

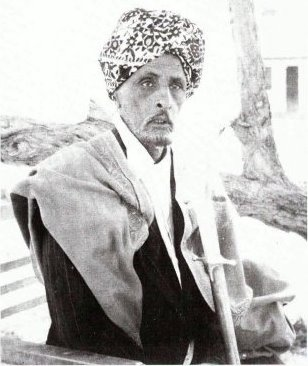
Mohamoud Ali Shire Suldaan (Sultan) of the Warsangali

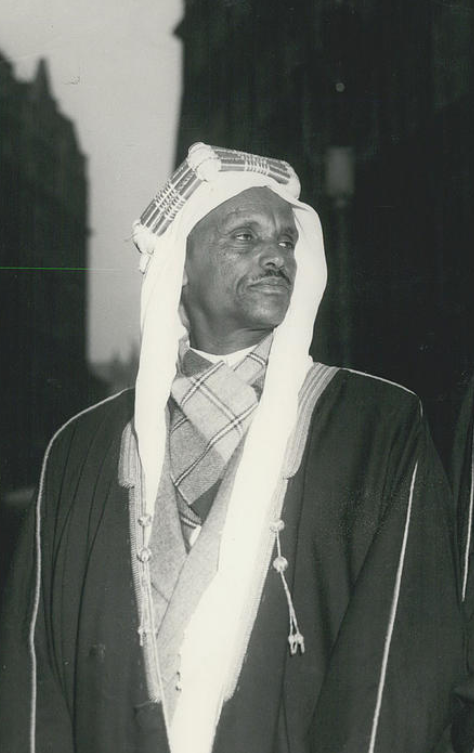
Suldaan Abdulrahman Gaarad Deria, 1st Sultan & 5th leader of the Habr Awal

- Ughaz: Authentic Somali term for "Sultan". Used throughout the northern and western Somali territories; particularly in the Somali region of Ethiopia and Somaliland, but also in central Somalia, southern and northeastern Somalia. The Gadabursi, Gaalje'el and Deshiishe gave their sultan the title of "Ugaas" romanized as "Ughaz".
- Boqor: Literally denotes King. However, in practice, it is the primus inter pares or "King of Kings". The title is etymologically derived from one of the Afro-Asiatic Somali language terms for "belt", in recognition of the official's unifying role within society. According to Kobishchanow (1987), Boqor is also related to the style Paqar, which was employed by rulers in the early Nile Valley state of Meroe. Various Somali honorifics and designations have Boqor as their root. The latter include Boqortooyo, signifying "monarchy", "kingdom" or "empire"; Boqornimo, meaning "royalty", "nobility" or "dignitaries"; and Boqortinnimo, denoting "kingship". Historically, the title was mainly used by rulers in the northeastern Puntland region of Somalia. The most prominent Boqors in recent times were Osman Mahamuud, who governed the Majeerteen Sultanate (Majeerteenia) during its 19th-century heyday, as well as Osman Aw Mohamud (Buurmadow) of the Habr Je'lo Isaaqs. Also used among the Gadabuursi as the law of the King and the 100 men' (heerka boqorka iyo boqolka nin).
- Garaad: Often employed interchangeably with "Suldaan" to denote a Sultan. Etymologically signifies "wisdom", "mind" or "understanding". According to Basset (1952), the title corresponds with the honorific Al-Jaraad, which was used during the Middle Ages by Muslim governors in the Islamic parts of Ethiopia. Gerad was historically employed throughout Somaliland by the Tol Je'lo as well as the Habr Yonis until the clan's leadership adopted a Suldaan in the 20th century. It is still used by the Dhulbahante today. Garad also denotes a "chief" in Harari and Silt'e languages respectively.
- Imaam: Denotes the Head of State. Style was used especially by rulers Of hawiye Clans in the Sultanate of Adal, Imamate Of Hiraab and the Ajuran Sultanate. Notable Imams include Ahmad ibn Ibrahim al-Ghazi, also known as Ahmed Gurey or Gran (both meaning "the Left Handed"), who led a military campaign during the Middle Ages known as the Conquest of Abyssinia (Futuh al-Habash). Imam Yacquub who led the Inmate Of hiraab is one of famous imam in Horn of Africa.
- Emir: Used by leaders in the Adal Sultanate. Also employed by commanders in the Ajuran Sultanate's armed forces and navy. Prominent Emirs include Nur ibn Mujahid, the Emir of Harar who built the great wall (Jugol) around the city.

==== Royal family ====
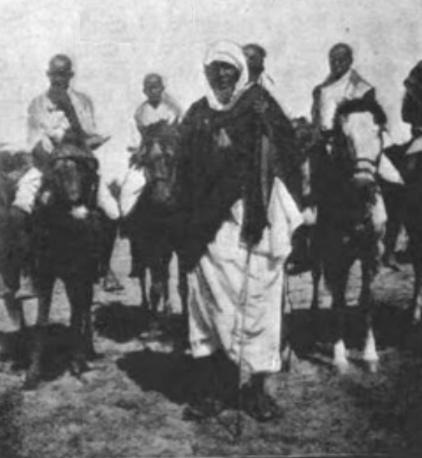
Gadabuursi Ughaz Nur near the age of 80

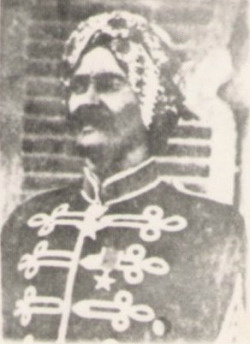
Suldaan Ali Yusuf Kenadid of the Sultanate of Hobyo.

- Amiir: Prince. Honorific set aside for the hereditary son of the King or Sultan. Notable Princes include Dolal Nur of the Rer Ainanshe, the son and heir of Sultan Nur Ahmed Aman.
- Ina Boqor: Alternate court style for the Prince. A term used by Ajuran Empire and a powerful Ajuran princess called Faduma Sarjelle

==== Court officials ====
- Wasiir: Minister and/or tax and revenue collector. Title used in the northern Majeerteen Sultanate and Sultanate of Hobyo, as well as the southern Ajuran Sultanate. Wazirs were also quite common at the royal court of the medieval Sultanate of Mogadishu. When the Moroccan traveller Ibn Battuta visited Mogadishu in 1331, he indicated that the city was ruled by a Somali sultan of Barbara origin, who had a retinue of wazirs, legal experts, commanders, royal eunuchs, and other officials at his service. Other notable wazirs include the maternal grandfather of the Somali General Abdullahi Ahmed Irro, who was part of the Sultanate of Hobyo's aristocratic contingent in the southern town of Kismayo.
- Boqortiishe: Viceroy. Style reserved for court officials governing territory on behalf of their Kingdom was mostly used by Ajuran Empire that established many colonies and a famous ruler was Abd al-Aziz of Mogadishu who ruled Maldive islands on behalf of Ajuran Empire
- Wakiil-Boqor: Alternate court title designating a Viceroy.
- Na'ib/Naïb: Deputy or representative of the Sultan. Duties included the administration of tribute, which was collected by court soldiers. Style was used in the Ajuran Sultanate, Majeerteen Sultanate and Sultanate of Hobyo.
- Qaadi: Denotes a Chief Judge. Especially common title in Somaliland, but also used in the southern Ajuran Sultanate. Prominent Qadis include Ismail ibn Ash-Shaykh Ishaaq, the ancestor of the Garhajis clan, Abd al Aziz al-Amawi, an influential 19th-century diplomat, historian, poet, jurist and scholar who was appointed Qadi of the Kilwa Sultanate at the age of 18 by Muscat and Oman's Sultan Said bin Sultan; and the father of Sheikh Abdurahman Sheikh Nuur, inventor of the Borama script for the Somali language.

=== Female titles ===
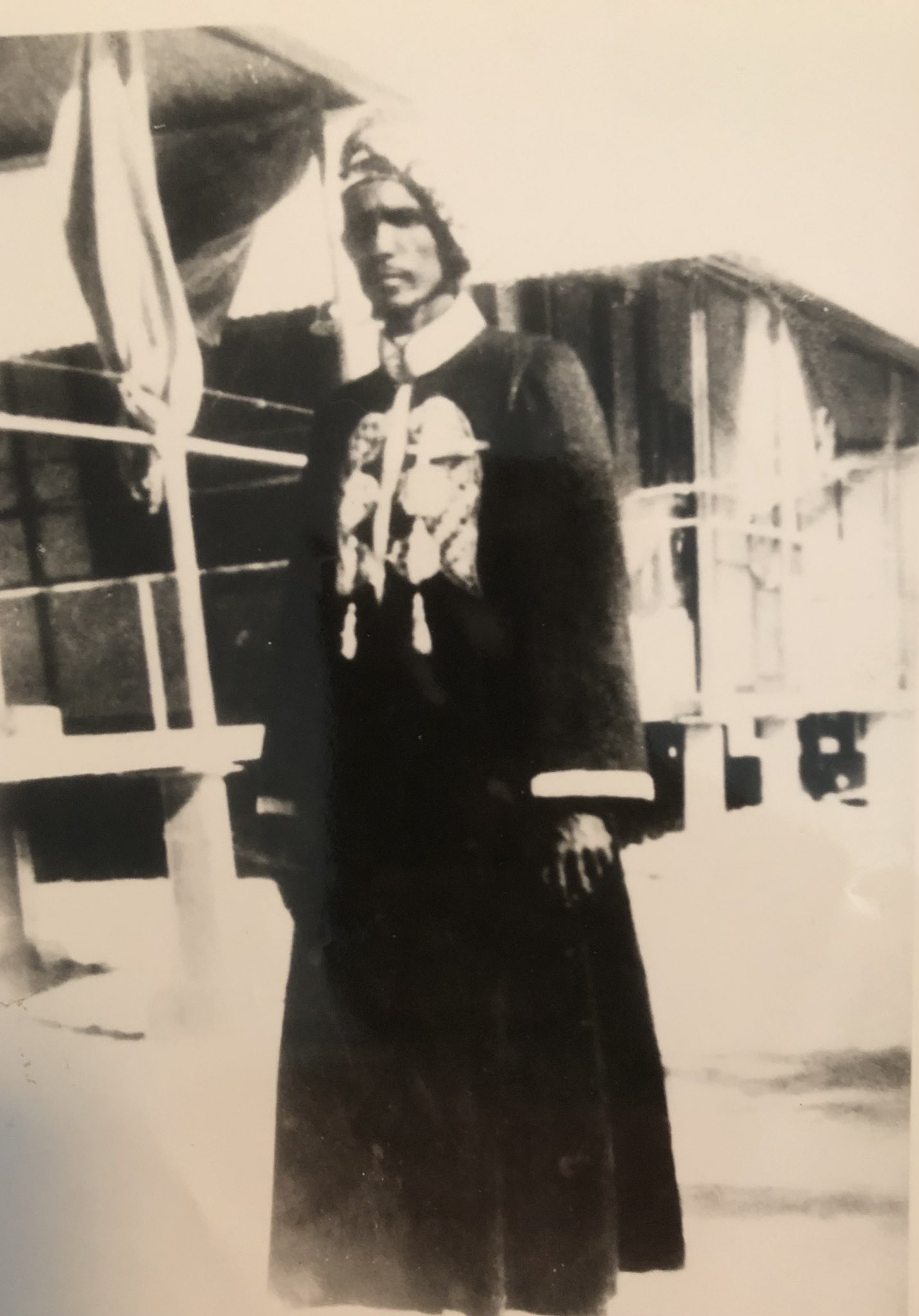
Suldaan Olol Dinle of Ajuran Sultanate in Shabelle Zone

==== Consorts ====
- Boqorad: Literally translates as "Queen". Title mainly reserved for the queen consort of the King (Boqor).

==== Royal family ====
- Amiirad: Princess. Honorific set aside for the hereditary daughter of the King or Sultan.
- Ina Boqor: Alternate court style for the Prince or Princess.

== Religious leaders ==
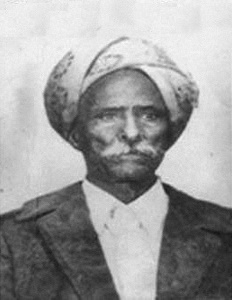
Sheikh Ali Ayanle Samatar, a prominent Islamic leader.

Islamic leaders within Somali society were often drawn from or elevated to the noble ranks. Below is a list of the titles most often used historically by the clergymen (ulama):

- Sheekh: Honorific for senior Muslim clerics (wadaad). Often abbreviated to "Sh". Famous Sheikhs include Abdirahman bin Isma'il al-Jabarti, an early Muslim leader in northern Somalia; Abadir Umar Ar-Rida, the patron saint of Harar; Abd al-Rahman al-Jabarti, Sheikh of the riwaq in Cairo who recorded the Napoleonic invasion of Egypt; Abd Al-Rahman bin Ahmad al-Zayla'i, scholar who played a crucial role in the spread of the Qadiriyya movement in Somalia and East Africa; Shaykh Sufi, 19th-century scholar, poet, reformist and astrologist who authored Shadjarat al-Yakim ("The Tree of Certitude"); Abdallah al-Qutbi, polemicist, theologian and philosopher best known for his five-part Al-Majmu'at al-mubaraka ("The Blessed Collection"); and Muhammad As-Sūmālī, teacher in the Masjid al-Haram in Mecca who influenced many of the prominent Islamic scholars of today.
- Sayyid: Title of high honour meaning "Lord" or "Master". Denotes males accepted as descendants of the Islamic prophet Muhammad through his grandsons, Hasan ibn Ali and Hussein ibn Ali, sons of the prophet's daughter Fatima Zahra and his son-in-law Ali ibn Abi Talib. Used by leaders in the Dervish State; notably by Mohammed Abdullah Hassan ("Mad Mullah").
- Shariif (pl. Ashraaf): Historically used to distinguish descendants of Hassan 'Ali Abuu Taalib (Hasan ibn Ali). Often reserved for early Islamic leaders such as Sharif Yusuf Barkhadle (popularly known as Aw Barkhadle or the "Blessed Father"), a man described as "the most outstanding saint in northern Somalia". Sharif Aydurus was also a notable Sharif and Somali scholar from Mogadishu.
- Xaaji: Honorific reserved for distinguished individuals who have performed the hajj, or pilgrimage to the holy city of Mecca.

== Traditional leaders and officials ==
Below is a list of the titles traditionally employed by leaders and officials within the Somali customary law or xeer.

=== Leaders ===
- Islan: Clan chief. Title evolved after the fragmentation in the 18th century of the great Harti confederation that dominated the northeastern Horn region since at least the 14th century. A general process of decentralization ensued, with new leaders known as Islaan assuming at the local level some of the power that was previously solely commanded by the Sultan of Majeerteenia, the titular head of the entire confederation. Although they nominally asserted independence from the sultanate, Islaan's mainly wielded religious rather than political authority.
- Malak: Signifies "Chief". Historically used mainly by the Rahanweyn clan that today forms one of the largest constituencies in southern Somalia, in addition to a few sympatric clans. Usually assigned to the Herabow sub-lineage, from which two male constituents were selected to manage the group's military affairs.
- Akil: From the Arabic for "wise man". A common title for male elders, who are the traditional clan chiefs. Used particularly in Somaliland.

=== Officials ===
- Oday (pl. Odayaal): Literally "elder". The most common title for advisors to the clan head or judges in xeer hearings. Used throughout the Somali territories.
- Heer begti or Heer boggeyal: Jurists or legal experts in xeer.
- Gurtiyal: Detectives.
- Garhajiyal: Attorneys in xeer cases.
- Murkhatiyal: Witnesses in official xeer proceedings.
- Waranle: Police officers to enforce the customary law.

== Nobiliary particles ==
- Aw: Nobiliary particle meaning "honorable", "venerable", or simply "Sir". Reserved for learned Islamic clerics, and used throughout the Somali territories. During his research in the ancient town of Amud, the historian G.W.B. Huntingford noticed that whenever an old site had the prefix Aw in its name (such as the ruins of Awbare and Awbube), it denoted the final resting place of a local saint. Similarly, the ancient island of Aw Garweyne on the southeastern Benadir littoral was named for the late Sheikh 'Ismaan, whose tomb is found there. Surveys by A.T. Curle in 1934 on several of these important ruined cities recovered various artefacts, such as pottery and coins, which point to a medieval period of activity at the tail end of the Sultanate of Adal's reign. Somaliland and northeastern Somalia in general is home to numerous such archaeological sites, with similar edifices found at Haylan, Qa’ableh, Macajilayn, Booco, Qombo'ul, El Ayo, Heis, Botiala, Salweyn, Mudun, Abasa, Maduna, Gelweita and Damo, among other areas.

== See also ==
- Maritime history of Somalia
- Somali architecture
- Ethiopian aristocratic and court titles
