= Osman Mohamoud (king) =

Sultan of Majeerteen (r. 1860–1927)

Boqor Osman Boqor Mahamuud عثمان محمود
- Boqor, Sultan
- Photograph of Osman Mohamoud

Sultan of Majeerteen
- Reign: 1860–1927
- Predecessor: Mahmud V ibn Yusuf
- Successor: Monarchy abolished
- Issue: Hersi Boqor,
Names
- Cismaan Maxamuud
- Religion: Islam

Osman Mahamuud II (Somali: Cismaan Maxamuud, Arabic: عثمان محمود), also known as Uthman III ibn Mahmud, was a Somali king. He led the Majeerteen Sultanate as its most famous and influential leader, during the late 19th century, and early 20th century.

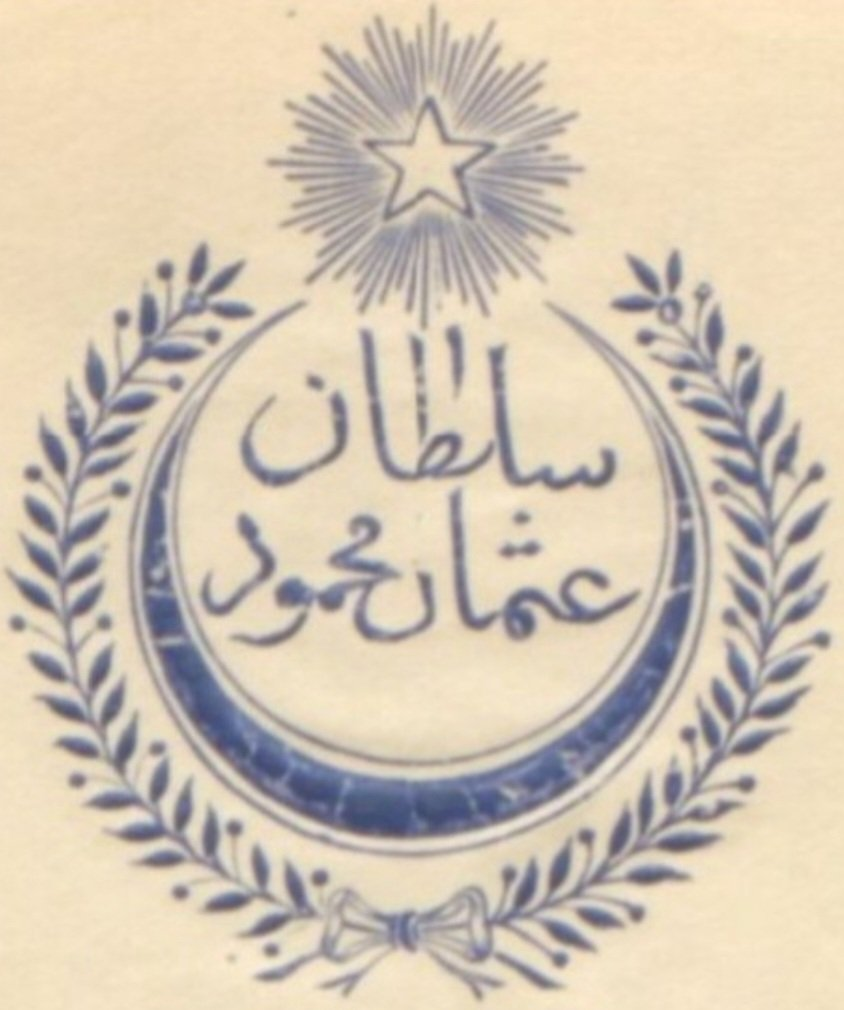
Royal crest of Osman Mahamud II

== Reign ==
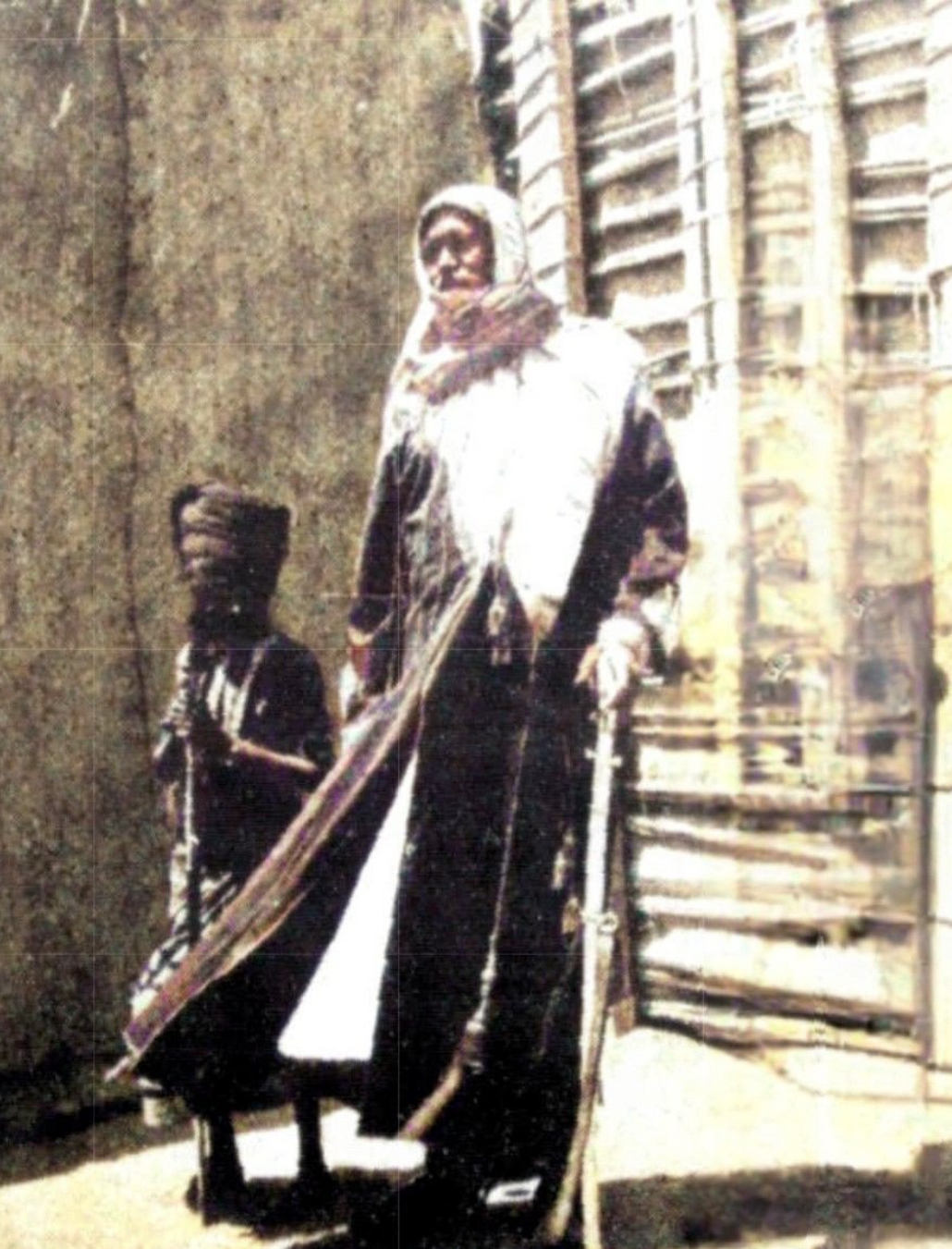
Boqor Osman's standing alongside his son in 1911

The Majeerteen Sultanate was established by Somalis from the Majeerteen Darod clan. Osman Mahamuud was the son of Mahmud V ibn Yusuf, who had ruled the Sultanate from 1844 to 1860. Mahmud fils thereafter assumed the throne, governing under the regal title of Boqor (King). The Majeerteen Sultanate rose to prominence that century under Boqor Osman's guidance.

=== War with Yusuf Ali Kenadid and the Sultanate of Hobyo ===
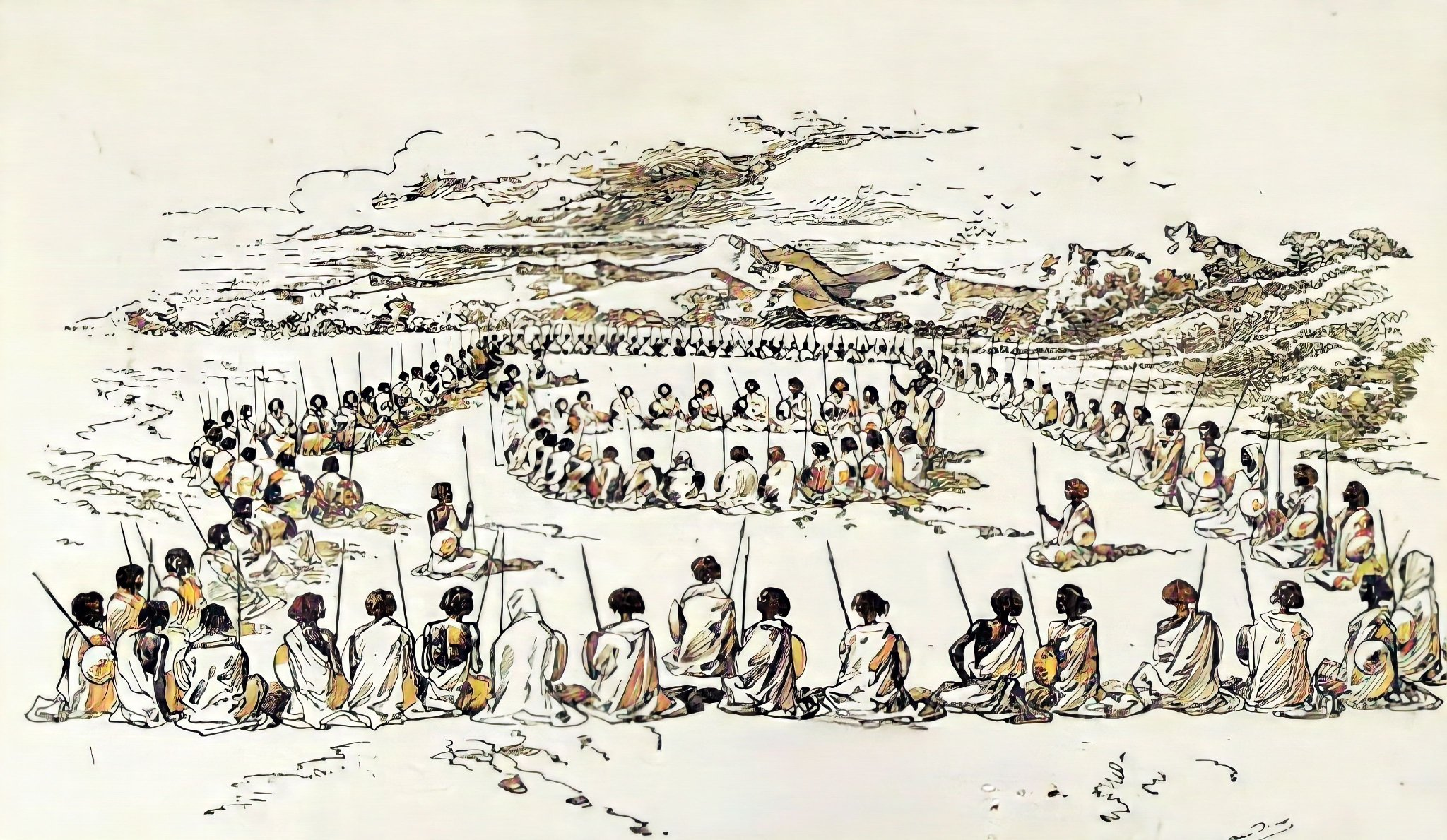
Majeerteen soldiers loyal to Boqor Osman have a meeting, in preparation of war

Osman Mahamuud's Kingdom was under attack in the mid-19th century due to a power struggle between himself and his ambitious cousin, Yusuf Ali Kenadid. After almost five years of battle, the young upstart was terribly defeated and Kenadiid was finally forced into exile in Yemen. A decade later, in the 1870s, Kenadid returned from the Arabian Peninsula with a band of Hadhrami musketeers and a group of devoted lieutenants. With their assistance he managed to break away from Majeerteenia, then overpower the local Habar Gidir in Mudug, and establish the separate Sultanate of Hobyo in 1878.

== Early contact with Europeans ==
Due to consistent ship crashes along the northeastern Cape Guardafui headland, Boqor Osman's kingdom entered into an informal agreement with Britain, wherein the British agreed to pay the King annual subsidies to protect shipwrecked British crews and guard wrecks against plunder. The agreement, however, remained unratified, as the British feared that doing so would "give other powers a precedent for making agreements with the Somalis, who seemed ready to enter into relations with all comers."

In the late 19th century, most of the Somali monarchs entered into treaties with one of the colonial powers, Britain or Italy. In late 1889, Boqor Osman entered into a treaty with the Italians, making his realm an Italian protectorate. His rival, Sultan Yusuf Ali Kenadid had signed a similar agreement in regards with his own Sultanate the year before. Both rulers had signed the protectorate treaties to exploit the objectives of the Kingdom Of Italy with their own expansionist objectives, alongside effectively insuring the continued independence of their territories. With Boqor Osman looking to use Italy's support in his ongoing power struggle with Kenadid over the territorial disputes, especially the Nugaal region.

The terms of each treaty specified that Italy was to steer clear of any interference in the sultanates' respective administrations. In return for Italian arms and an annual subsidy, the Sultans conceded to a minimum of oversight and economic concessions. The Italians also agreed to dispatch a few ambassadors to promote both the sultanates' and their own interests.

== See also ==
- Majeerteen Sultanate
- Sultanate of Hobyo
- Yusuf Ali Kenadid
- Ali Yusuf Kenadid
- Mohamoud Ali Shire
- Somali aristocratic and court titles
- Osman Mahmoud
- Omar Mahamoud
