= Bareeda District =

Bareeda
- District
- Interactive map of Bareeda
- Coordinates: 11°52′14″N 51°03′28″E
- Country: Somalia; Puntland
- Region: Ras Aseir
- Time zone: UTC+3 (EAT)

Bareeda District is a district in the northeastern Ras Aseir region of Puntland.
