= El Hur =

Ceel Huur (El Hur)
- Town
- Location in Somalia
- Coordinates: 5°0′0″N 48°16′0″E
- Country: Somalia: Galmudug
- Region: Mudug
- Time zone: UTC+3 (East Africa Time)

El Hur (Somali: Ceel Huur) is a village in Galmudug state located in Hobyo District and south of Hobyo, in the north-central Mudug region of Somalia.
