= Sultanate of Hobyo =

1878–1927 Somali kingdom

Sultanate of Hobyo 𐒈𐒚𐒐𐒆𐒖𐒒𐒖𐒊𐒖 𐒔𐒙𐒁𐒕𐒙 (Somali) Suldanadda Hobyo (Somali) سلطنة هوبيو (Arabic)
- 1870s/1884–1927
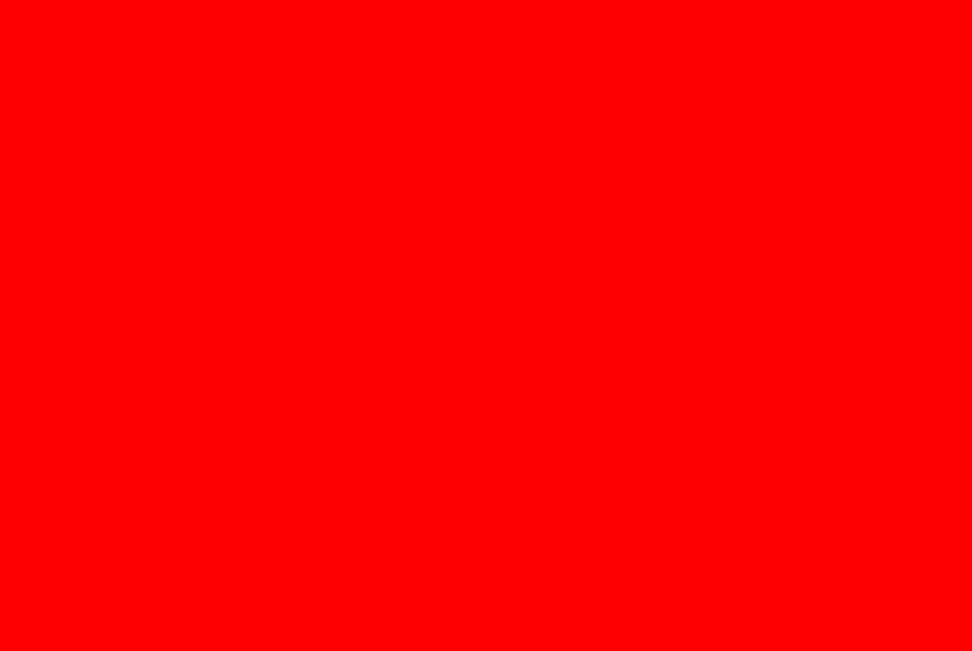
- Flag Coat of arms

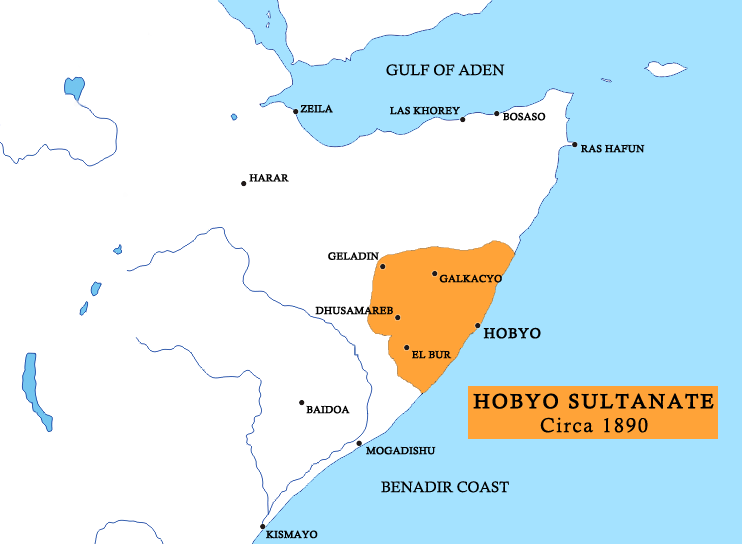
- The Sultanate of Hobyo in the late 19th century
- Status: Somali Sultanate Sovereign until 1889; Protectorate of Italy (1889–1927)
- Capital: Hobyo
- Common languages: Somali · Arabic
- Religion: Islam
- Government: Monarchy
- Sultan
  - 1854–1912: Yusuf Ali Kenadid
  - early 1912–1925: Ali Yusuf Kenadid
- History
  - Yusuf Ali Kenadids war with the Majeerteen Sultanate and establishment: 1870s or 1884 1870s/1884
  - Protectorate treaty with the Kingdom of Italy: 8 February 1889
  - Campaign of the Sultanates and disintegration of the Sultanate of Hobyo: 1927
Preceded by	Succeeded by
Majeerteen Sultanate; Hiraab Imamate	Italian Somaliland
- Today part of: Somalia

The Sultanate of Hobyo (Somali: Saldanadda Hobyo, Arabic: سلطنة هوبيو), also known as the Sultanate of Obbia, was a 19th-century Somali Sultanate in present-day central and northeastern Somalia, and eastern Ethiopia. It was established between the 1870s and 1884 by Yusuf Ali Kenadid. In 1889, it became a protectorate of Italy and was eventually after the Campaign of the Sultanates, integrated into the colony of Italian Somaliland in 1927.

== Administration ==
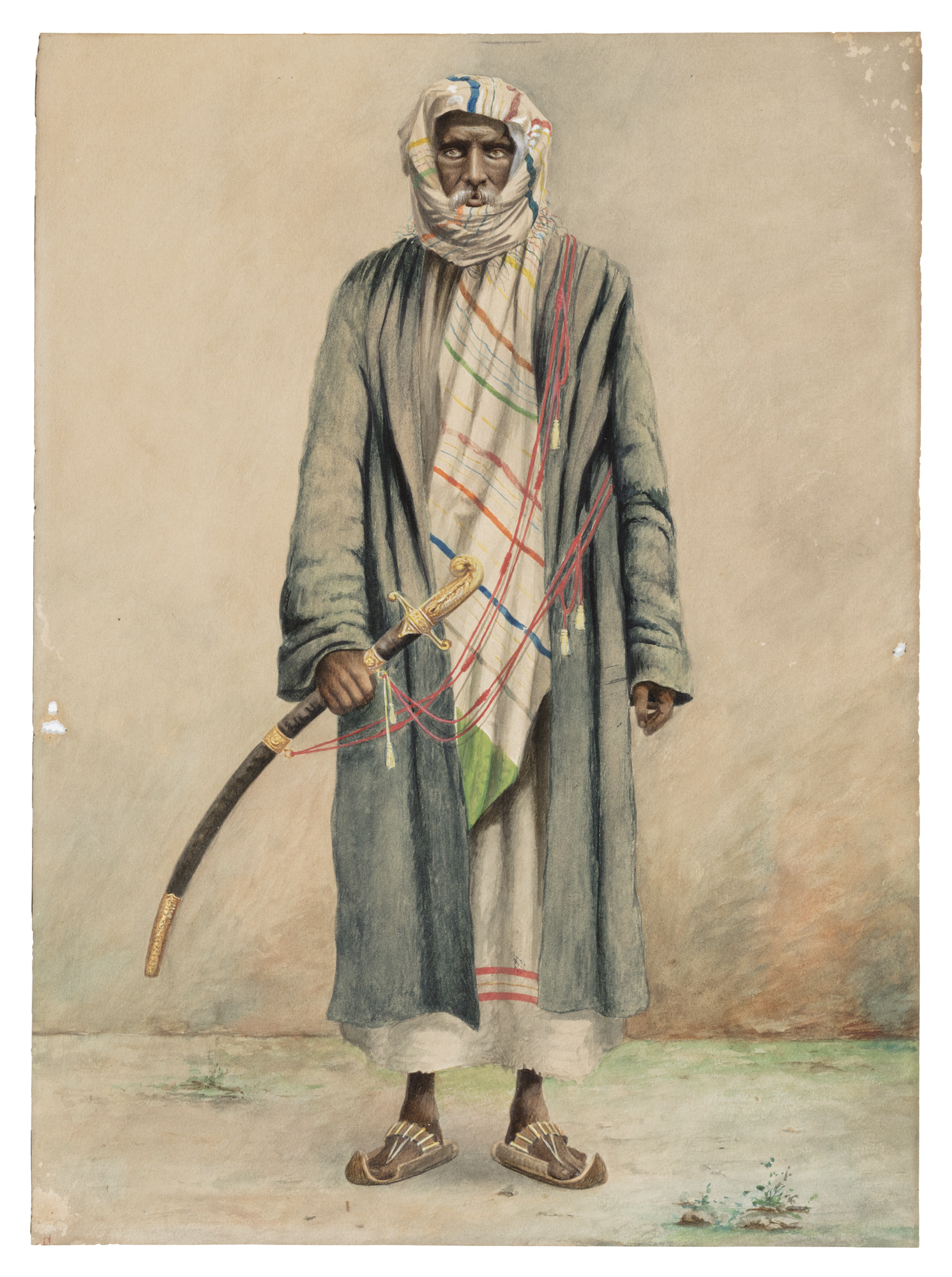
Portrait of Sultan Yusuf Ali Kenadid, the founder and first Sultan of the Hobyo sultanate

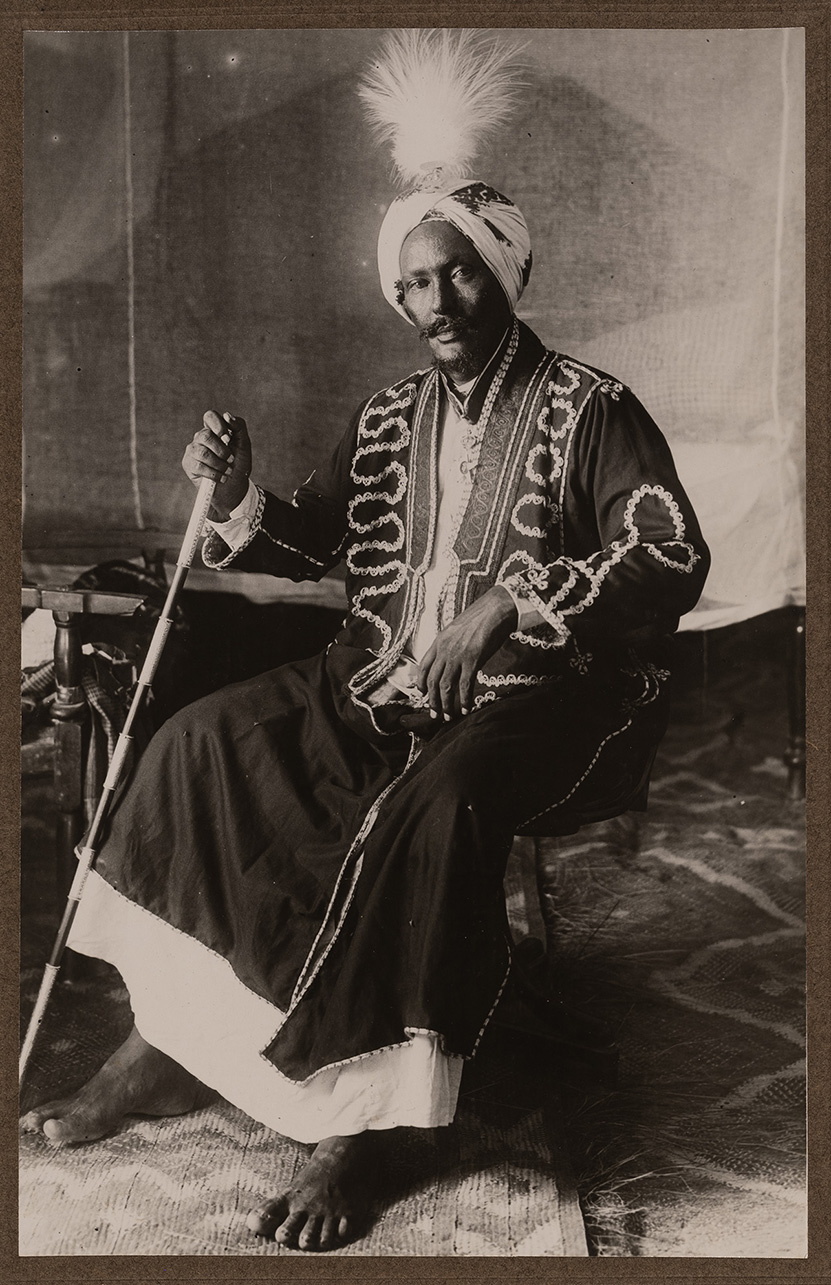
Portrait of Sultan Ali Yusuf Kenadid

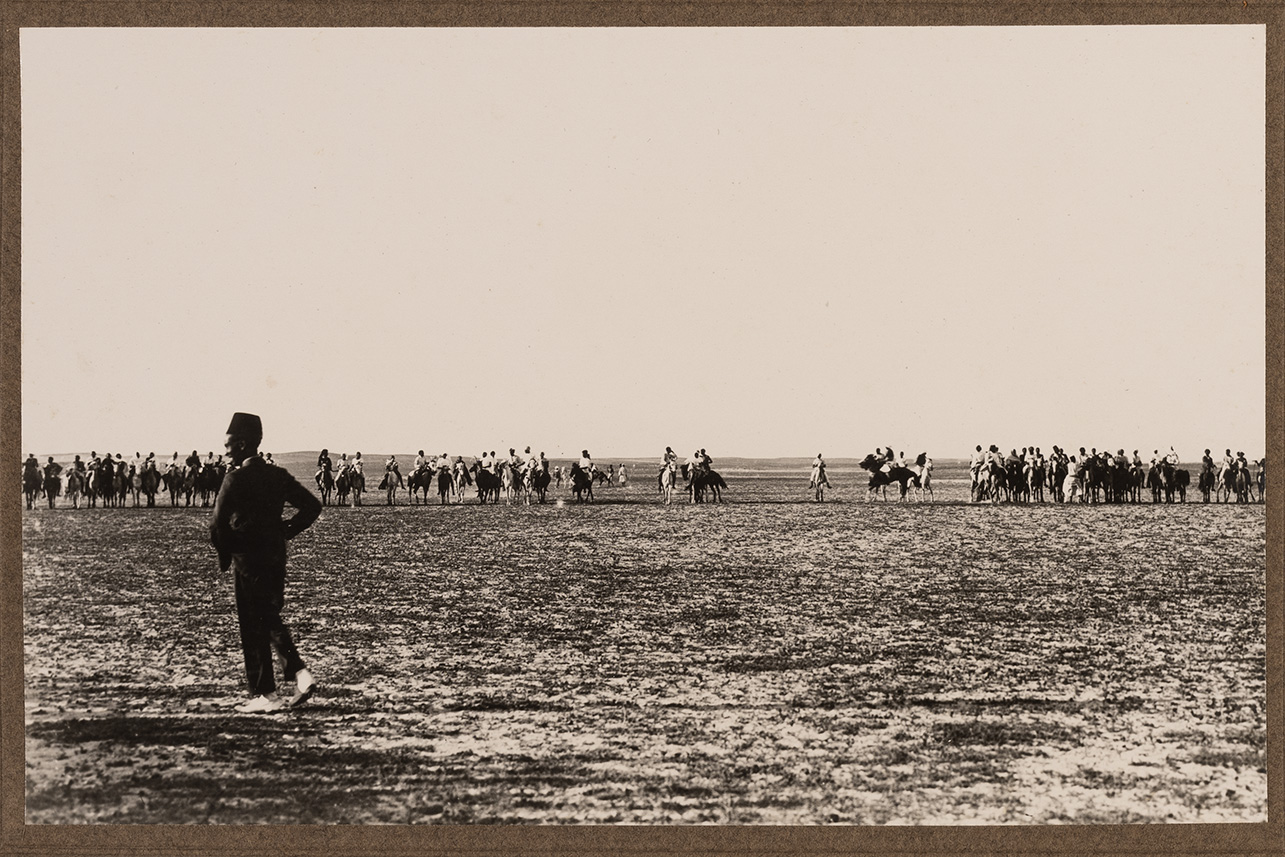
Yassin Ali, heir and son of Sultan Ali Yusuf Kenadid

As with the Majeerteen Sultanate, the Sultanate of Hobyo exerted a strong centralised authority during its existence and possessed all of the organs and trappings of an integrated modern state: a functioning bureaucracy, a hereditary nobility, titled aristocrats, a state flag, and a professional army. Like the Majeerteen Sultanate, it was another example of the determination of the independent Somali states to maintain a state free from European colonialism. Both sultanates also maintained written records of their activities, which still exist.

== History ==
=== Rise of the Sultanate ===
The sultanate of Hobyo originated from a rift within the Majeerteen. The election of Yusuf Ali as Sultan by Bah Lelkase and Bah Yaqub in Alula (which from the time of Boqor Xawaadane had been designated as the residence of the Bah Yaqubs) was the origin of a dynastic conflict.

Initially, Yusuf Ali Kenadid's goal was to seize control of the neighbouring Majeerteen Sultanate, which was then ruled by his cousin Boqor Osman Mahamud. However, he was unsuccessful in this endeavour, and was eventually forced into exile in Yemen. A decade later, in the 1870s, Kenadid returned from the Arabian Peninsula with a band of Hadhrami. With their assistance, he managed to overpower the local Habar Gidir clans and establish the Sultanate of Hobyo.

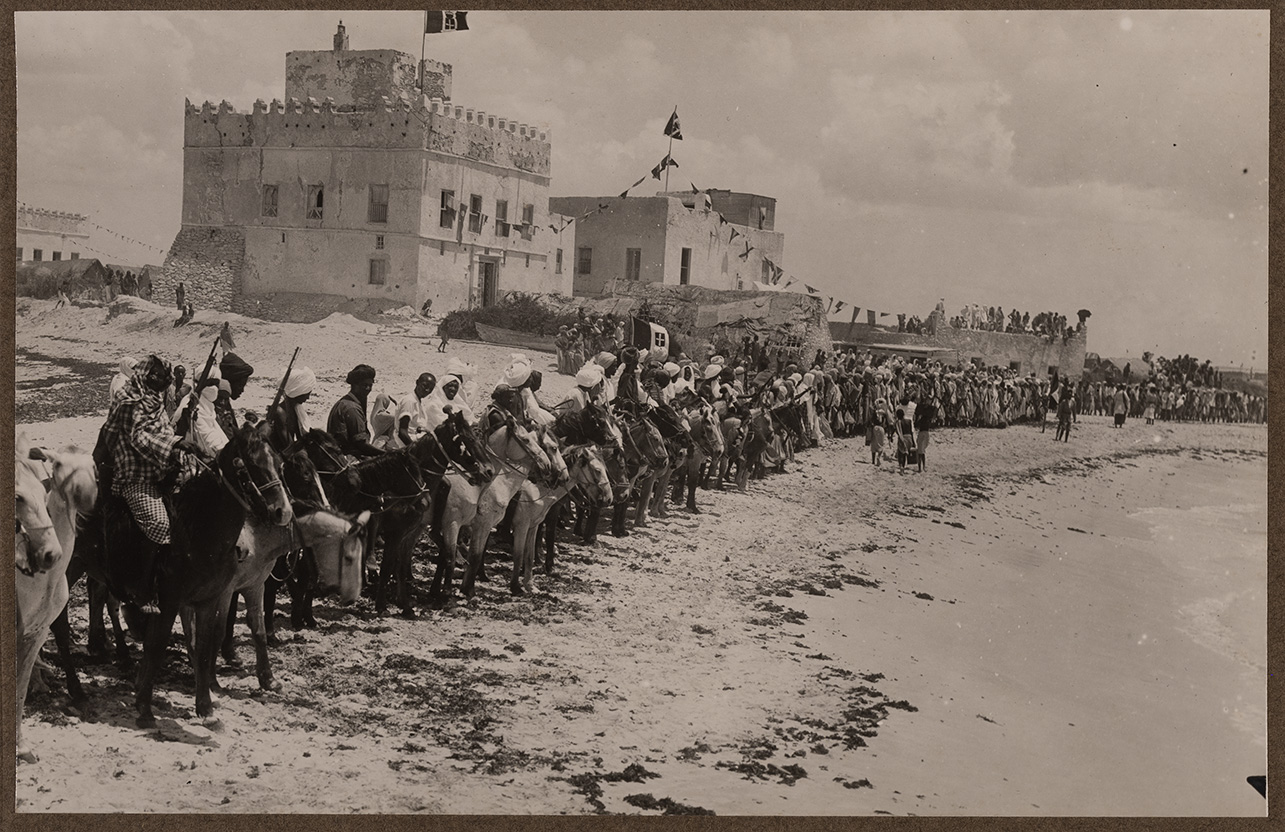
Cavalry of the Hobyo Sultanate

=== Early contact with Europeans ===
In the late 19th century, many Somali monarchs entered into treaties with one of the colonial powers, France, Britain, or Italy, Sultan Kenadiid entered into a treaty with the Kingdom of Italy, making his realm an Italian protectorate. His rival and cousin, Boqor Osman would sign a similar agreement in regard making his own realm an Italian protectorate the following year. Both rulers had signed the agreements with their own expansionist objectives, alongside effectively insuring the continued independence of their territories. With Kenadid looking to use Italy's support in his dispute with the Omani Sultan of Zanzibar over an area bordering Warsheikh, and in addition to his territorial disputes particularly over the Nugaal region, with the Majeerteen Sultanate under Boqor Osman.

The terms of each treaty specified that Italy was to steer clear of any interference in the sultanates' respective administrations. In return for Italian arms and an annual subsidy, the Sultans conceded to a minimum of oversight and economic concessions. The Italians also agreed to dispatch a few ambassadors to promote both the sultanates' and their own interests.

However, the relationship between Hobyo and Italy soured when Sultan Kenadid refused the Italians' proposal to allow a British contingent of troops to disembark in his Sultanate so that they might then pursue their battle against the emir of Diiriye Guure, Mohammed Abdullah Hassan and their Dervish forces. Viewed as too much of a threat by the Italians, Sultan Kenadiid was eventually exiled to Aden in Yemen and then to Eritrea, as was his son Ali Yusuf, the heir apparent to his throne. However, unlike the southern territories, the northern sultanates were not subject to direct rule due to the earlier treaties they had signed with the Italians.

=== Italian invasion and Omar Samatars Rebellion ===
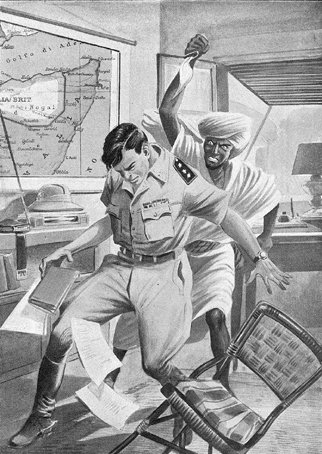
Omar Samatar, a Somali rebel leader attacking & killing Captain Franco Carolei in Ceelbuur, Somalia.

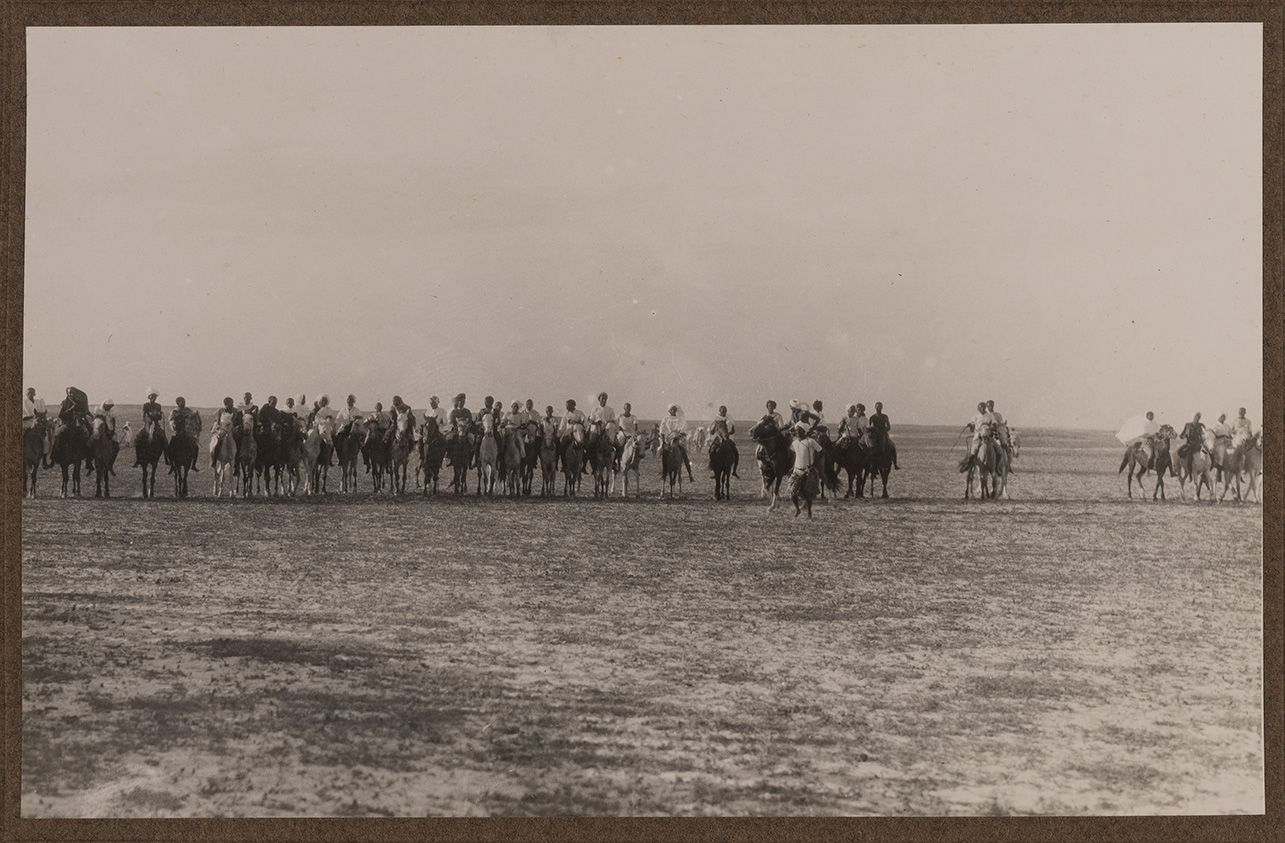
Horsemen of the Hobyo Sultanate

Though victorious against the sultan's forces, the populace had yet to accept Italian rule without a fight. Commissioner Trivulzio, assigned with administering Hobyo, reported the movement of armed men towards the borders of the sultanate before and after the annexation. As preparations were underway to continue the Corpo Zaptié's advance into Majeerteen Sultanate, a new threat emerged. One of Sultan Ali Yusuf Kenadiid’s commanders and former Naib (Governor), Omar Samatar, attacked and captured El Buur on the 9th of November 1925. The local populace sided with Omar, and soon enough the Italians had a full-scale revolution on their hands after Omar followed up his previous success with the capture of El-Dhere. The Corpo Zaptié tried and failed to recapture El-Bur from Omar. By 15 November the Italians had fled to Bud Bud, ambushed by partisans the whole way and rather diminished in forces and resolve.

A third attempt was planned, but before it could be executed the commander of the operation, Lieutenant-Colonel Splendorelli, was ambushed and killed between Bud Bud and Bula Barde by Somali rebels. Italian morale hit rock bottom, and Hobyo seemed a lost cause as Omar Samatar stood poised to reconquer Hobyo itself. In an attempt to salvage the situation, governor De Vecchi requested two battalions from Eritrea and assumed personal command. The rebellion soon spilled over the borders into the Benadir and Western Somaliland, and Omar grew increasingly powerful. The disaster in Hobyo shocked Italian policymakers in Rome. Blame soon fell on Governor De Vecchi, whose perceived incompetence was blamed for Omar's rise. Rome instructed De Vecchi that he was to receive the reinforcement from Eritrea, but that the commander of the Eritrean battalions was to assume the military command and De Vecchi was confined to Mogadishu and limited to an administrative role. The commander was to report directly to Rome, bypassing De Vecchi entirely.

As the situation was extremely confused, De Vecchi took former Sultan Ali Yusuf Kenadiid with him to Mogadishu. Mussolini vowed to reconquer all of Hobyo and move on to Majeerteenia by any means necessary. Even reinstating Ali Yusuf was considered. However, the clans had already sided with Omar Samatar, so this was not as viable an option as it would appear. Before the reinforcements arrived, De Vecchi chose the age old tactic of divide and rule, and offered great rewards, money and prestige to any clans who chose to support the Italians, notably the Habar Gidir, who were long enemies of the Hobyo Sultanate. Although many members of the Habar Gidir sided with Omar Samatars popular resistance originally.

Considering the eons-old clan rivalries which have been the bane of Somali states from time immemorial, it turned out to be far more successful than the Eritrean regiments in reversing the rebellion, and allying the local clans. The Habar Gidir were led by commander Hersi Gurey.

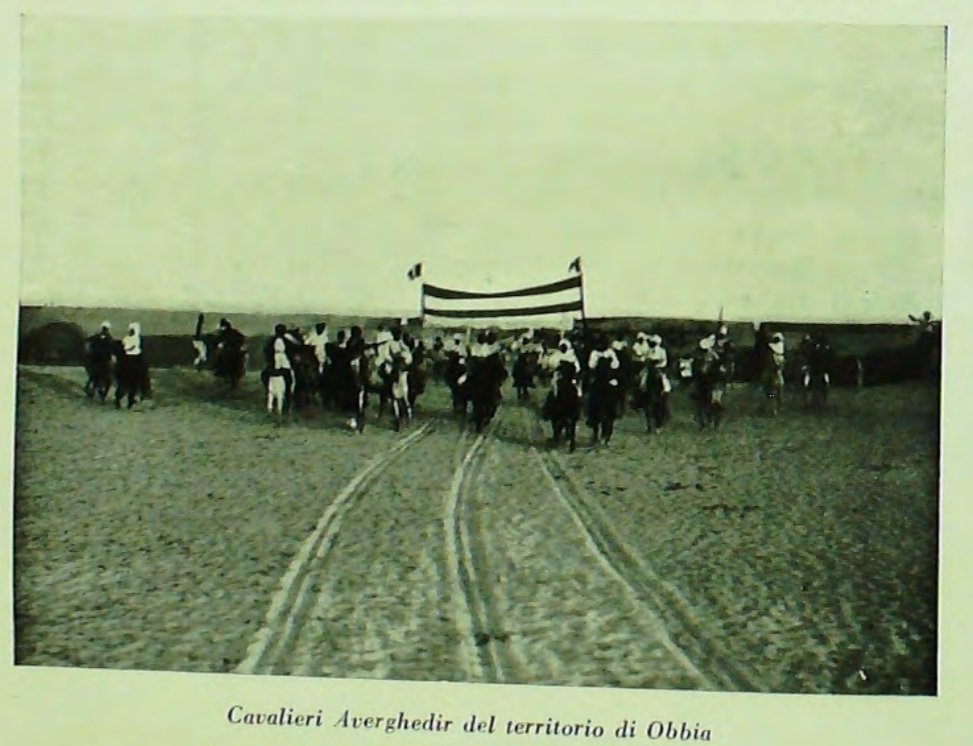
Habar Gidir cavalry in Hobyo

With the steam taken out of the rebellion, and the military forces heavily reinforced with the battalions from Eritrea, the Italians retook El-Buur on 26 December 1925, and eventually compelled Omar Samatar to retreat into Western Somaliland, although these fumbles against Hobyo, had been disastrous for the Italians, and Mussolini’s pride.

Nonetheless, a problem remained Ogaden where many rebels, alongside former leaders; Hersi Boqor, and Omar Samatar, retreated to after the war. Particularly the region of Gorrahei. Omar Samatar and Hersi Boqor for years these were a major concern for Italian authorities and caused frictions with Fascist Italy, as they were successfully in skirmishes and raids able to penetrate Italian territory on occasion.

== Legacy ==
The Cumar-Samatar Secondary School in central Galkacyo is named after Omar Samatar in remembrance of his struggles and sacrifices against the Italians.

What was left by the Sultanate of Hobyo, in terms of culture and political vision, continued Mogadishu. After the Second World War, former members of the Sultanate, under new conditions helped in creating Somali nationalism. The Osmanya script and foundation of the Somali Youth League (SYL) owes much regards to the former Hobyo Sultanate.

== See also ==
- Yasin Osman Kenadid
- Yusuf Ali Kenadid
- Boqor Osman Mahmud
- Osmanya script
- List of Sunni Muslim dynasties
- Ali Yusuf Kenadiid
- Italian Somali Wars
- Campaign of the Sultanates
