= Majeerteen Sultanate =

Northeastern Somali sultanate

Majeerteen Sultanate Suldanadda Majeerteen 𐒈𐒚𐒐𐒆𐒖𐒒𐒖𐒆𐒆𐒖 𐒑𐒖𐒃𐒜𐒇𐒂𐒜𐒒 سلطنة مجرتين Migiurtinia
- 15th-16th century–1927
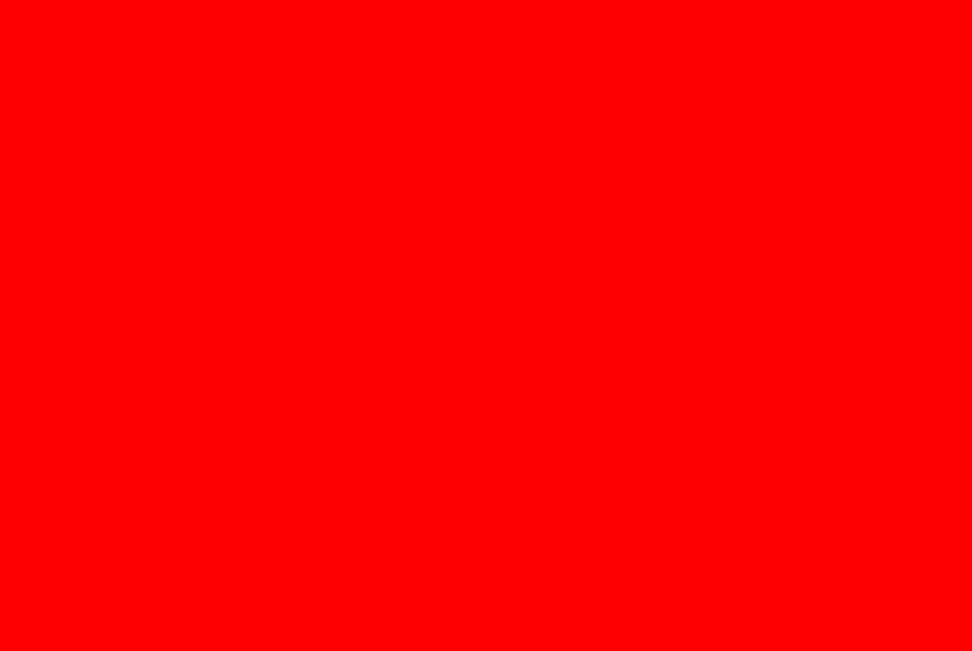
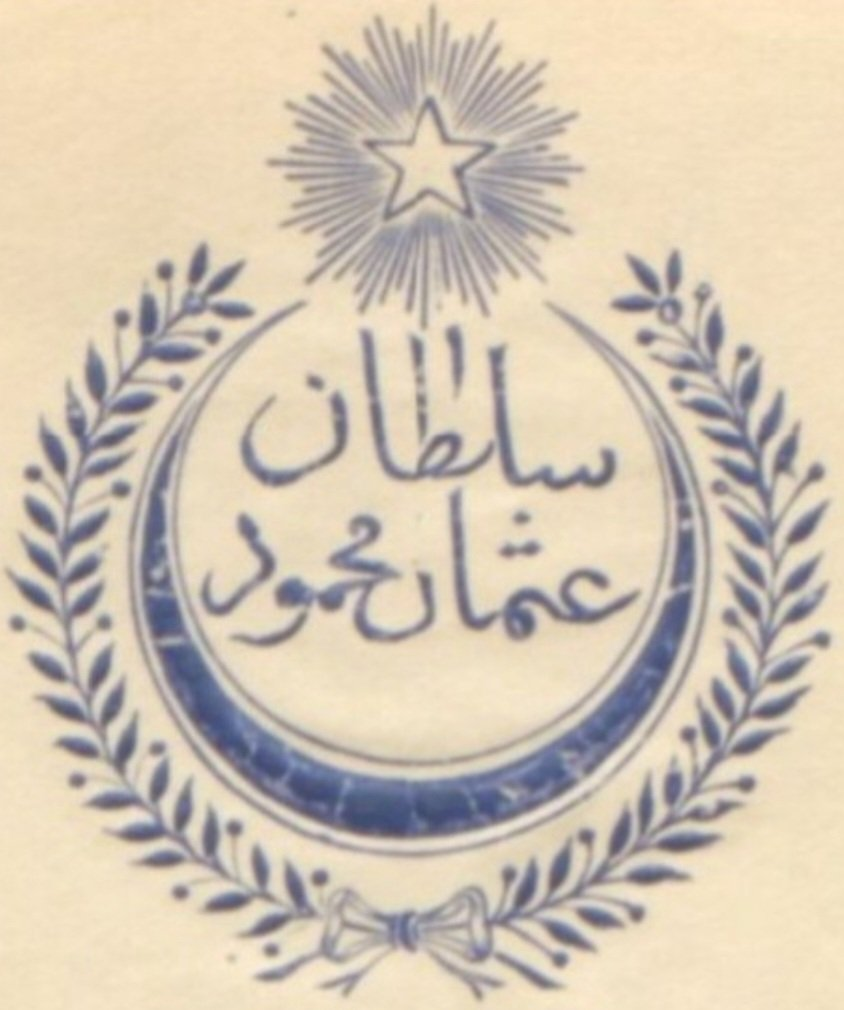
- Flag Coat of arms

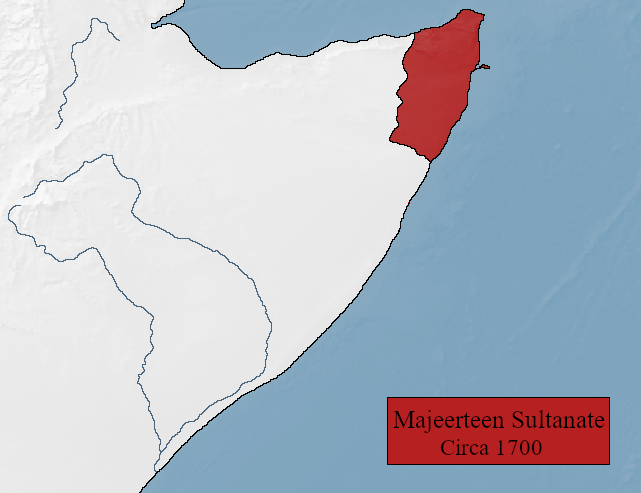
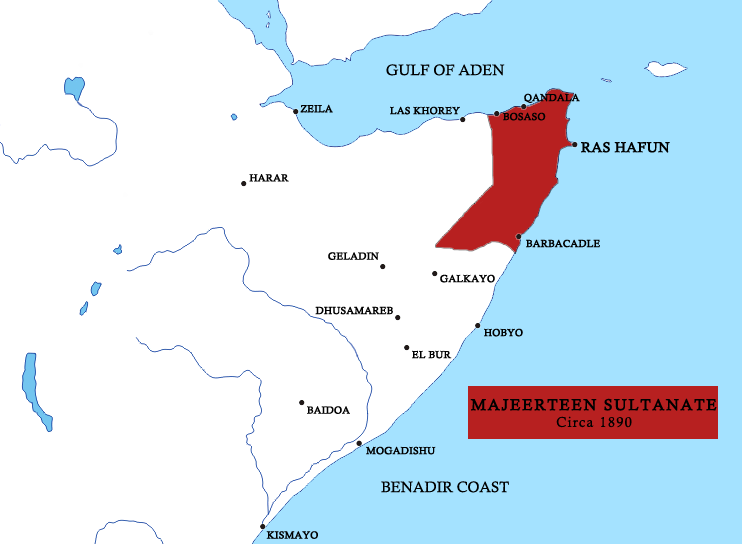
- Status: Somali Sultanate Sovereign until 7 April 1889; Protectorate of Italy (7 April 1889–26 October 1926)
- Capital: Alula
- Common languages: Somali
- Religion: Islam
- Demonym: Majeerteen
- Government: Monarchy
- Sultan
  - 1809-1818: Boqor Yusuf Ali
  - 1818–1835: Boqor Mahmud Yusuf
  - 1835–1837: Boqor Osman Mohamoud
  - 1837–1866: Boqor Mahmud Osman
  - 1866–1927: Boqor Osman Mohamoud
- History
  - Established: 15th-16th century
  - Haji Ali Majeerteens invasion of the Geledi Sultanate: 1844-1847
  - War with Yusuf Ali Kenadid and the Sultanate of Hobyos independence: 1878
  - Campaign of the Sultanates, disestablishment: 1927

Area
  - Total: 124,320 km^{2} (48,000 sq mi)
Preceded by	Succeeded by
Adal Sultanate	Sultanate of Hobyo; Italian Somaliland
- Today part of: Somalia

The Majeerteen Sultanate (Somali: Suldanadda Majeerteen, lit. 'Boqortooyada Majerteen', Arabic: سلطنة مجرتين), or Majerteen Kingdom also known as Majeerteenia and/or Migiurtinia, was a Somali kingdom centered in the Horn of Africa. Ruled by Osman Mohamoud during its golden age, the sultanate controlled the areas corresponding to modern-day Puntland. The earliest mention of the kingdom is the late 15th or 16th century. The polity had all of the organs of an integrated modern state and maintained a robust trading network. It also entered into treaties with foreign powers and exerted strong centralized authority on domestic affairs. On April 7, 1889, it became a protectorate of Italy after a treaty. After the Campaign of the Sultanates, a nearly year war, it was eventually integrated into the colony of Italian Somaliland.

Established in 1998, the autonomous Puntland state within northeastern Somalia now administers much of the former territories of the Majeerteen Sultanate (Majeerteenia).

== History ==
=== Establishment ===
The Majeerteen Sultanate was established by Somalis from the Majeerteen sub-clan of the Darod clan. Charles Guillain places the origins of the state in 1420. Oral traditions describe its formation at the late 15th or early 16th century. Although the area handbook series puts its emergence at the mid-18th century. Francisco Álvares, a Portuguese missionary and explorer who spent six years at the Portuguese embassy in Abyssinia, wrote about a ruler in the Guardafui region subject to Adal.

The Kingdom of Adel (as they say) is a large kingdom, and it extends over the Cape of Guardafui, and there in that part another rules subject to Adel.

He also describes a visit to the land between Cape Guardafui and the mountain of Felis for the purchasing of wethers and goats.

This land where they were bought is between Cape Guardafui and the mountain of Felis,' and the distance between them is thirty-six miles. And it is a very sterile land, with very bad people; money is not used there, only cloths, and the thicker they are the higher they are valued. And much white salt and much white gum are found in this land; and the Captain Major gave orders for a large quantity to be taken on to be sent to Portugal, as they said it was good for caulking ships.

It was a semi-nomadic Sultanate, which appeared to have a strong seafaring tradition along the coastal settlements. The Sultanate rose to prominence during the 19th century, under the reign of the shrewd and resourceful Boqor (King) Osman Mahamuud.

=== Haji Ali Majeerteens invasion of the Geledi ===
Haji Ali Majeerteen arrived in Merca and formed an alliance with the Bimaal clan. He settled in the area near Merca with the consent of the Bimaal clan and began his Dawah activities and education programs. It is established that Ali had secret plans for himself to form a colony at the port of Mungiya, the point where Shabelle River was closest to the Indian Ocean and had obtained permission from Sultan Yusuf Mahamud Ibrahim of the Geledi Sultanate to do so. However, initially, he attempted to play the role of a peacemaker between Sultan Yusuf and the Bimaal clan in their conflict, sending a letter to Sultan Yusuf requesting him that he accepts his reconciliation proposal. The Sultan, upon hearing of the proposal refused the offer, feeling disrespected that a newcomer would interfere with his internal affairs.

Haji Ali was furious and in response declared war against the Geledi and his men raided a string villages near the capital of the Geledi, Afgooye. This included the coastal city of Barawa. Yusuf and the Geledi army confronted Haji Ali's well armed followers which mainly hailed from the Majeerteen tribe, and annihilated them in battle. Munginya was burnt to the ground and Haji Ali's ambitious dreams ended.

==== Haji Ali’s response ====
Haji Ali penned a letter he sent to the people of Barawa on the Banaadir coast, in that he considered the Geledi Sultanate a polity adhering to a deviated sect, (Firqa Al-Dalah). According to him, this deviation had to be stamped out through either Dawah or ultimate Jihad.

Following his defeat against the Sultans of the Geledi, Sheikh Ali stated that

"In reality, our [death], if you are among the deviated sect which Sultan Yusuf leads, there is no relation between us, and your blood will not be saved from us."

— Haji Ali Majeerteen

The hardline stance of Haji Ali, to the propagation of Islam among his people, his mobilization of armed followers, and his siding with the Bimaal clan against Geledi Sultanate displays the militant ideology akin to the Bardera Jama, and the new Wahhabi tendency that was emerging across the Muslim world at the time.

=== Majeerteen-British agreement ===
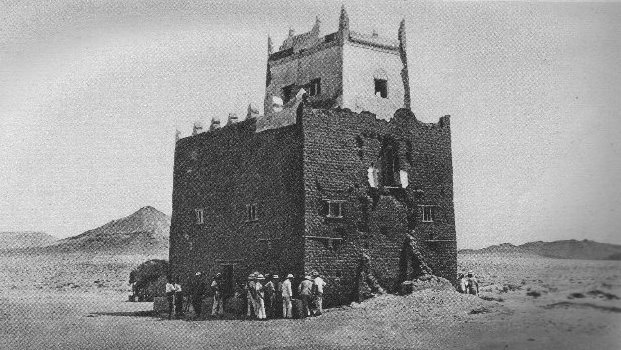
One of the forts of the Majeerteen Sultanate (Migiurtinia) in Hafun.

Due to consistent ship crashes along the northeastern Cape Guardafui headland, Boqor Osman's kingdom entered into an informal agreement with Britain, wherein the British agreed to pay the King annual subsidies to protect shipwrecked British crews and guard wrecks against plunder. The agreement, however, remained unratified, as the British feared that doing so would "give other powers a precedent for making agreements with the Somalis, who seemed ready to enter into relations with all comers."

=== War with Yusuf Ali Kenadid and the Sultanate of Hobyo ===
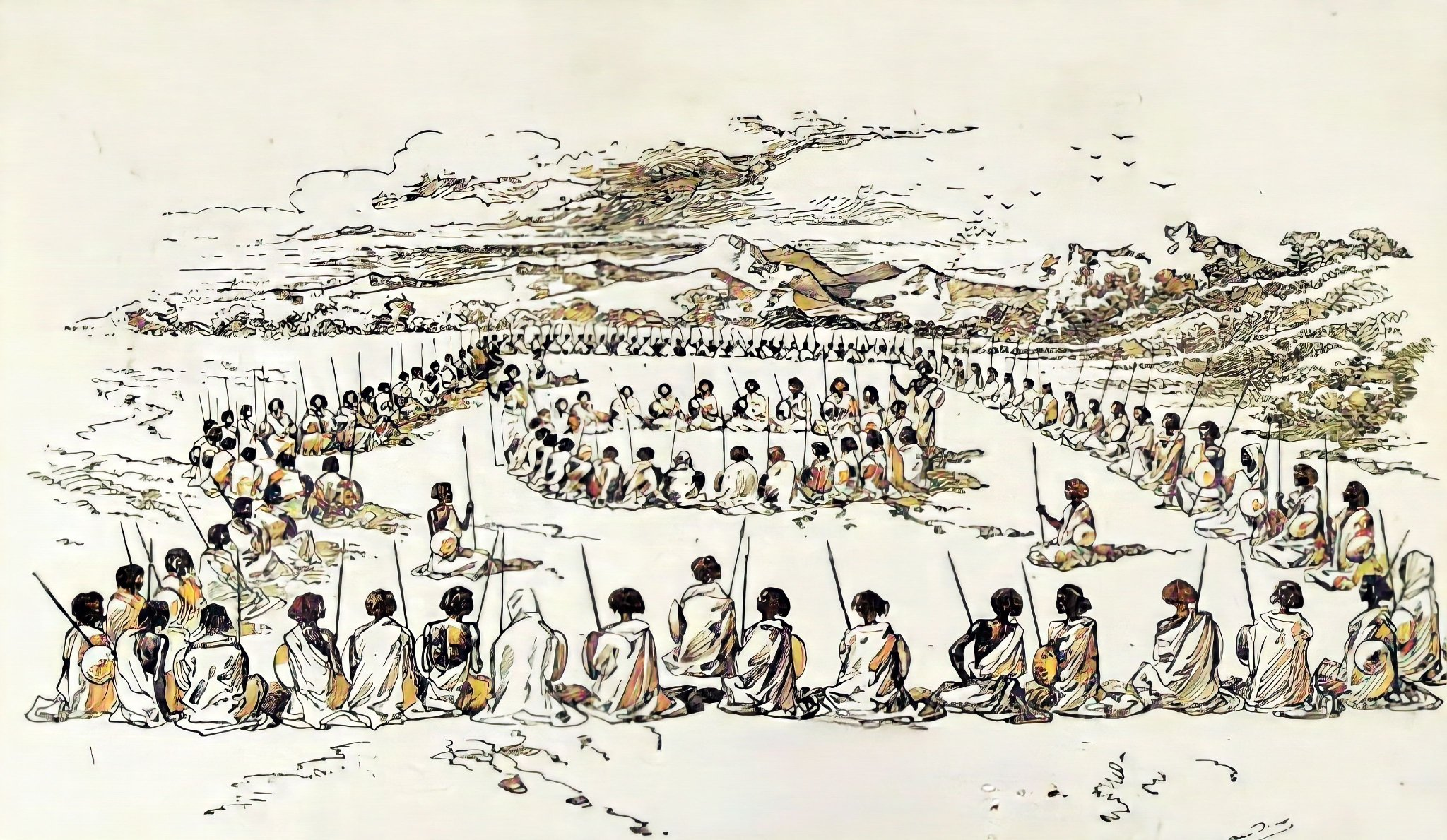
Majeerteen soldiers loyal to Boqor Osman have a meeting, in preparation of war

Boqor Osman Mahamuud's Kingdom was under attack in the mid-19th century due to a power struggle between himself and his ambitious cousin, Yusuf Ali Kenadiid. After almost five years of battle, the young upstart was terribly defeated and the Sultan Kenadiid was finally forced into exile in Yemen. A decade later, in the 1870s, Kenadiid returned from the Arabian Peninsula with a band of Hadhrami musketeers and a group of devoted lieutenants. With their assistance he managed to break away from Majeerteenia, then overpower the local Habar Gidir in Mudug, and establish the separate Sultanate of Hobyo in 1878.

=== Majeerteen-Italian treaties ===
In the late 19th century, all extant Somali monarchs entered into treaties with one of the colonial powers, Abyssinia, Britain or Italy, except for the Dhulbahante clan, since the Italians considered part of the Dhulbahante subject of the Italian-protected Sultan of Majeerteen. With the intermediation of Sultan Yusuf Ali Kenadid and after a conference of all notables of the sultanate in Bargal, in 7 April 1889 in Alula, Boqor Osman entered into a treaty with Italy, making his kingdom a protectorate known as Italian Somaliland.

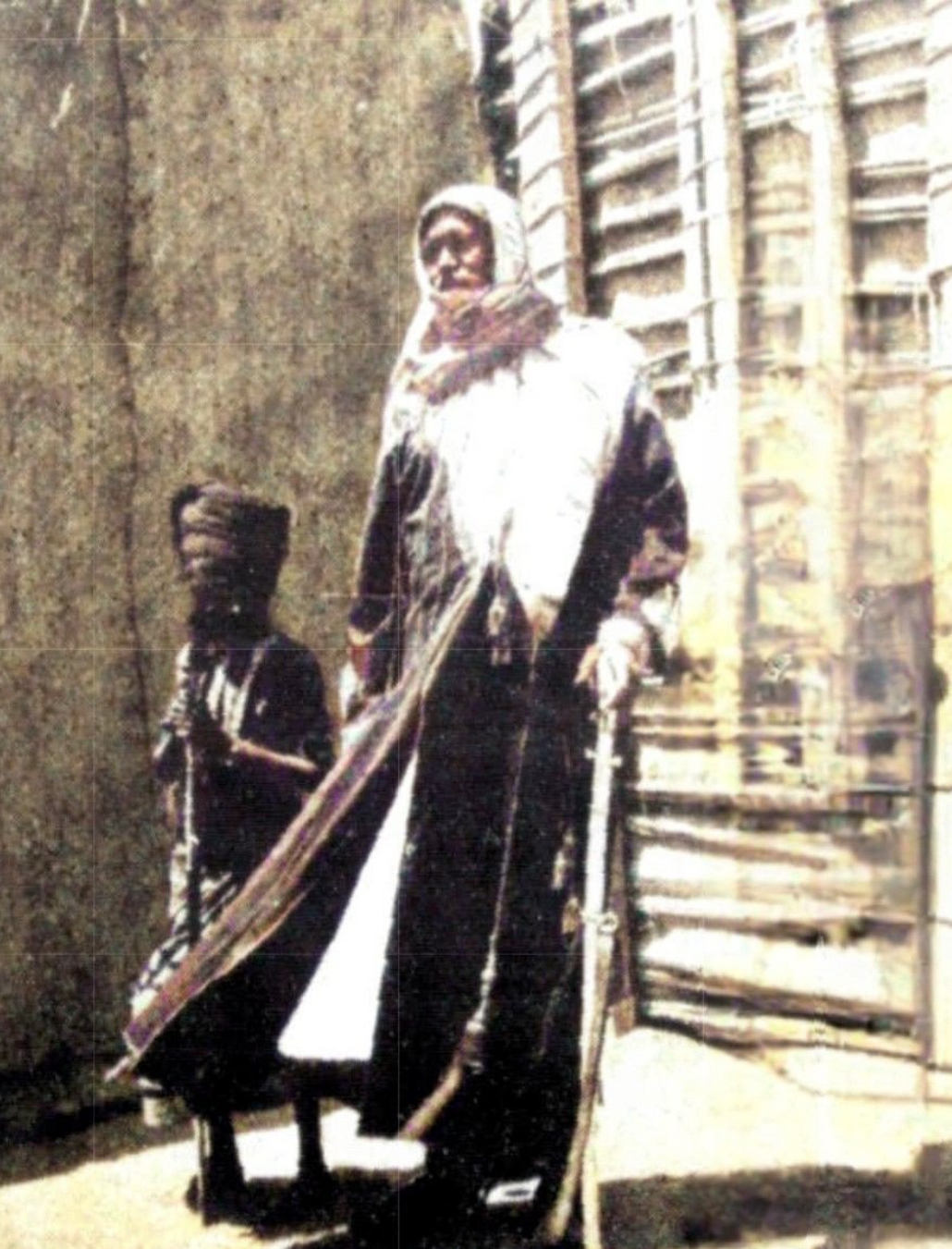
Boqor Osman and his young son in 1911

In the years following the treaty the protectorate was however rather nominal due to Italian warships tasked with maintaining contact with the sultan and visiting so rarely and irregularly. Piracy, looting of crashed steamships, weapons trade and slave trade could be carried out with almost no consequences.

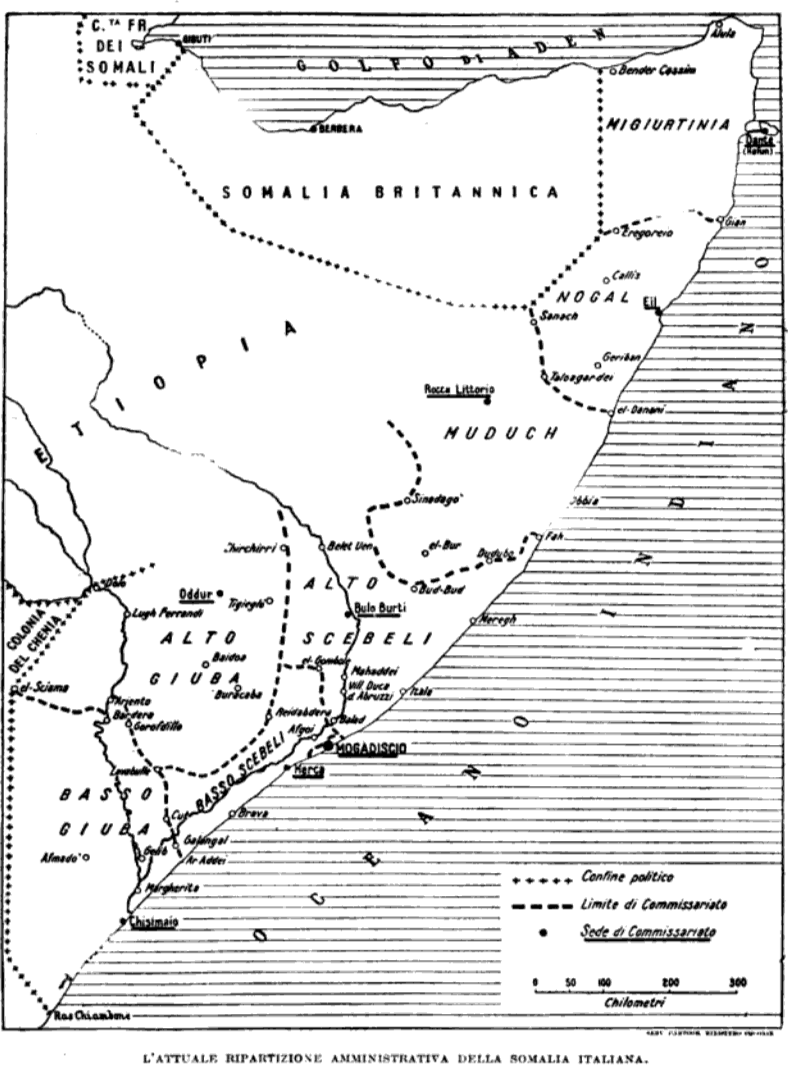
Italian Somaliland including the Majeerteen Sultanate.

His second cousin and rival Sultan Yusuf Ali Kenadid had signed a similar agreement vis-a-vis his own Sultanate of Hobyo the year before. Both Boqor Osman and Sultan Kenadid had entered into the protectorate treaties to advance their own expansionist goals, with Sultan Kenadid looking to use Italy's support in his ongoing power struggle with Boqor Osman over the Majeerteen Sultanate, as well as in a separate conflict with the Omani Sultan of Zanzibar over an area to the north of Warsheikh. In signing the agreements, the rulers also hoped to exploit the rival objectives of the European imperial powers so as to more effectively assure the continued independence of their territories.

The terms of each treaty specified that Italy was to steer clear of any interference in the sultanates' respective administrations. In return for Italian arms and an annual subsidy, the sultans conceded to a minimum of oversight and economic concessions. The Italians also agreed to dispatch a few ambassadors to promote both the sultanates' and their own interests. The new protectorates were thereafter managed by Vincenzo Filonardi through a chartered company. An Anglo-Italian border protocol was later signed on 5 May 1894, followed by an agreement in 1906 between Cavalier Pestalozza and General Swaine acknowledging that Baran fell under the Majeerteen Sultanate's administration. With the gradual extension into northern Somalia of Italian colonial rule, both kingdoms were eventually annexed in the early 20th century. However, unlike the southern territories, the northern sultanates were not subject to direct rule due to the earlier treaties they had signed with the Italians.

=== Lead up to the Campaign of the Sultanates ===
With the arrival of Governor Cesare Maria De Vecchi on 15 December 1923, things began to change in Somalia, Italy had access to these areas under the successive protection treaties, but not direct rule. The Fascist government had direct rule only over the majority of Benadir territory. Given the defeat of the Dervish movement in the early 1920s, and the rise of fascism in Europe, on 1925, Mussolini gave the green light to De Vecchi to start the takeover of the northern sultanates. Everything was to be changed and the treaties abrogated.

To make the enforcement of his plan more viable, he began to reconstitute the old Somali police corps, the Corpo Zaptié, and the new Dubats as a colonial force. Who were mostly led by Capo Hersi Gurey, a major ally of Italy in this conflict.

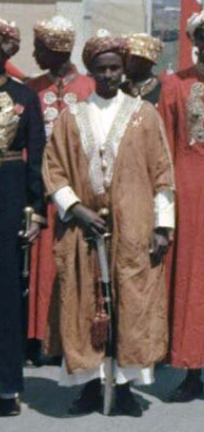
Capo Hersi Gurey in Rome, 1938

In preparation for the plan of invasion of the sultanates, the Alula Commissioner, E. Coronaro received orders in April 1924 to carry out a reconnaissance on the territories targeted for invasion. In spite of the forty year Italian relationship with the sultanates, Italy did not have adequate knowledge of the geography. During this time, the Stefanini-Puccioni geological survey was scheduled to take place. Such, concluded that the Majeerteen Sultanate depended on sea traffic, therefore, if this were blocked any resistance could be “mounted” as the first stage of the invasion plan, Governor De Vecchi ordered the two Sultanates to disarm. The reaction of both sultanates was to object, as they felt the policy was against the protectorate agreements. The pressure engendered by the new development forced the two northern sultanates, Hobyo and Majeerteenia, to settle their differences, and form a united front against their common enemy.

=== Conflict ===
The new Alula commissioner, presented Boqor Osman with an ultimatum to disarm and surrender. Meanwhile, Italian troops began to pour into the sultanate in anticipation of this operation. While landing at Haafuun and Alula, the sultanate's troops opened fire on them. Fierce fighting ensued and to avoid escalating the conflict and to press the fascist government to revoke their policy, Boqor Osman tried to open a dialogue. However, he failed, and again fighting broke out between the two parties. Following this disturbance, on 7 October the Governor instructed Coronaro to order the Sultan to surrender; to intimidate the people he ordered the seizure of all merchant boats in the Alula area. At Hafun, Arimondi bombarded and destroyed all the boats in the area.

On 13 October Coronaro was to meet Boqor Osman at Baargaal to press for his surrender. Under siege already, Boqor Osman was playing for time. However, on 23 October, Boqor Osman sent an angry response to the Governor defying his order. Following this a full-scale naval attack was ordered in November. Baargaal is bombed by the Italian cruiser 'Campania' for 22 hours after initial Italian efforts to take the town are pushed back and several Italian officers are killed.

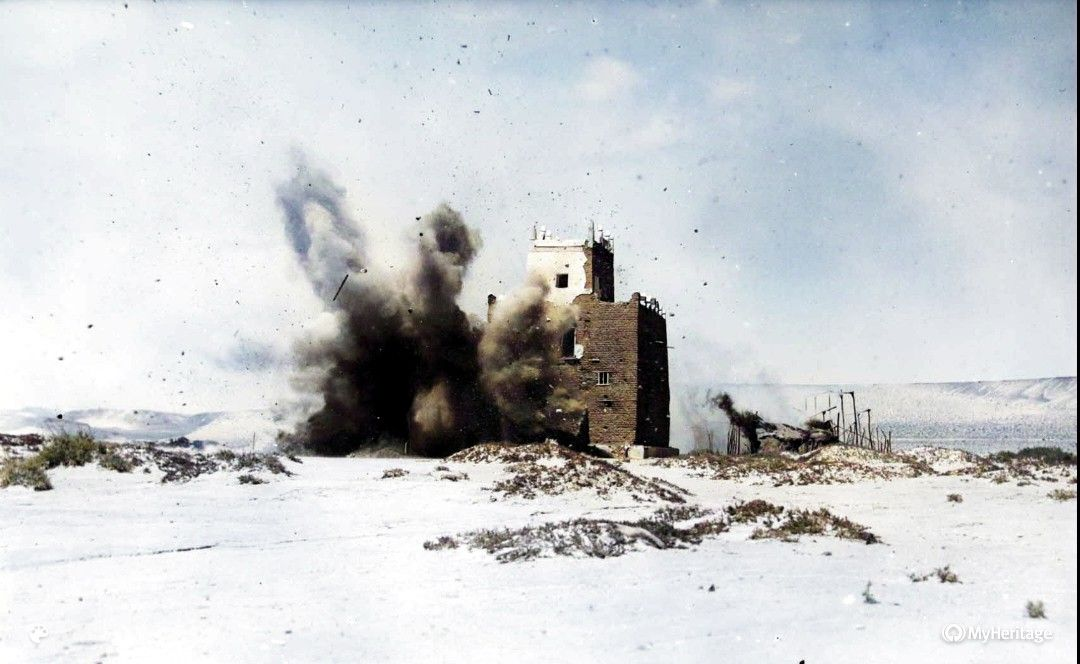
Bombardment of Bargaal

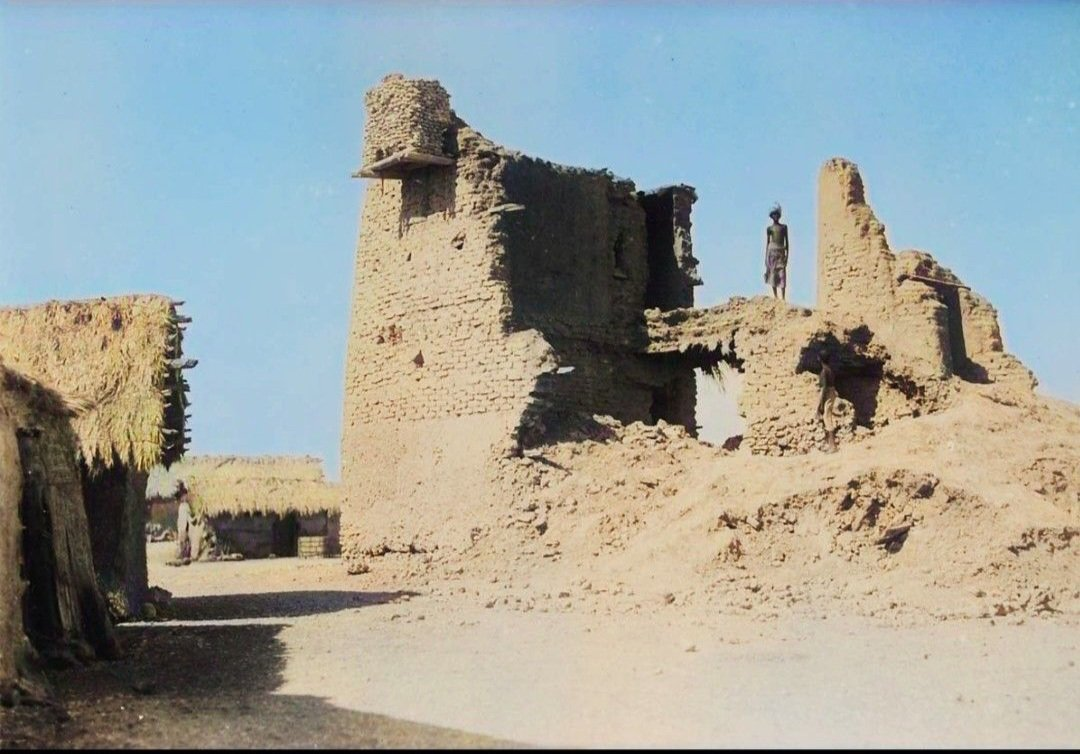
Aftermath of the bombings

The attempt of the Italians to suppress the region erupted into an explosive confrontation. The Italians were meeting fierce resistance on many fronts. In December 1925, led by the charismatic leader Hersi Boqor, son of Boqor Osman, the sultanate forces drove the Italians out of Hurdia and Haafuun, two strategic coastal towns.

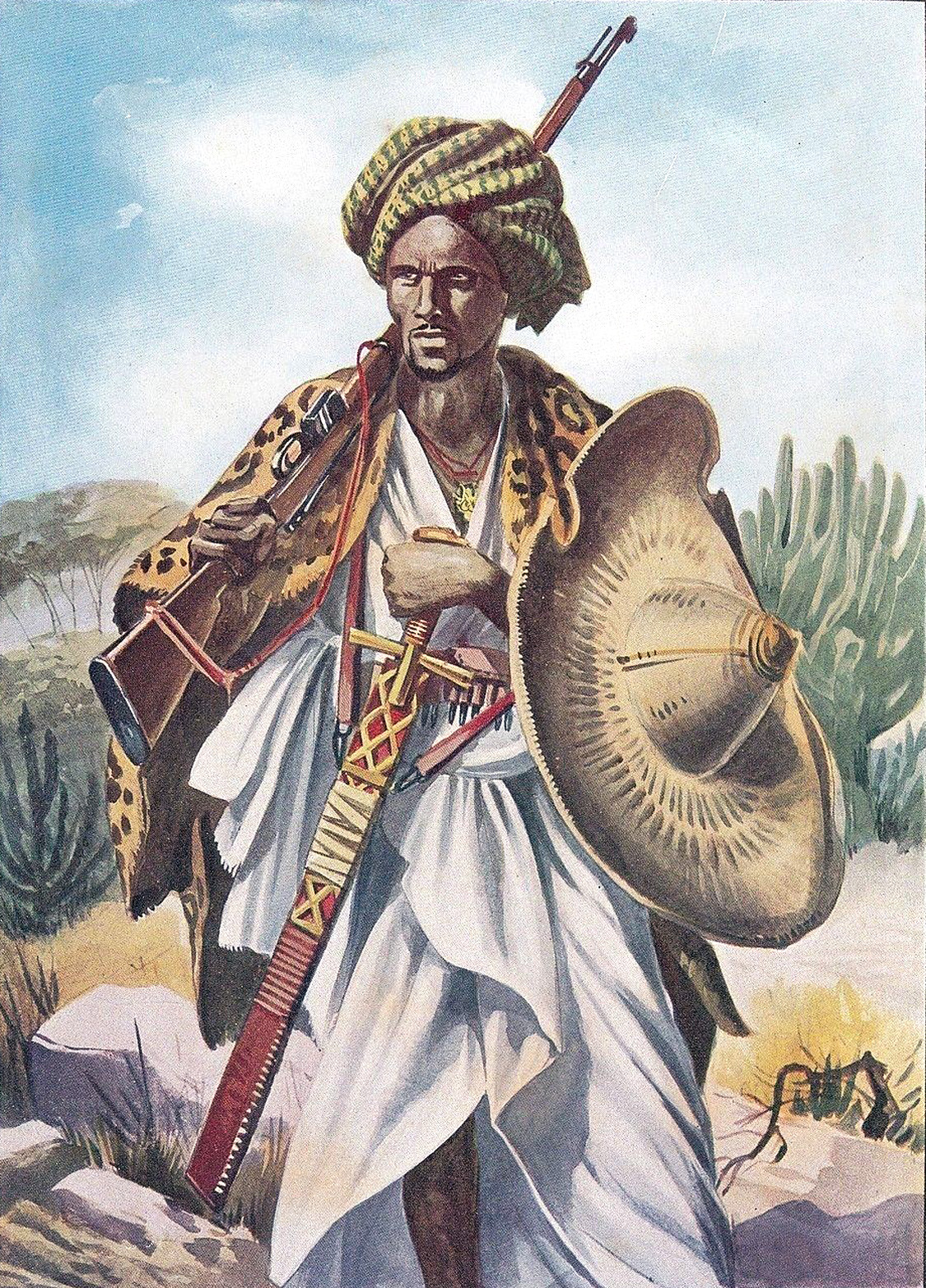
Hersi Boqor, son of Boqor Osman, who led the rebellion

Another contingent attacked and destroyed an Italian communications centre at Cape Guardafui, at the tip of the Horn. In retaliation, the Bernica and other warships were called on to bombard all main coastal towns of the Majeerteen. After a violent confrontation Italian forces inevitably captured Eyl, which until then had remained in the hands of Hersi Boqor. In response to the unyielding situation, Italy called for reinforcements from their other colonies, notably Eritrea. With their arrival at the closing of 1926, the Italians began to move into the interior where they had not been able to venture since their first seizure of the coastal towns. Their attempt to capture Dharoor Valley was resisted by Hersi Boqor, and ended in failure for the Italians.

Due to the immense retaliation of the Majeerteen, Italians were not able to entirely capture Majeerteenia until late 1927, when after the conflict at Iskushkuban Hersi Boqor and his top staff were forced to retreat to Somali Galbeed in order to rebuild the forces. However, they had an epidemic of cholera which frustrated all attempts to recover his force.

The nearly three year war ended with the complete bombardment of many coastal North Eastern towns in which is now a part of Puntland, and the deaths of around 550 Italians, and 456 Dubats/Eritrean Askaris.

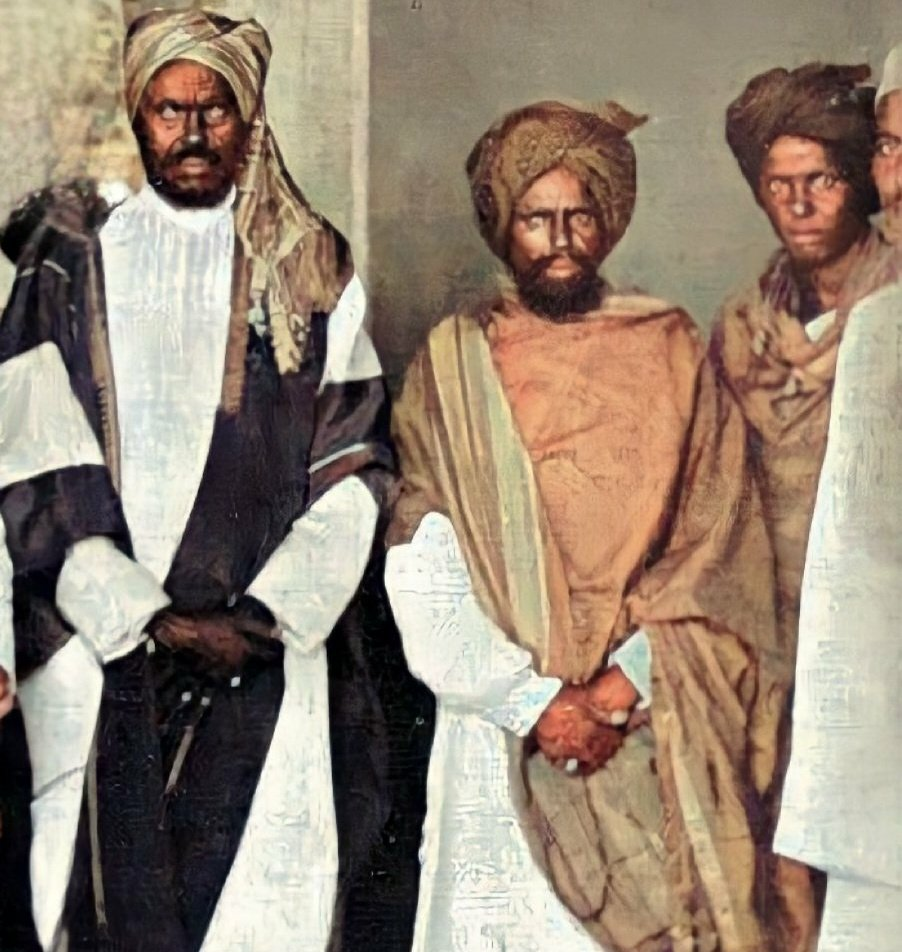
Boqor Osman Mahmud II to the far left, with his brother, Yusuf Mahmud and son, Musa Osman in exile, Mogadishu

== Administration ==
=== Bureaucracy ===
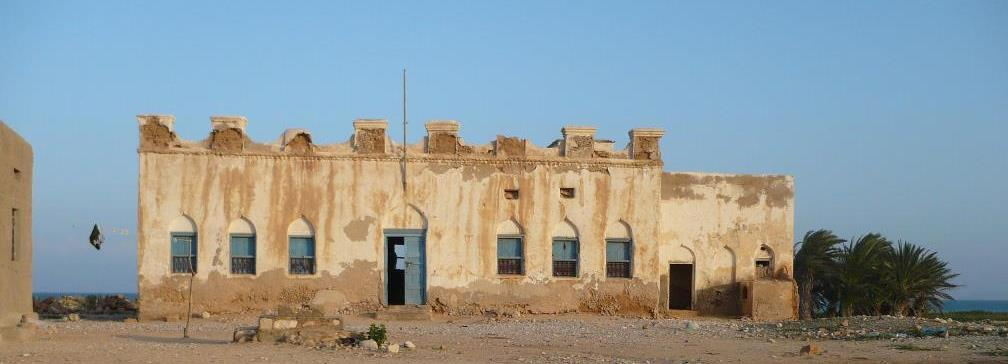
Ruins of King Osman's castle in Bargal (built in 1878), a seasonal capital of the Majeerteen Sultanate

The Sultanate of Hobyo and the Majeerteen Sultanate exerted a strong centralized authority during its existence, and possessed all of the organs and trappings of an integrated modern state: a functioning bureaucracy, a hereditary nobility, titled aristocrats, a state flag, and a professional army. Both sultanates also maintained written records of their activities, which still exist.

The Majeerteen Sultanate's main capital was at Alula, with its seasonal headquarters at Bargal. It likewise had a number of castles and forts in various areas within its realm, including a fortress at Murcanyo.

Boqor Osman had residences in numerous cities across Majeerteenia, notably in Bareeda, Bosasoo, and Bargaal. The Majeerteen Sultanate's ruler, however, commanded more power than was typical of other Somali leaders during the period. Especially in their high levels of centralization where each Majeerteen sub clan recognized the Boqor was supreme ruler. As the primus inter pares, Boqor Osman taxed the harvest of aromatic trees and pearl fishing along the seaboard. He retained prior rights on goods obtained from ship wrecks on the coast. The Sultanate also exerted authority over the control of woodland and pastureland, and imposed both land and stock taxes.

=== Commerce ===
According to official reports from 1924 commissioned by the Regio Governo della Somalia Italiana, the Majeerteen Sultanate maintained robust commercial activities before the Italian occupation of the following year. The Sultanate reportedly exported 1,056,400 Indian Rupees (IR) worth of commodities, 60% of which came from the sale of frankincense and other gums. Fish and other sea products sold for a total value of 250,000 IR, roughly equivalent to 20% of the Sultanate's aggregate exports. The remaining export proceeds came from livestock, with the export list of 1924 consisting of 16 items.

=== Military ===
In addition to a strong civil administration, the Majeerteen Sultanate maintained a regular army. Besides protecting the polity from both external and internal threats, military officials were tasked with carrying out the King's instructions. The latter included tax collection, which typically came in the form of the obligatory Muslim alms (seko or sako) ordinarily tithed by Somalis to the poor and religious clerics (wadaads).

== Major cities of the Majeerteen Sultanate ==
- Alula
- Hafun
- Bosaso
- Qardho
- Garowe
- Gaalkacyo
- Iskushuban
- Qandala
- Bayla
- Baargaal

== Sultans ==
Rulers of the Majeerteen Sultanate:

#	Sultan	Reign	Notes
1	Suldaan Cismaan "Bah-Dir"	1815–1842	Also known as Cismaan I
2	Suldaan Yuusuf "Bah-Yaaquub" of Bahdir-Rooble	1842–1844	Also known as Yuusuf I. Brief reign of only two years.
3	Suldaan Maxamuud Suldaan Cismaan Maxamuud	1844–1860	
4	Suldaan Cismaan Suldaan Maxamuud Suldaan Cismaan	1860–1927	Also known as Osman Mahamuud or Cismaan II Maxamuud. Long reign of almost 70 years. Last Sultan of the Majeerteen Sultanate Administration

== See also ==
- Majeerteen
- Puntland
- History of Somalia
- Osman Mohamoud
- Adal Sultanate
- Warsengali Sultanate
- Yusuf Ali Kenadiid
- Hobyo Sultanate
- List of Muslim empires and dynasties
- List of Sunni Muslim dynasties
