= Campaign of the Sultanates =

1925–1927 Italian military campaign in northeast Somalia

- Part of the Italian Somali Wars and the interwar period
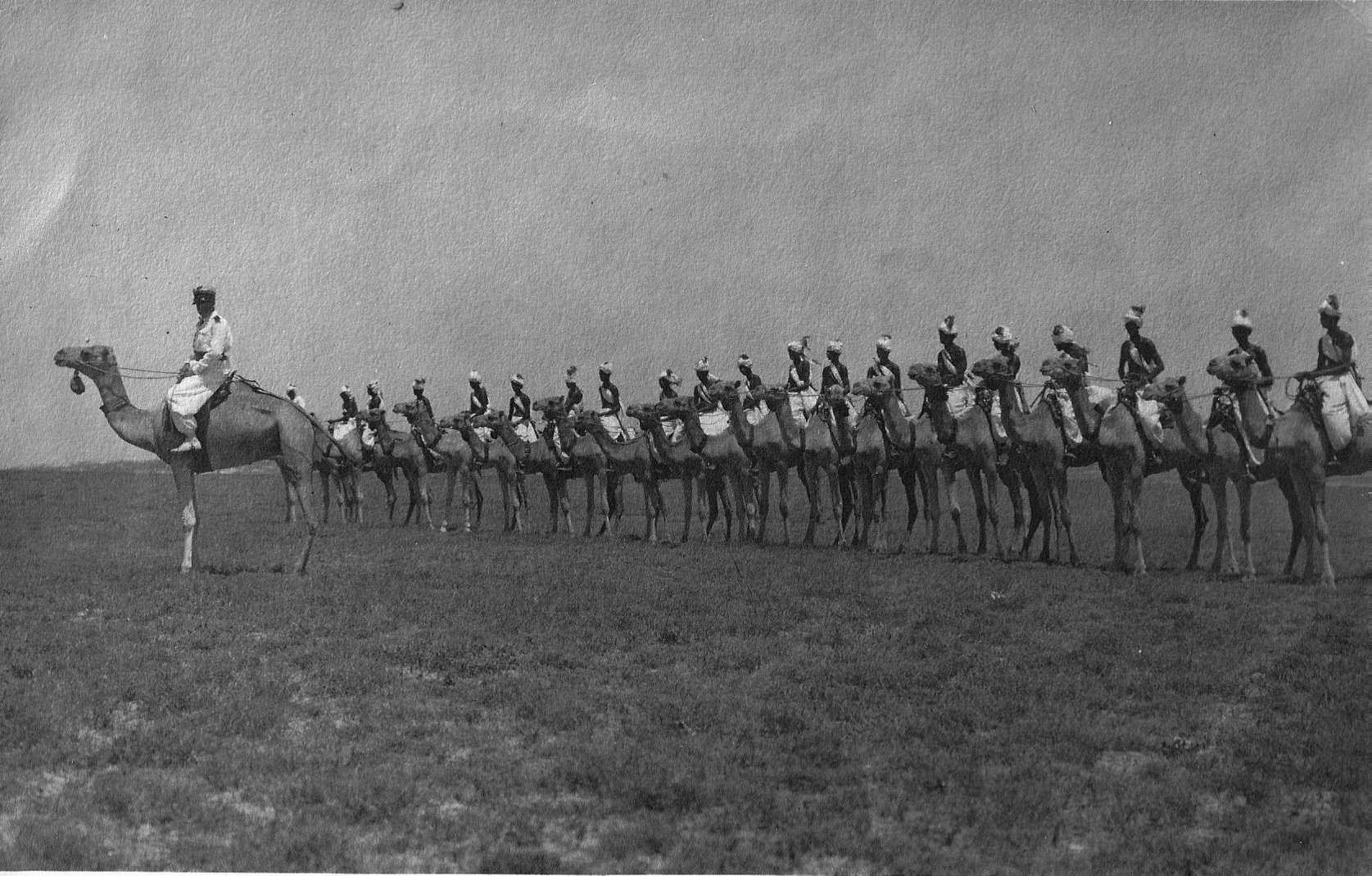
- Somali Dubat camel colonial troops under command of Italian Colonel Camillo Bechi
| Date | 1925–1927 |
| Location | Horn of Africa, Italian Somaliland |
| Result | Italian victory: Continued raids and incursions deep into Italian Somaliland by former rebel leaders Hersi Boqor and Omar Samatar in the Ogaden |
| Territorial changes | Italian occupation and disintegration of the Majeerteen Sultanate and Sultanate of Hobyo |

Belligerents
| Kingdom of Italy: Italian Somaliland; Italian Eritrea | Majeerteen Sultanate; Sultanate of Hobyo |

Commanders and leaders
| (Kingdom of Italy) Cesare De Vecchi (Italian Somaliland) Hersi Gurey (Kingdom of Italy) Guido Splendorelli † (Kingdom of Italy) Franco Carolei X | Osman Mohamoud (surrendered); Ali Yusuf Kenadid; Omar Samatar; Hersi Boqor; Abshir Dhoore (DOW) |

Strength
| 6 Banaadir battalions 3 Eritrean battalions (12,000 men) (Note: Including 3,000 dubats, 2,500 tribal irregulars and 500 Zaptié.); 135 artillery pieces 3 aircraft | Unknown |

Casualties and losses
| 896 killed and wounded | Unknown |

Stages of the Campaign

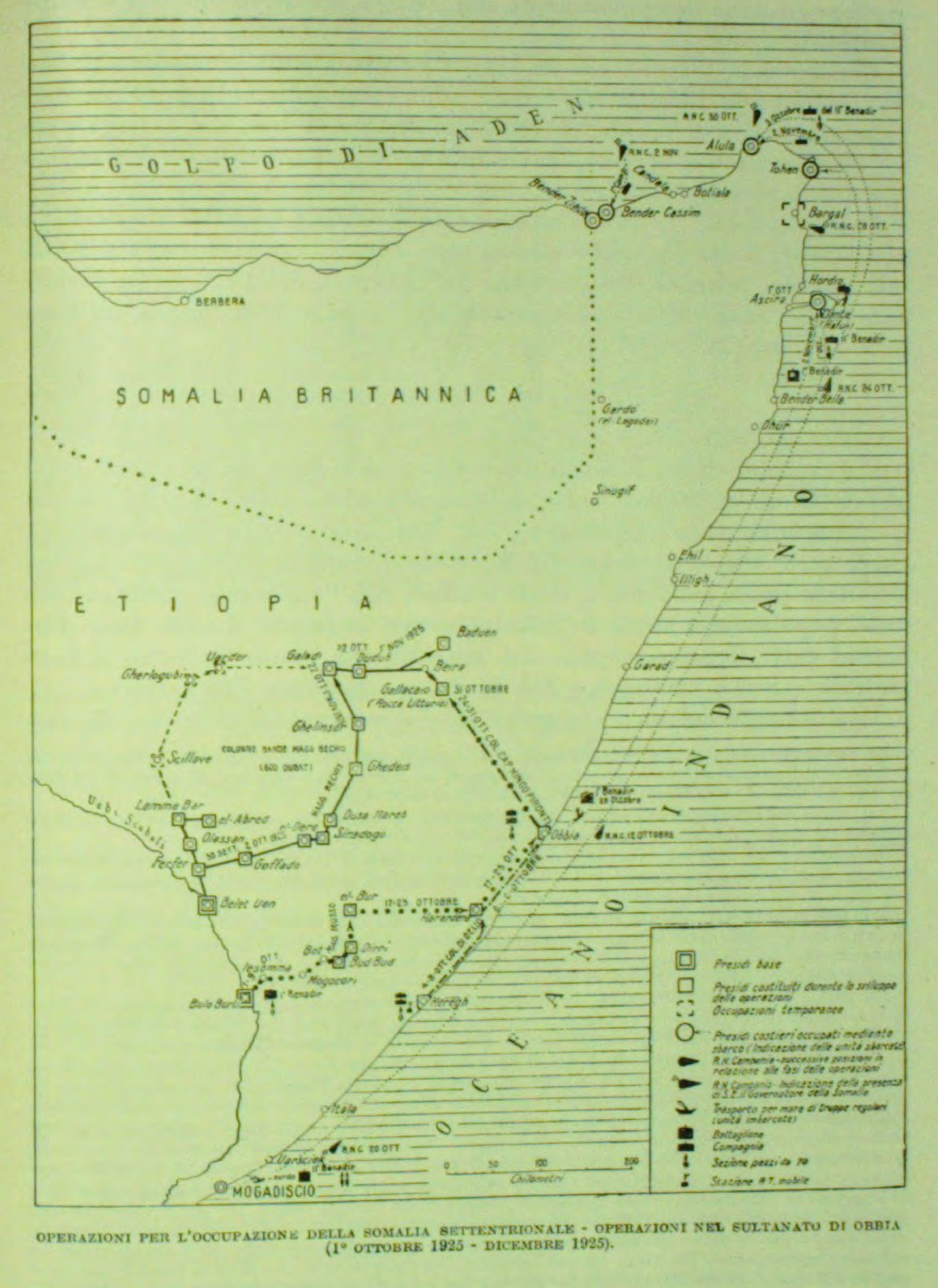
1 October–December 1925

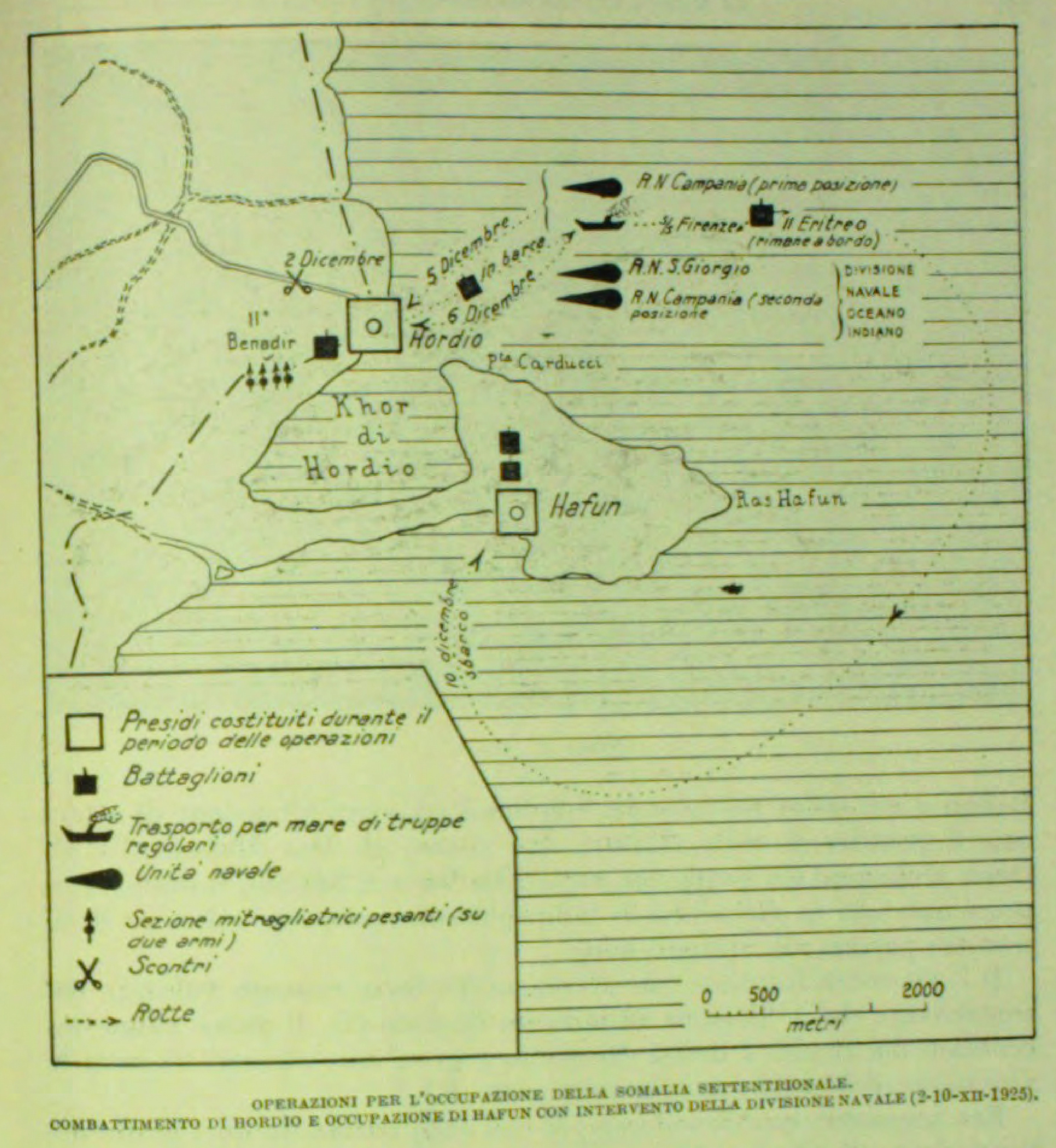
2–10 December 1925

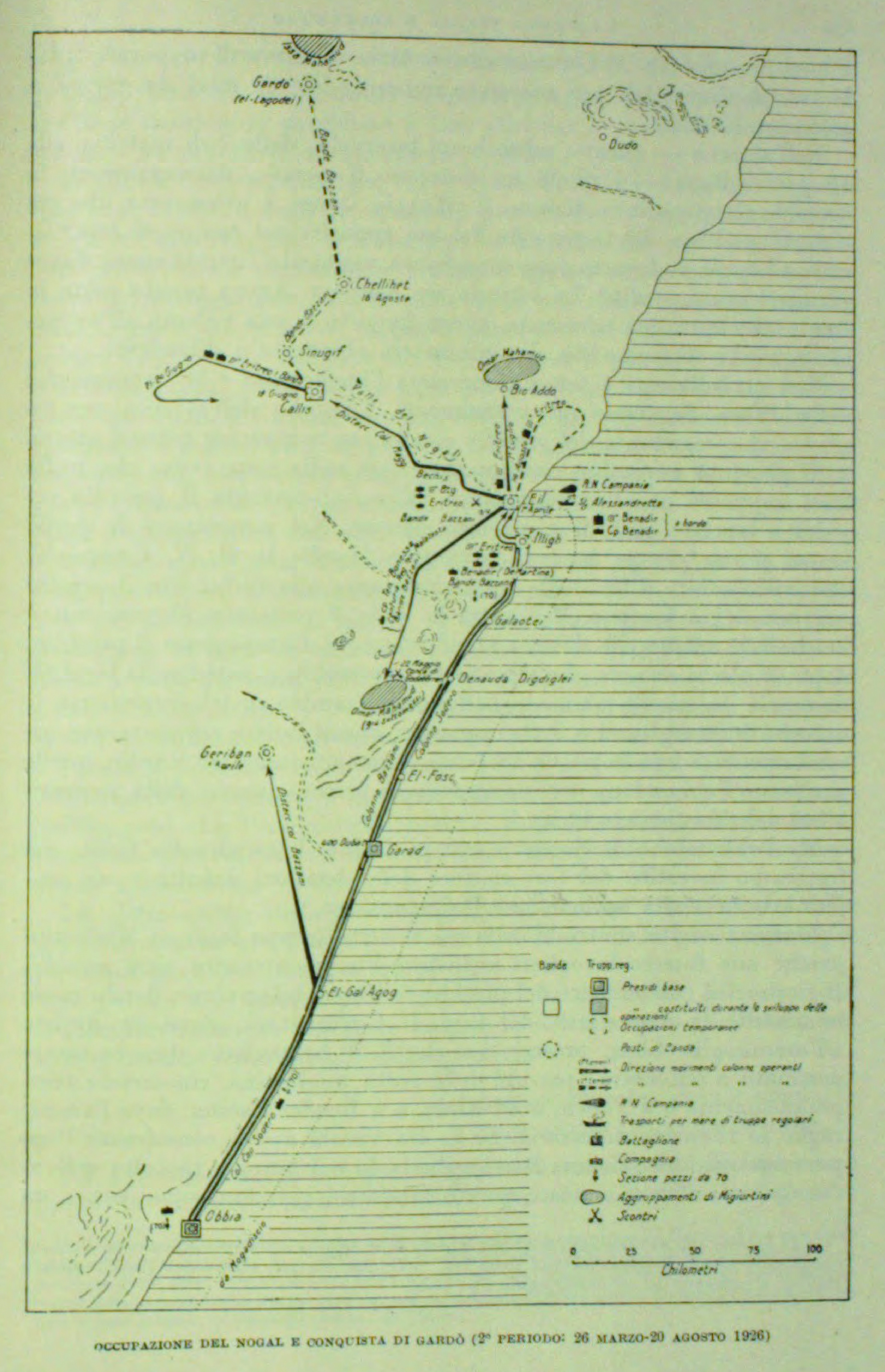
26 March-20 August 1926

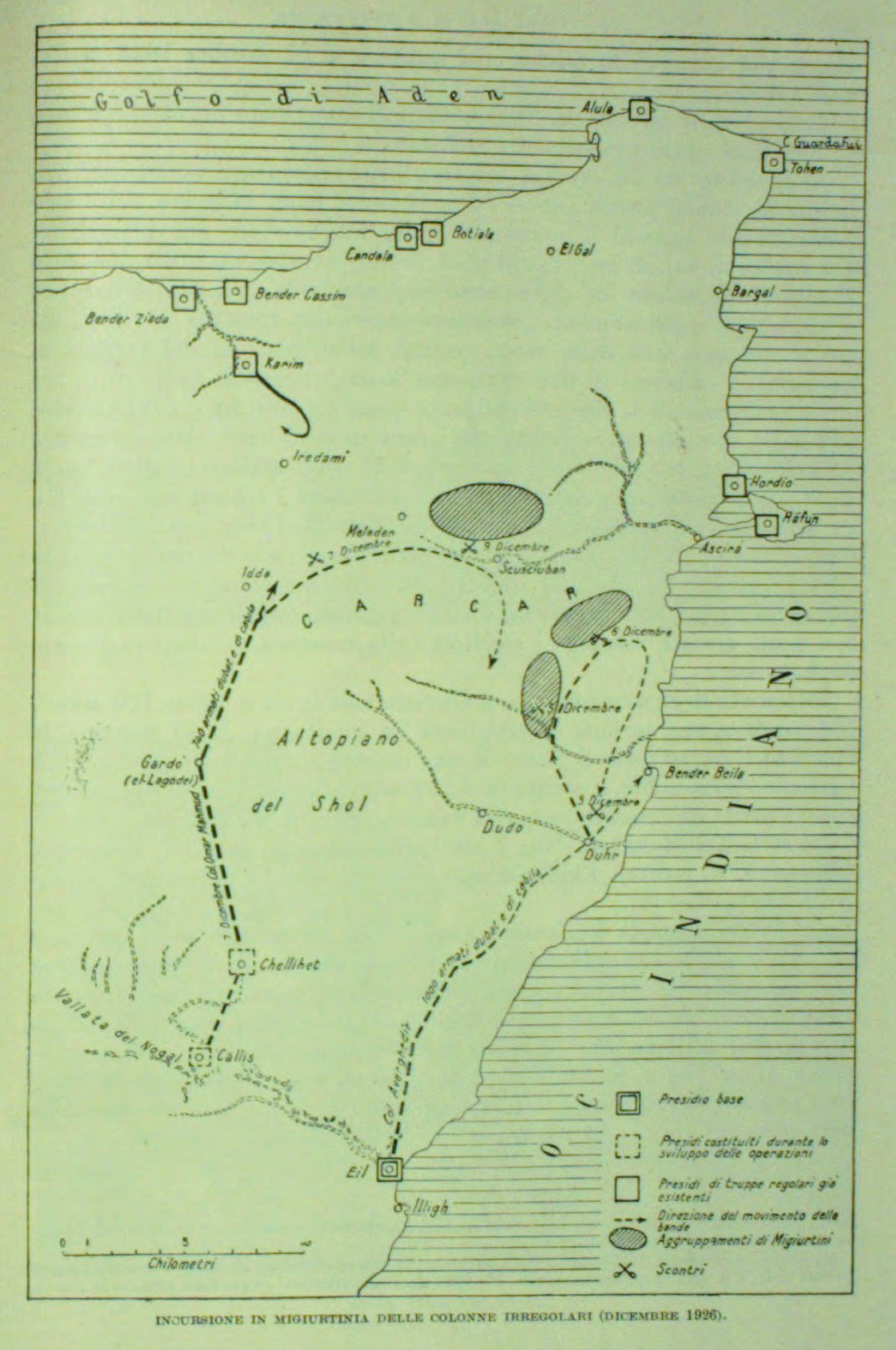
December 1926

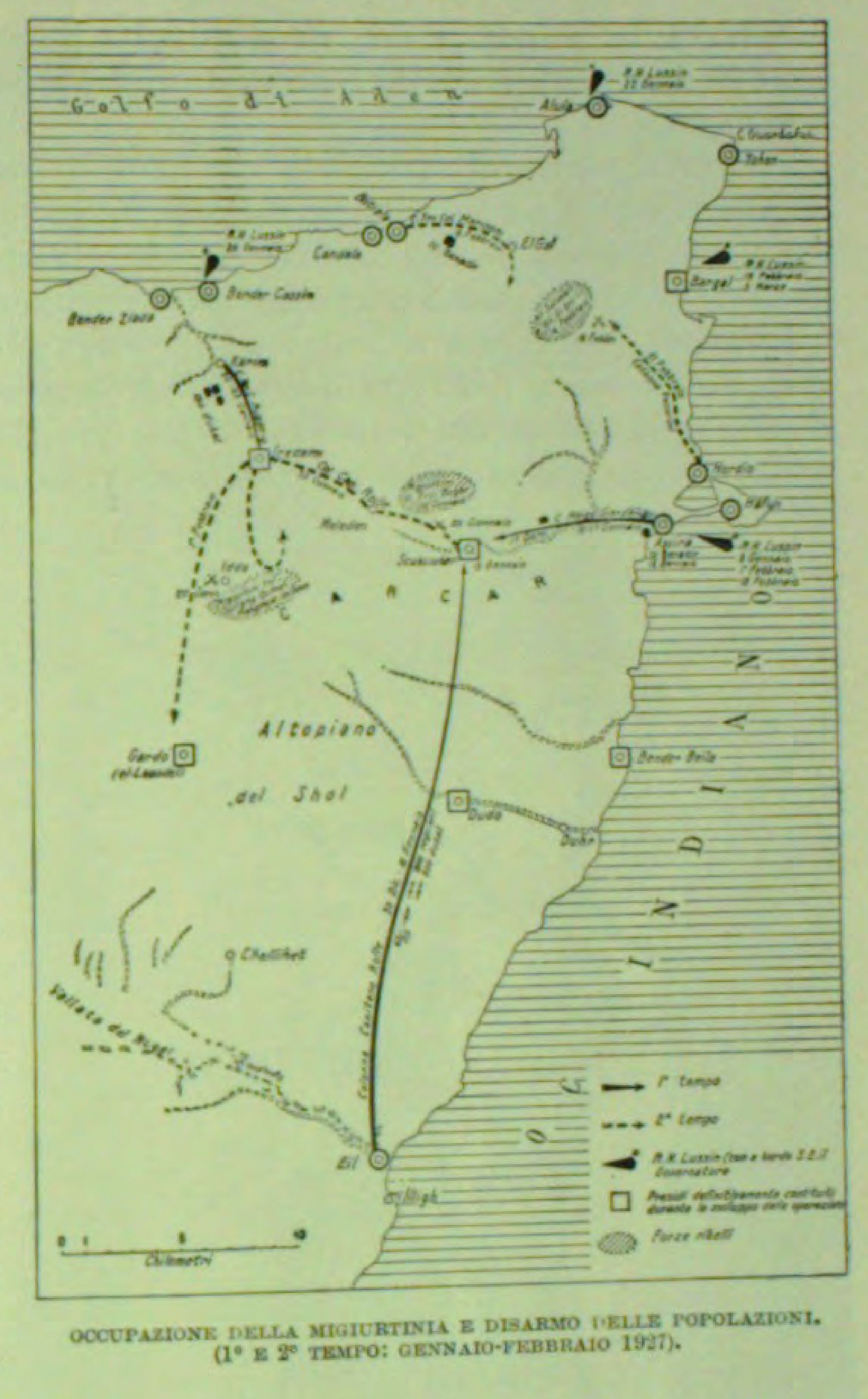
January–February 1927

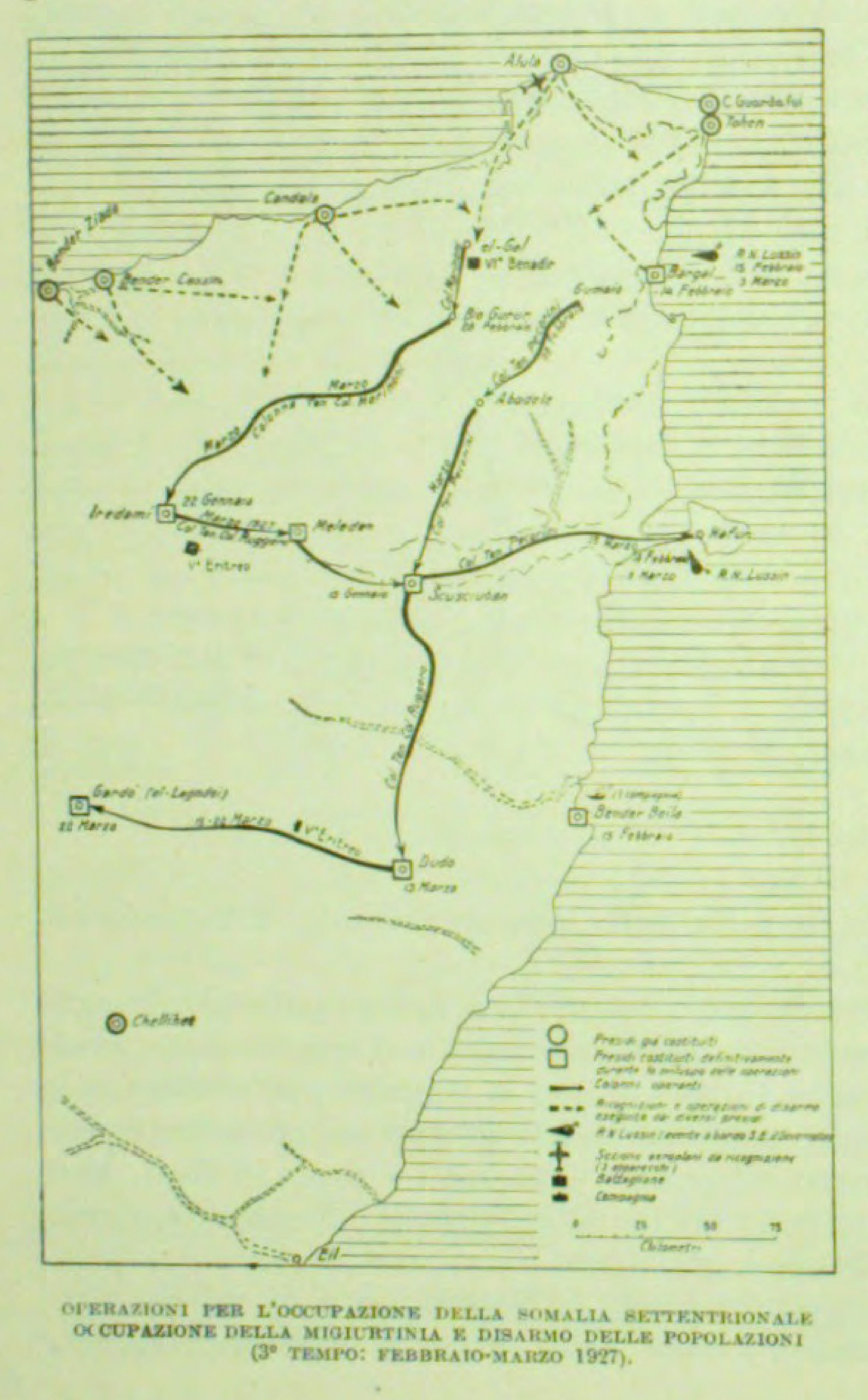
February–March 1927

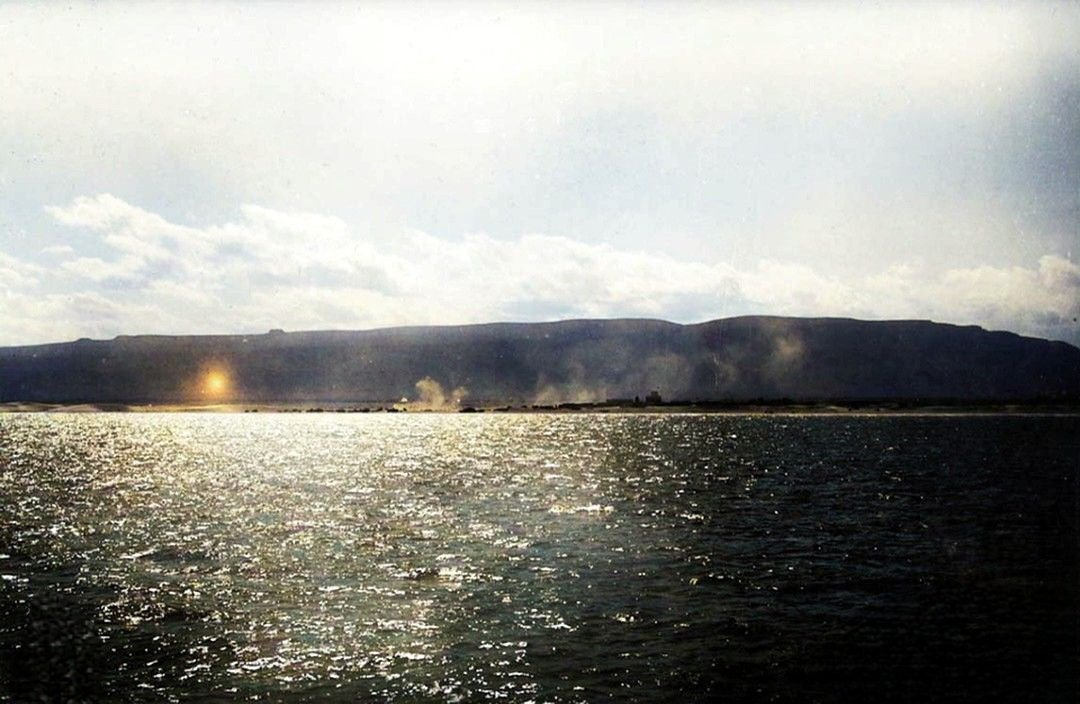
Italian naval bombardment of Bargaal

The Campaign of the Sultanates refers to when in the mid-1920s, under Benito Mussolini's Fascist regime, the Italian government ordered the full military occupation of the Italian protectorates Majeerteen Sultanate and Sultanate of Hobyo through the Royal Corps of Colonial Troops, which led to armed resistance and rebellions across the country. With the arrival of Governor Cesare Maria De Vecchi on 15 December 1923, things began to change in Italian Somalia; Italy had access to these areas under the successive protection treaties, but direct rule only in some areas, including in the majority of Benadir territory. Given the defeat of the Dervish movement in the early 1920s, and the rise of fascism in Europe, on 1925, Mussolini gave the green light to De Vecchi to start the takeover of the northern sultanates. The treaties abrogated, and the former Italian protectorates of Majeerteen and Hobyo were eventually directly annexed to the Italian colony of Somalia.

== Background ==
With the arrival of Governor Cesare Maria De Vecchi on 15 December 1923, things began to change in Somalia, Italy had access to these areas under the successive protection treaties, but not direct rule. The Fascist government had direct rule only over the majority of Benadir territory. Given the defeat of the Dervish movement in the early 1920s, and the rise of fascism in Europe, on 1925, Mussolini gave the green light to De Vecchi to start the takeover of the northern sultanates. Everything was to be changed and the treaties abrogated.

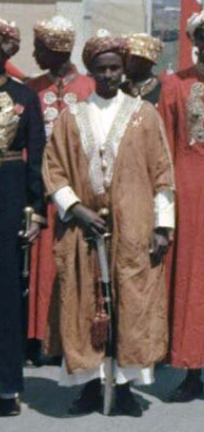
Capo Hersi Gurey in Rome, 1938

== History ==
=== Invasion of the Sultanate of Hobyo ===
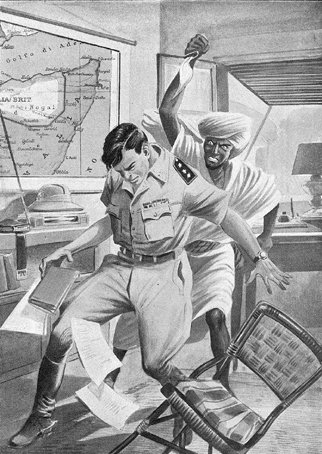
Omar Samatar, a Somali rebel leader, attacking and killing Captain Franco Carolei in Ceelbuur, Somalia.

In September 1925 Ali Yusuf Kenadid of Hobyo agreed to hand over his weapons and on 1 October three columns of dubats, under the command of Colonel Di Bello, entered the sultanate's territory, occupying it completely within a few weeks and deposing the ruler. Commissioner Trivulzio, assigned with administering Hobyo, reported the movement of armed men towards the borders of the sultanate before and after the annexation. As preparations were underway to continue the Corpo Zaptié's advance into Majeerteen Sultanate, a new threat emerged. One of Sultan Ali Yusuf's commanders, Omar Samatar, attacked and captured Ceel Buur on November 9, 1925. In which he personally murdered Italian Captain Francesco Carolei, after which he cut off the captain's right hand and threw it over the forts wall, to signal to his army that the rebellion was now underway.

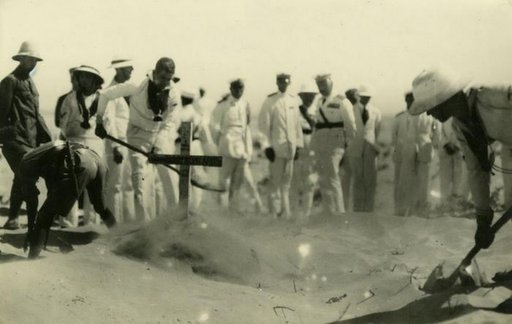
Italian Army burial of Captain Francesco Carolei

The local populace sided with Omar, and soon enough the Italians had a full-scale revolt on their hands after Omar followed up his previous success with the capture of El-Dhere. The Corpo Zaptié tried and failed to recapture El-Bur from Omar. By 15 November the Zaptié had fled to Bud Bud, ambushed by partisans the whole way and rather diminished in forces and resolve.

A third attempt was planned, but before it could be executed the commander of the operation, Lieutenant-Colonel Guido Splendorelli, was ambushed and killed between Bud Bud and Bula Barde. In an attempt to salvage the situation, governor De Vecchi requested two battalions from Eritrea and assumed personal command. The rebellion soon spilled over the borders into the Benadir and Western Somaliland, and Omar grew increasingly powerful. The disaster in Hobyo shocked Italian policymakers in Rome. Blame soon fell on Governor De Vecchi, whose perceived incompetence was blamed for Omar's rise. Rome instructed De Vecchi that he was to receive the reinforcement from Eritrea, but that the commander of the Eritrean battalions was to assume the military command and De Vecchi was confined to Mogadishu, and limited to an administrative role. The commander was to report directly to Rome, bypassing De Vecchi entirely.

Considering the eons-old clan rivalries which have been the bane of Somali states from time immemorial turned out to be far more successful than the Eritrean regiments in reversing the rebellion. The Habar Gidir led by Hersi Gurey, who were long enemies of the Hobyo Sultanate, arrived to help the Italians crush the revolt. Although many members of the Habar Gidir sided with Omar Samatar's popular resistance originally.

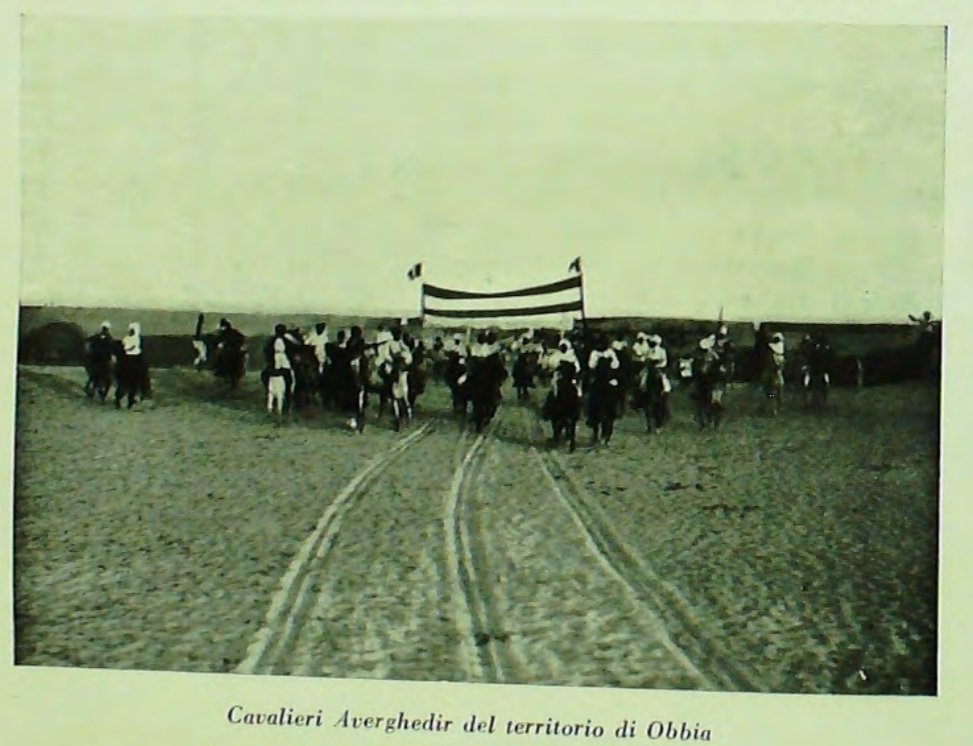
Habar Gidir cavalry in Hobyo

With the steam taken out of the rebellion, and the military forces heavily reinforced with the battalions from Eritrea, the Italians retook Ceel Buur on 26 December 1925, and eventually compelled Omar Samatar to retreat into the Ogaden, where skirmishes between his remaining forces and Italian soldiers would continue.

=== Invasion of the Majeerteen Sultanate ===
The new Alula commissioner, presented Boqor Osman with an ultimatum to disarm and surrender. Meanwhile, Italian troops began to pour into the sultanate in anticipation of this operation. While landing at Haafuun and Alula, the sultanate's troops opened fire on them. Fierce fighting ensued and to avoid escalating the conflict and to press the fascist government to revoke their policy, Boqor Osman tried to open a dialogue. However, he failed, and again fighting broke out between the two parties. Following this disturbance, on 7 October the Governor instructed Coronaro to order the Sultan to surrender; to intimidate the people he ordered the seizure of all merchant boats in the Alula area. At Hafun, Arimondi bombarded and destroyed all the boats in the area.

On 13 October Coronaro was to meet Boqor Osman at Baargaal to press for his surrender. Under siege already, Boqor Osman was playing for time. However, on 23 October, Boqor Osman sent an angry response to the Governor defying his order. Following this a full-scale naval attack was ordered in November. Baargaal was bombed by the Italian cruiser 'Campania' for 22 hours after initial Italian efforts to take the town were pushed back and several Eritrean Ascaris were killed.

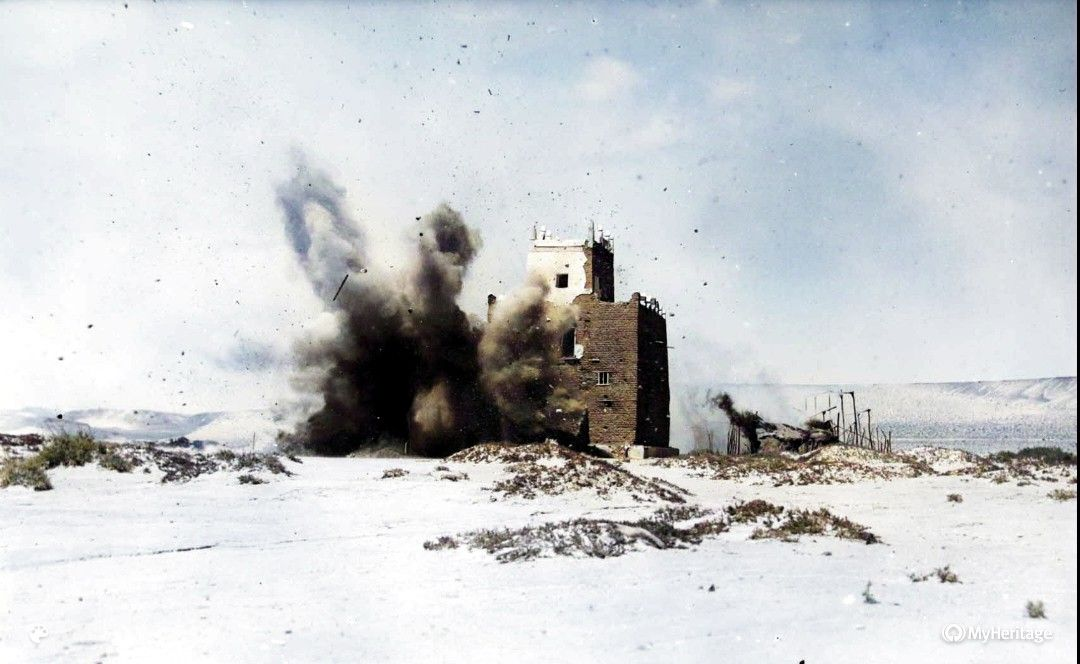
Bombardment of Bargaal Aftermath of the bombings

The attempt of the colonizers to suppress the region erupted into an explosive confrontation. The Italians were meeting fierce resistance on many fronts. In December 1925, led by the charismatic leader Hersi Boqor, son of Boqor Osman, the sultanate forces drove the Italians out of Hurdia and Haafuun, two strategic coastal towns.

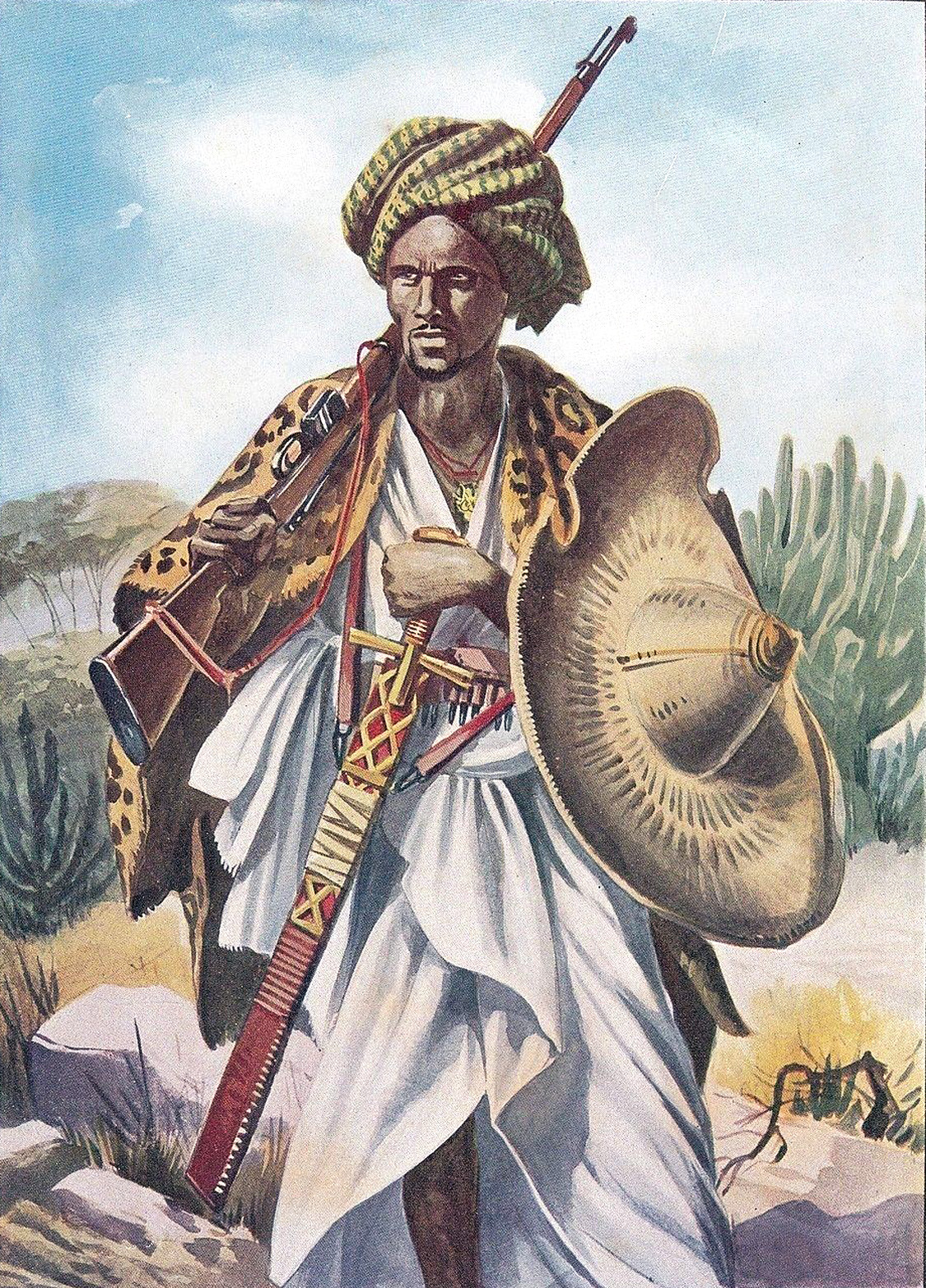
Italian depiction Boqor, son of Boqor Osman, who led the rebellion alongside his father

Another contingent attacked and destroyed an Italian communications centre at Cape Guardafui, at the tip of the Horn. In retaliation, the Bernica and other warships were called on to bombard all main coastal towns of the Majeerteen. After a violent confrontation Italian forces inevitably captured Eyl, which until then had remained in the hands of Hersi Boqor. In response to the unyielding situation, Italy called for reinforcements from their other colonies, notably Eritrea. With their arrival at the closing of 1926, the Italians began to move into the interior where they had not been able to venture since their first seizure of the coastal towns. Their attempt to capture Dharoor Valley was resisted by Hersi Boqor, and ended in failure for the Italians.

=== Continued conflicts ===
A problem for the Italians remained Ogaden where many rebels, alongside former rebel leaders; Hersi Boqor, and Omar Samatar, retreated to after the disastrous war. Particularly the region of Gorrahei within Ogaden. For years these were a major concern for Italian authorities and caused frictions with Fascist Italy, as they successfully in skirmishes and raids managed to penetrate deep into Italian territory on multiple occasions or attacked stationed Italian troops.

Below is an English translation of an excerpt of a diplomatic document from the Italian Ministry of Foreign Affairs dated to November 1929.

They are aware of this laborious negotiations for the rejection of the rebel Migiurtino (Majeerteen) Hersi Boqor, son of former Sultan Osman, who has fled to Ogaden. He was such a superb and ferocious man, with a group of followers he escaped to Ogaden territory from the fighting that destroyed the migiurtin. He had continued to be rebellious despite occasionally openings to submit. Abscir Dorre who rebelled in 1926, was first confined at the request of Count Colli (in Italian Eritrea) and escaped to Addis Ababa. Following this, Ras promised formally to the Minister R. to closely monitor Abscir Dorre and prevent him from returning to the Ogaden. Instead, shortly thereafter, Abscir Dorre fled from the capital, obviously with the conviction of the Ethiopian authorities who did nothing to trace him. Abscir Dorre rebelled against Italians and fell into the 1927 fights with our troops.

With the help of Abshir Dhoore a revered former commander of the Dervish movement and one of the highest in command under the Sayid, would continued these attacks. Such as attacking a convoy headed by Maria De Vecchi composed of both askaris and foreign brigands, where in the daring conflict, the Somali rebels would kill over 50 men from the Italian forces. Although this would result in being Abshir's final attack, and he would die at the wells of Garloogubay, Wardheer.

== Aftermath ==
Due to the immense retaliation of the Majeerteen, Italians were not able to entirely capture Majeerteenia until late 1927, when after the conflict at Iskushkuban Hersi Boqor and his top staff were forced to retreat to Ogaden in order to rebuild the forces. However, they had an epidemic of cholera which frustrated attempts to entirely recover his force and re-capture territory.

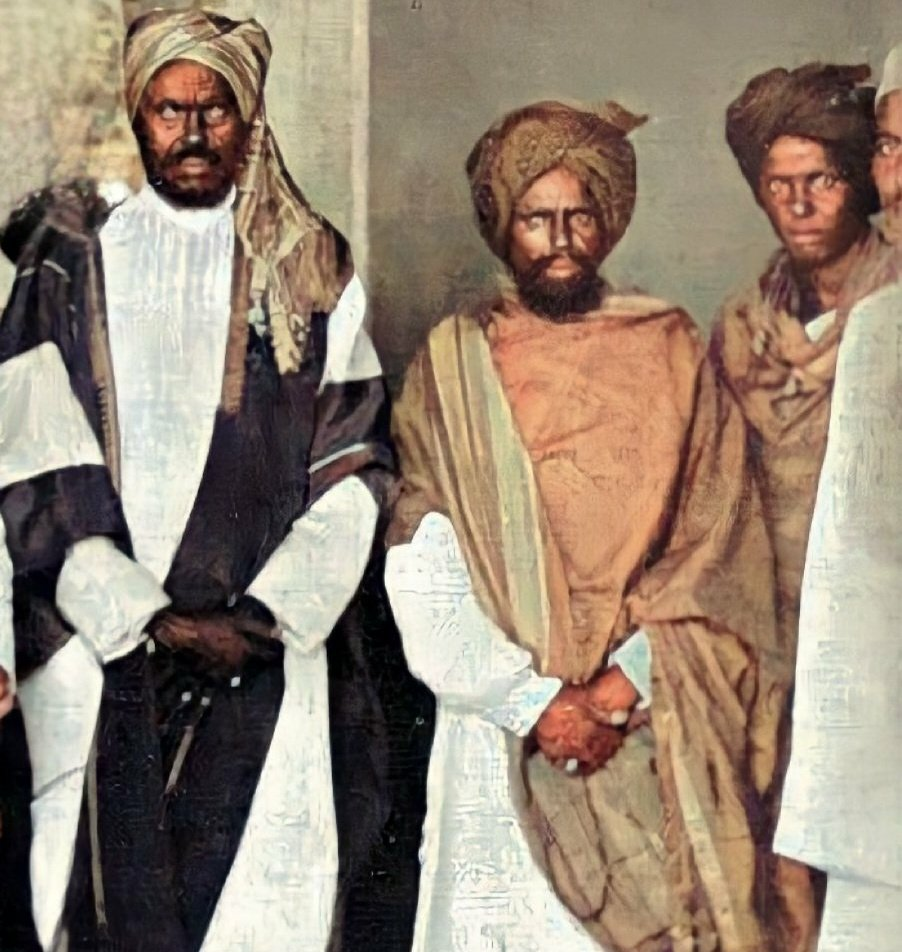
Boqor Osman Mahmud II to the far left, with his brother, Yusuf Mahmud and son, Musa Osman in exile, Mogadishu

The Italian Government eventually conquered and merged many sultanates and British protectorates (British Jubaland) to form Italian Somaliland. Mussolini who first criticised Maria De Vecchi heavy-handed tactics which claimed the deaths of a few Somalis, realised that the pacification of Somalia offered great potential for regional expansion. However, instability persisted throughout the years.

== Legacy of the Sultanates ==
=== Sultanate of Hobyo ===
What was left by the previous Sultanate of Hobyo, in terms of culture and political vision, continued Mogadishu. After the destruction of the Sultanate, former members, under new conditions helped in boosting Somali nationalism. The Osmanya script, founded by Ali Yusuf Kenadiid’s son Osman Yusuf Kenadid, and foundation of the Somali Youth League (SYL), owes much regards to the former Hobyo Sultanate.

The Cumar-Samatar Secondary School in the city of Galkacyo, Galmudug state of Somalia, is named after Omar Samatar in remembrance of his fierce struggles and sacrifices against the Italians.
