= Hersi Gurey =

Somalian clan leader (1870–1957)

Hersi Gurey Capo
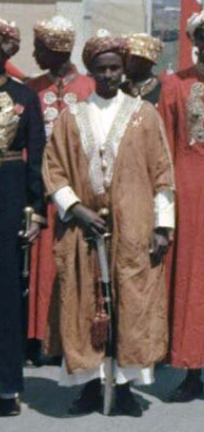
- Hersi Gurey in Rome, 1938
- Native name: Xirsi Guray
- Born: Italian Somaliland
- Allegiance: Kingdom of Italy
- Branch: Royal Corps of Colonial Troops
- Service years: late 19th century – early 20th century
- Rank: Commander
- Commands: Dubats Askaris Zaptié
- Conflicts: Second Italo-Ethiopian War Italian Somali Wars: Campaign of the Sultanates; Battle of Eyl
- Other work: Political delegate (Rome, 1938)

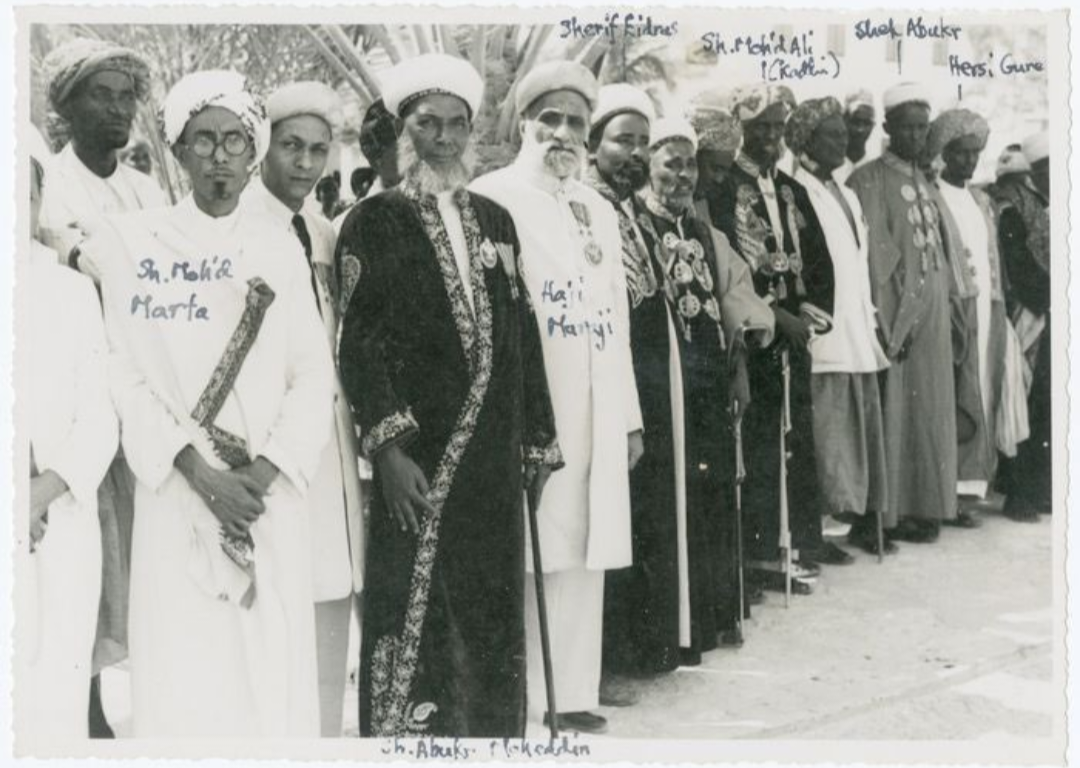
Capo Hirsi with clan dignitaries

Capo Xirsi Guray (1870–1957) better known as Xirsi Gurey was an elder and leader of the Sacad Habar Gidir clan, subclan Reer Hilowle. He was a prominent ally of Fascist Italy, participating in conquest from Puntland to Ethiopia, alongside setting the foundation for modern Somalia.

== Life ==
As the Colonial War grew, with the breakdown of neutral people and no single successor to Italian and British rule emerging, the term "traditional" or "Capo" came into use in Somalia to describe heads of tribal and clan organizations and a complex web of regional and local domination.

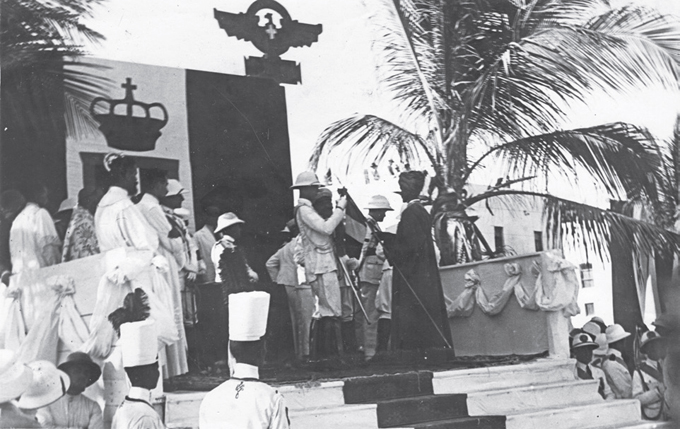
Umberto di Savoia gives Capo Hersi a Medal of Honor in 1928

Xirsi is listed as the Capo (Lead chief) of the Habar Gidir, who received a silver medal in 1928 on behalf of the slain war hero, the Italian Dubat soldier Botan Warsame, from the Sacad Reer Jalaf clan for his leading contribution to the Italo - Somali War: Campaign of the Sultanates and the capture of Gorrahei from the Ogaden supporters, where both the sultanates and Gorrahei fighters had initially sought assistance from the Ethiopian Monarchy.

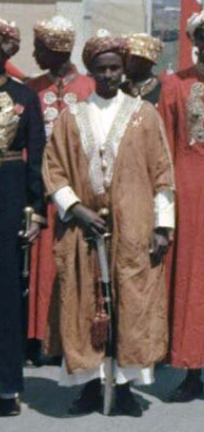
Capo Hersi Gurey in Rome, 1938

As a result of the successful conquest of Ethiopia, Capo Hersi alongside Olol Dinle and several chiefs were given an official invitation to meet Hitler and Mussolini in Rome, 1938.

Many of his descendants until today play a prominent role in Somalia.

== Military history of Hersi Gurey ==
Hersi gurey is most notable for his participation in the Campaign of the Sultanates. Hersi was a major ally for Fascist Italy, in their campaigns against the northern Somali sultanates of Hobyo, and Majeerteenia. He led his soldiers throughout the rugged terrain, and despite having heavy casualties, his victory was never forgotten. Not by his Dubats or Italian allies.

Alongside Sultan Olol Dinle Hersi played a prominent role during the Second Italo-Ethiopian War in which Italy successfully conquered and colonised Ethiopia from 1936 to 1941 where Hersi sent troops to his ally and kinsman Sultan Olol Dinle.
