= Massacre of Warsheikh =

1890 attack on an Italian ship in Somalia

- Part of Italian Somali Wars
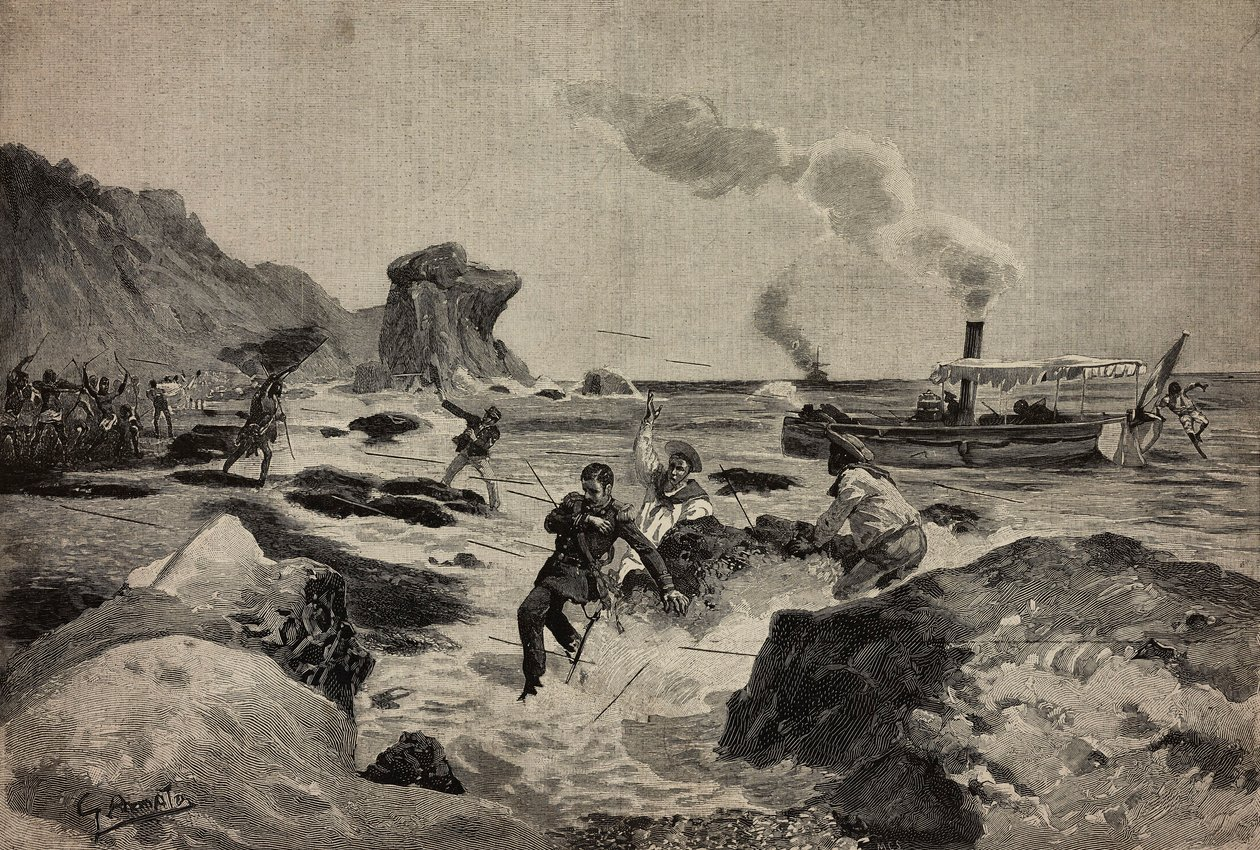
- Somali attack on Italian ships at warsheikh
Date	24 April 1890; 136 years ago
Location	Warsheikh, Somalia 2°18′00″N 45°48′00″E
Result	Somali victory: Destruction and failure of the Italian expedition

Belligerents
Kingdom of Italy	Warsheikh Somalis

Commanders and leaders
(Kingdom of Italy) Lieutenant Carlo Zavagli † (Kingdom of Italy) Captain Angelo Bartorello (DOW)	Chief of Warsheikh

Casualties and losses
Two dead ship damaged	None

The Massacre of Warsheikh (Somali: Xasuuqii Warsheekh Italian: Massacro di Uarsheikh) or Attack on Warsheikh was the attack on an Italian ship by native Somalis under the Chief of Warsheikh in April 1890 near the city of Warsheikh in Somalia.

Italian ship lieutenant Carlo Zavagli and sailor captain Angelo Bartorello were attacked and killed offshore of Warsheikh by local Somalis. This led to the first colonial naval bombardment in Somalia's history as retaliation.

== Background ==
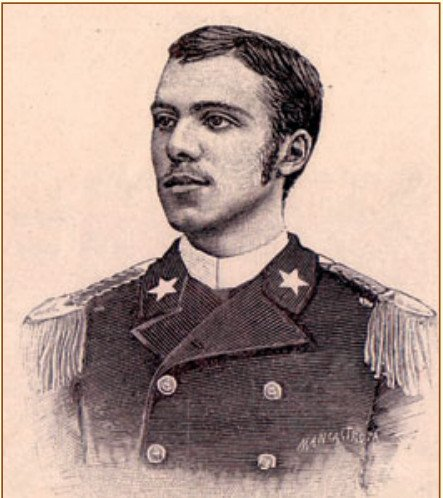
Portrait of Lieutenant Carlo Zavagli

On April 24, 1890 Italian steamboat Volta was sent to the shores of Warsheikh under the command of Lieutenant Zavagli, with instructions to seek a meeting with the local chief, whose population primarily belonged to the Abgaal sub-clan of the Hawiya Somalis, to "demonstrate the crew's friendly intentions and to offer gifts for the chiefs and the population". Alongside Zavagli were Coxswain Angelo Bertolucci, Seaman 3rd Class Angelo Bertorello, Engineer 3rd Class Alfredo Simoni, Stoker 2nd Class Giuseppe Gorini, Chief Helmsman 2nd Giovanni Gonnella, and an Arab interpreter Said Achmed.

== Massacre ==
After Zavagli arrived, the Somalis attacked, launched at a signal from the Somali chief. Zavagli died on the boat, while it tried to get out to sea while the rest of the crew fired wildly to cover their escape. Bertorello was hit by the Somalis while working on the anchor; he suffered fatal wounds.

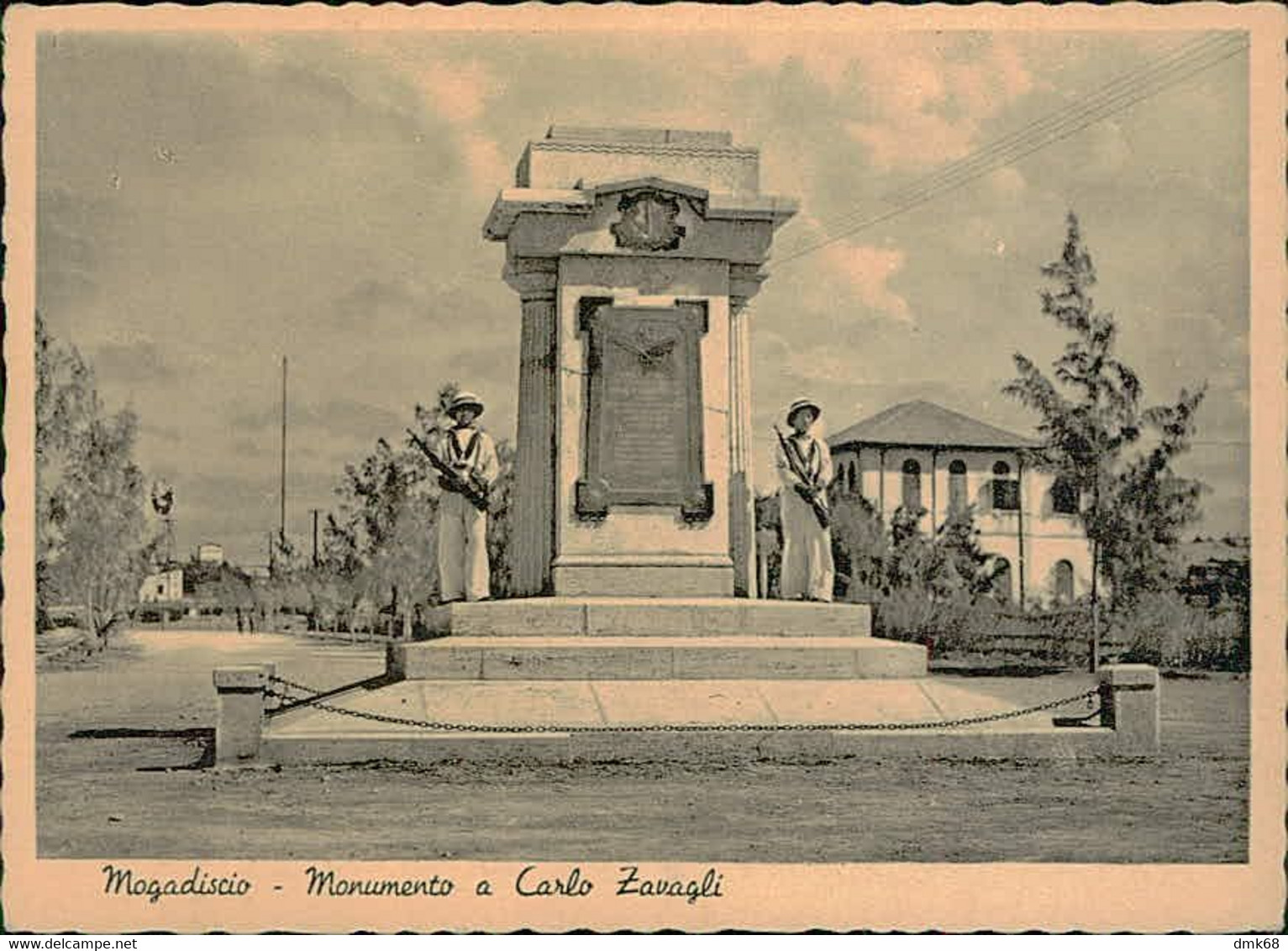
Italian Monument for Carlo Zavagli

The death of Lieutenant Zavagli, and Bertorello, was one of many "incidents" that stalled Italian colonial ambitions in Somalia.

== Aftermath ==
Sheekh Ahmed Gabyow recited this poem after the battles of Cadale and Warsheikh, the first call for Somali nationalism.

We are fighting for the Somalis We fight those who commit evil Oh ye reject colonial infidels Before the wind of death takes you Turning to ashes to be eaten by worms So rear the path for future generations

— Ahmed Gabyow

Another Italian defeat at Lafoole in 1896, dubbed the "Somali Adwa" by the Italians, resultec in the death of Italian Consul General Antonio Cecchi, the most important expeditionist and fervent promoter of the Italian Colonial Administration. Italian ships bombed the coasts of Nimmo and Jasira, before withdrawing to their areas of influence.

== See also ==
- Italian-Somali Wars
- Banadir resistance
- Italian Somaliland
