= Warsheikh District =

Warsheekh, Warshiiq, Warshiikh Warsheekh Warsheikh
- District
- Warsheekh
- Country: Somalia
- Region: Middle Shebelle
- Capital: Warsheikh
- Time zone: UTC+3 (EAT)

Warsheekh District is a district in the southeastern Middle Shebelle (Shabeellaha Dhexe) region of Somalia. Its capital lies at Warsheikh.
