= Danane =

Coordinates: 1°52′26″N 45°01′40″E

Danane (Somali: Danaane, Arabic: دنانه) is a coastal town in the southern Lower Shebelle province of Somalia. It is located approximately 109 km (68 mi) to the southwest of the nation's capital, Mogadishu.

== History ==
In the past, the Italians set a concentration camp in the town for people that resisted the Italian colonial leaders in Ethiopia. Many Ethiopians were detained in Danane.

== Demographics ==
Danane is the traditional territory and primarily inhabited Bimal clan
