= Ahmed Gabyow =

Sheikh Ahmed Gabyow was a famous Somali poet and warrior mullah from the Abgaal Hawiye clan.

== Biography ==
Gabyow lived in the coastal areas north of Mogadishu in the first few decades of the Italian occupation. He was well known for the masafo reciting and producing several dozen as a genre of Somali poetry that is usually composed by religious men.

Sheekh Ahmed Gabyow, also known as Sheekh Gabyow, or just Gabyow or by his full name Sheekh Axmed Abiikar 'Sheikh Wacdiyow', recited this poem at the end of June 1891 after the battle of cadale and battle of Warsheikh, killing the Warship Lieutenant Carlo Zavagli along with 60 Italian colonial troops said to have been the first call for Somali nationalism.

We are fighting for the Somalis We fight those who commit evil Oh ye reject colonial infidels Before the wind of death takes you Turning to ashes to be eaten by worms So rear the path for future generations

After another heroic defeat at Lafoole 1896 dubbed the "Somali Adwa" and "Strago di Lafole" by the Italians, resulting in the death of Italian Consul General Antonio Cecchi, the most important expeditionist and fervent promoter of the Italian Colonial Administration, Italian ships bombed the coasts of Nimow and Jasira before withdrawing to their limited areas of influence on the coast for some years.

His grandson, Mohamed Shiekh Gabiow, became a prominent politician as the SYL Minister who designed the Somali constitution of 1960 and became the Ruling Party's parliamentary whip. Married to the granddaughter of the great Somali nationalist religious leader and his grandfathers comrade, Sheikh Hassan Barsane, he also would later become a close advisor to President Ali Mahdi.

He died in London 2016.
