= Warsheikh =

Warsheikh Warshiikh Warshiiq ورشيخ
- Town
- Location in Somalia.
- Coordinates: 2°18′00″N 45°48′00″E
- Country: Somalia
- Regional State: Hirshabelle
- Region: Middle Shabelle
- District: Warsheikh District

Government
  - Type: District–council
  - Mayor: Mohamed Hassan Matan
- Time zone: UTC+3 (EAT)
- Area code: +252
- Website: https://warsheikhdistrict.so/

Warsheikh (Somali: Warsheekh, Warshiiq, Warshiikh, Arabic: ورشيخ,) is an administration center and coastal town of Warsheikh district. Warsheikh is located in the southeastern Middle Shabelle region of Hirshabelle State of Somalia. On the south, Warsheikh is bordered by the Banadir region, and on the north Adale District.

== History ==
Warsheikh is an early Muslim center in southern Somalia, Warsheikh was one of the principal settlements of the Sultanate of Mogadishu during the Middle Ages. The town has an old mosque situated near a cape, which features an inscription noting its construction in 1278H (1861–1862 CE) by Sheikh Abu Bakr b. Mihzar b. Ahmad al-Kasadi. The masjid has three rows of transverse, east–west piers, and a foliate mihrab. It also has attached chambers, with the Sheikh's tomb situated in an adjacent room.

During the Middle Ages, Warsheikh and much of the surrounding area in southern Somalia was governed by the Ajuran Sultanate. The town later came under the administration of the Hiraab Imamate in the late 17th century after the collapse of the powerful Ajuran Empire. In April 1890, an Italian ship lieutenant Carlo Zavagli and sailor captain Angelo Bartorello were killed offshore by local Somalis in the Massacre of Warsheikh, that led to the first colonial naval bombardment in retaliation. At the turn of the 20th century, Warsheikh was incorporated into the Italian Somaliland protectorate. After independence in 1960, the town was made the administration center of the official Warsheikh District.

Over the course of three archaeological expeditions in Warsheikh between 1920 and 1921, Enrico Cerulli uncovered coins from the medieval Sultans of Mogadishu. They were deposited in the Scuola Orientale of the University of Rome, but were later lost in World War II. According to Cerulli, similar coins were found in the village of Mos (Moos), located about 14 km to Warsheikh's northwest. Freeman-Grenville (1963) also record another discovery of ancient coins in the latter town.

== Demographics ==
The population of Warsheikh center does not have official figures but is estimated at 65,000. While the broader Warsheikh District has an estimated population of 150,573 residents as of 2016. The district is exclusively inhabited by Abgaal of the Hawiye clan. Especially Cumar Galmaax (Celi and Mataan).

== See also ==
- New Mogadishu International Airport, in Warsheikh area
