= Dubat =

Italian Irregular colonial units

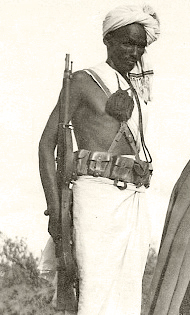
Dubat from Italian Somalia with rifle, futa and lanyard, 1938

Dubat (Somali: دُوب عد, romanized: ḍubbāṭ; Arabic: العمائم البيضاء; Italian: turbanti bianchi, lit. 'White turban') was the designation for members of the semi-regular armed bands employed by the Italian Royal Corps of Colonial Troops in Italian Somaliland from 1924 to 1941. The word dubat was derived from a Somali phrase meaning "white turban".

== Origin and duties ==
Dubats were local soldiers from Italian Somaliland employed in Italian military service after World War I.

First raised in July 1924 by Colonel Camillo Bechis, they mainly served as frontier guards and light infantry, developing a reputation as effective fighters. Dubats were maintained as permanent units and were better trained and armed than the tribal banda irregulars raised as temporary auxiliaries when needed by the Italian authorities in Somalia and other colonies.

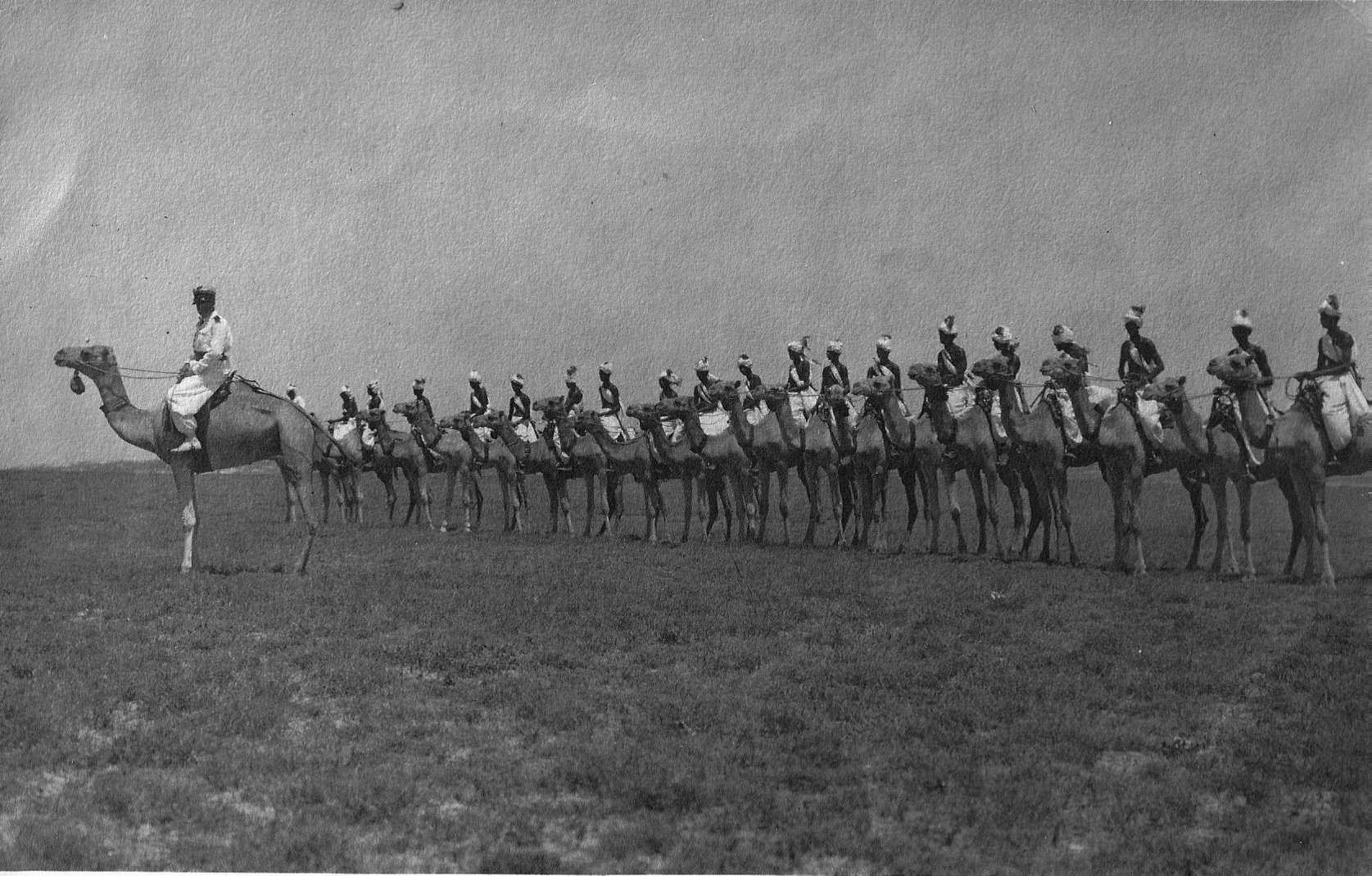
Dubat camel troops under Colonel Camillo Bechi's command

Dubats were concentrated along the British Somaliland, Ethiopian and East Africa Protectorate frontiers.

Camel cavalry detachments (recul) were also employed for patrol work in the Ogaden region.

== Attire, weaponry and ranks ==
From their establishment, Dubats wore the white futa, a traditional Somali sarong-like garment. They also wore smaller lengths of futa cloth as turbans (dub), tightly wrapped around their heads. The term dubat (literally "white turban") was derived from this headdress.

During 1935–36, a khaki version of the futa and turban, including a saharianna tunic, was adopted for service wear.

The Somali non-commissioned officer ranks were distinguished by coloured lanyards hanging from the neck and ending in tassels, as follows:

- capo comandante (commander) – green
- capo (sergeant) – red
- sotto-capo(corporal) – black

Commissioned officers of the Dubats were all Italians. They were usually seconded from the 6 regular Arab-Somali battalions of the Royal Corps of Colonial Troops, recruited in the territories of present-day Somalia and Yemen.

Dubats were armed with either Carcano M1891 or Mannlicher M1895 rifles. They also carried curved traditional Somali daggers called billao.

== Campaigns ==
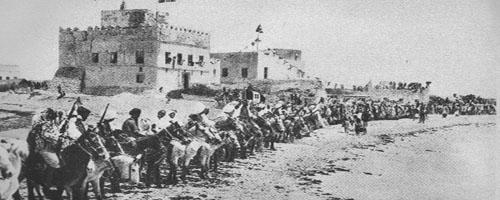
Cavalry and fort of the Sultanate of Hobyo, one of the ruling Somali polities that the dubats fought against in the Campaign of the Sultanates.

During 1925–27, roughly 3,000 Dubats saw service in the Campaign of the Sultanates, involving the occupation of the autonomous regions of Obbia, where the Sultan Yusuf Ali Kenadid ruled over the Sultanate of Hobyo, and Migiurtinia (1923–27), where Boqor Osman Mahamud ruled the Sultanate. Under Hersi gurey their raids the Dubats reached Eyl and Hafun.

During late 1927, Dubats were used to raid across the border into Ethiopia, where clan militiamen from Migiurtinia had regrouped in Gorrahei. The use of Dubat irregulars for these intrusions enabled the Italians to avoid diplomatic complications with Ethiopia.

The four original bands were increased to ten during the early stages of the Italian invasion of Ethiopia in 1935. On 5 December 1934, a clash occurred between a detachment of Dubats occupying the Walwal oasis in the Ogaden, and Ethiopian troops escorting a border commission. This incident provided the pretext for the subsequent Second Italian-Abyssinian War. Nearly 20,000 Dubats and other irregulars served with the Italian forces during the 1936 conquest of Ethiopia.

During the Italian occupations of Harar Somali Dubats killed over 200 Amhara Christian settlers including 3 priests during the first six days of the occupation.

With the occupation of Ethiopia, the Dubats were re-deployed in the Ogaden Desert and along the frontiers of French and British Somaliland. They saw ongoing action against Ethiopian guerrillas in Hararghe.

On the eve of Italy's entry into World War II, the Dubats underwent reorganisation, becoming more closely integrated with the regular Somali units of the Royal Corps of Colonial Troops. The 1st Dubat Group subsequently served as part of General De Simone's Column during the successful Italian invasion of British Somaliland in August 1940. Dubats participated in the attack on the British colony of Kenya and the conquest of Moyale and Buna.

During the East African Campaign of 1941, the Dubats served with the Army Group under Pietro Gazzera. Following the British military occupation of Italian Somaliland in 1941, the Dubats were disbanded.

== British Dubas ==
Between 1936 and the late 1950s the British colonial government maintained a force of tribal police known as "Dubas" in the Northern Frontier District of Kenya, bordering Somaliland. Some were camel mounted. The Dubas performed similar functions as their Italian colonial counterparts, on whom they were modeled. They wore the same white indigenous dress, though with red turbans.

== Honors ==
One Gold Medal of Military Valor:

With the courage of their race – fueled by love for the flag and the belief in the higher destinies of Italy in Africa, gave during the war, many proofs of the most brilliant heroism. With great generosity, and similar faithfulness, gave their blood for the consecration of the Italian Empire. - Italo-Ethiopian War, October 3, 1935 – May 5, 1936. – November 19, 1936.

== See also ==
- Italian Empire
- Amedeo Guillet
- Bands (Italian Army irregulars)
- Royal Corps of Eritrean Colonial Troops
- Zaptié

== Bibliography ==
- Crociani, Piero (1980). Le Uniformi dell'AOI (Somalia 1889–1941) (in Italian). la Roccia.
- Esposito, Gabrielle (2022). Italian Colonial Troops 1882–1960. Men-at-Arms. Osprey Publishing. ISBN 9781472851284.
- Jowett, Philip S.; Andrew, Stephen (2001). The Italian Army 1940–45. Men-at-Arms. Vol. 2: Africa 1940–43. Osprey Publishing. ISBN 9781472851284.
- Nicolle, David (1997). The Italian Invasion of Abyssinia 1935–36. Men-at-Arms. Osprey Publishing. ISBN 1-85532-692-2.
