= Zaptié =

Locally raised Italian colonial police

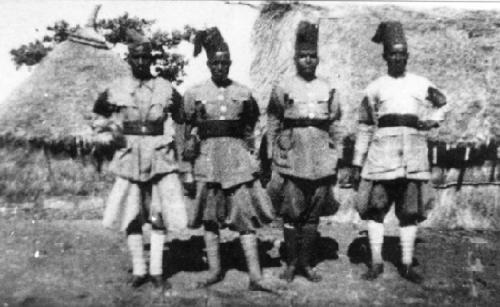
Group of Zaptié in Italian Somaliland (1939).

Zaptié was the name of locally raised gendarmerie units in the Italian colonies of Tripolitania, Cyrenaica (later Italian Libya), Eritrea and Somaliland between 1888 and 1943.

== Origins and duties ==
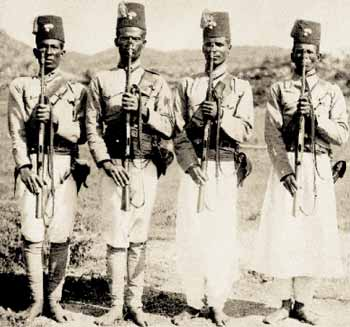
Eritrean Zaptié, 1920s

The word "zaptié" is derived from the Turkish zaptiye; a term which was used to refer to Otoman gendarmerie prior to 1923 and to the Turkish personnel recruited for the Cyprus Military Police during the period of British rule on the island. The Turkish word "zaptiye" is derived from the Arabic word ضابط dhaabet, which means "officer".

The Italian colonial governments modelled the zaptié constabulary forces on the Italian Carabinieri. The first of these units was raised in Eritrea in 1882, drawing from companies of bashi-bazouks (basci bazuks) (irregular troops).

In Tripolitania and Cyrenaica the Italian officered zaptié were generally used for patrolling rural areas in coastal regions, while mounted police or spahis operated in the southern desert regions, together with camel mounted meharists. In the city of Tripoli, civilian police were employed. The original Libyan zaptié were recruited from indigenous gendarmerie of the same name, who had served under the Turkish government prior to 1910.

In Italian Somaliland, the zaptié provided a ceremonial escort for the Italian Viceroy (Governor) as well as the territorial police. There were nearly 1,000 para-military police in 1922, when Benito Mussolini took control of the Italian government and started a policy of "pacification" and assimilation in the Italian colonies.

== Attire, weaponry and ranks ==
Zaptié troopers were armed with Model 1874 revolvers, cavalry carbines and 1871 model sabres. Officers and some non-commissioned officers were Italian but the rank and file were recruited locally. The Somali Zaptié Corps in 1927 numbered 1,500 Somali and 72 Italian personnel. Uniforms varied from colony to colony but usually comprised red fezes and sashes with khaki or white clothing. A common feature was the white and red collar insignia of the Carabinieri.

== Campaigns ==
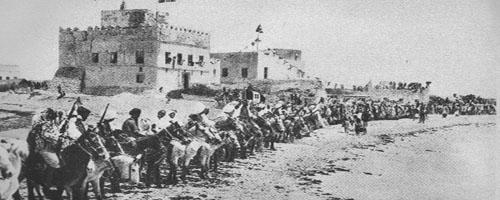
Cavalry and fort of the Sultanate of Hobyo, one of the ruling Somali polities that the zaptié fought against in the Campaign of the Sultanates.

Three hundred zaptié took part in the Italian conquest of northern Somalia in 1925. As part of the "colonna Musso", they assisted in the occupation of the Sultanate of Hobyo (Hafun and Ordio). Other zaptìé units served with the "colonna Bergesio" in the Elemari region (Gallacaio, Garad and Sinedogò). In 1926, zaptìé served in the Majeerteen Sultanate (Bender Ziada, Candala and Bender Cassim).

Zaptìé detachments participated in the Second Italo-Abyssinian War in 1936 and in the East African Campaign of the Second World War.

In 1941 in Somalia and Ethiopia 2,186 zaptìé (plus 500 recruits under training) formed part of the Carabinieri. They were organised in a battalion commanded by Major Alfredo Serranti that fought at the Battle of Culqualber in Ethiopia for three months, until this military unit was destroyed by the Allies. After severe fighting the Carabinieri received "full military honours" from the British. In this battle, Muntaz (corporal) Unatù Endisciau of the LXXII Zaptié (I° Gruppo Carabinieri) Battalion was the only "soldier of colour" to be awarded the Italian Gold Medal of Military Valor.

After the Second World War, a former member of the zaptìé corps, Siad Barre, became President of Somalia from 1969 to 1991.

== See also ==
- Bands (Italian Army irregulars)
- Dubats
- Eritrean Ascari
- Italian Africa Police
