= Banadir resistance =

Guerrilla war in Southern Somalia

- Part of Italian Somali Wars, Scramble for Africa
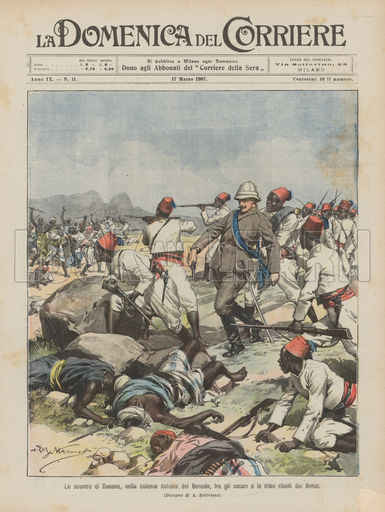
- Italians and Somali colonial troops fighting against the Bimaal at Danane.
Date	1890s–1908
Location	Horn of Africa, southern Italian Somalia
Result	Italian victory

Belligerents
Kingdom of Italy; Italian Somalia	Bimal rebel forces; Wa'daan rebel forces; Geledi Rebels

Commanders and leaders
(Kingdom of Italy) Giacomo Trevis X (Kingdom of Italy) Gustavo Pesenti (Kingdom of Italy) Antonino Di Giorgio (Kingdom of Italy) Maurizio Talmone † (Kingdom of Italy) Antonio Cecchi †	Sheikh Abdi Abikar Gafle; Ma’alin Mursal Abdi Yusuf; Haji ibrahim Gaashan

The Banadir resistance, also known as the Bimaal revolt, Merca revolt, or simply the Bimaal resistance, was a guerrilla war that lasted from the 1890s to 1908, opposing Italian colonial expansion in southern Somalia. The resistance was most active in the Lower Shebelle, Banadir and Middle Shebelle regions. Its intensity and significance have drawn comparisons to the Somali Dervish Movement.

== Background ==
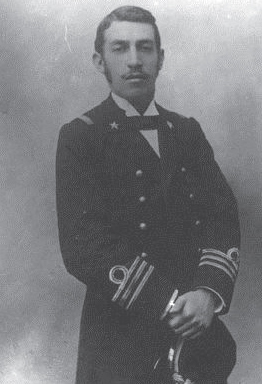
Maurizio Talmone, an Italian officer killed in Merca by a Biimal gamase soldier

In the 1890s, Italian-occupied Marka was the centre of the Bimal culture. This sparked the beginning of conflict and outrage among the Bimal clan, and soon after the Wa'daan. The clans would represent the core of the initial Somali resistance against Italian colonialism. An Italian resident of the city named Giacomo Trevis was assassinated in 1904 by a Somali rebel; in response Italy occupied the port town of Jazeera about 30 miles (48 km) south of Mogadishu. In response Bimal leaders called for a grand conference mobilizing the Banadiri clans. The resistance was spearheaded by Sheikh Abdi Gafle and Ma’alin Mursal Abdi Yusuf, two prominent local Islamic teachers in Marka from the Bimal clan. The resistance, albeit initially clan-based, transformed into one with a religious fervor. Whilst the initial resistance consisted mainly of the Bimal, numbers of the Wa’dan, Hintire and other Somali clans particularly some of the Geledi later joined, forming a confederation to resist the Italian advancements and occupation. The decision to isolate the ports from trade with the interior. The Qur’anic school teachers, called in Somali ma'alims, and religious leaders or imams of Marka and the Bimal led the war of resistance against the colonial occupation of Banadir, but they and their followers paid dearly.

A local poet who attacked those who refused to take up arms said:

Reer Jannah waa jid galeen. Reer Jahanamna iska jooga
Those who resist are heaven-bound. Those who submit can stay home in Hell where they belong.

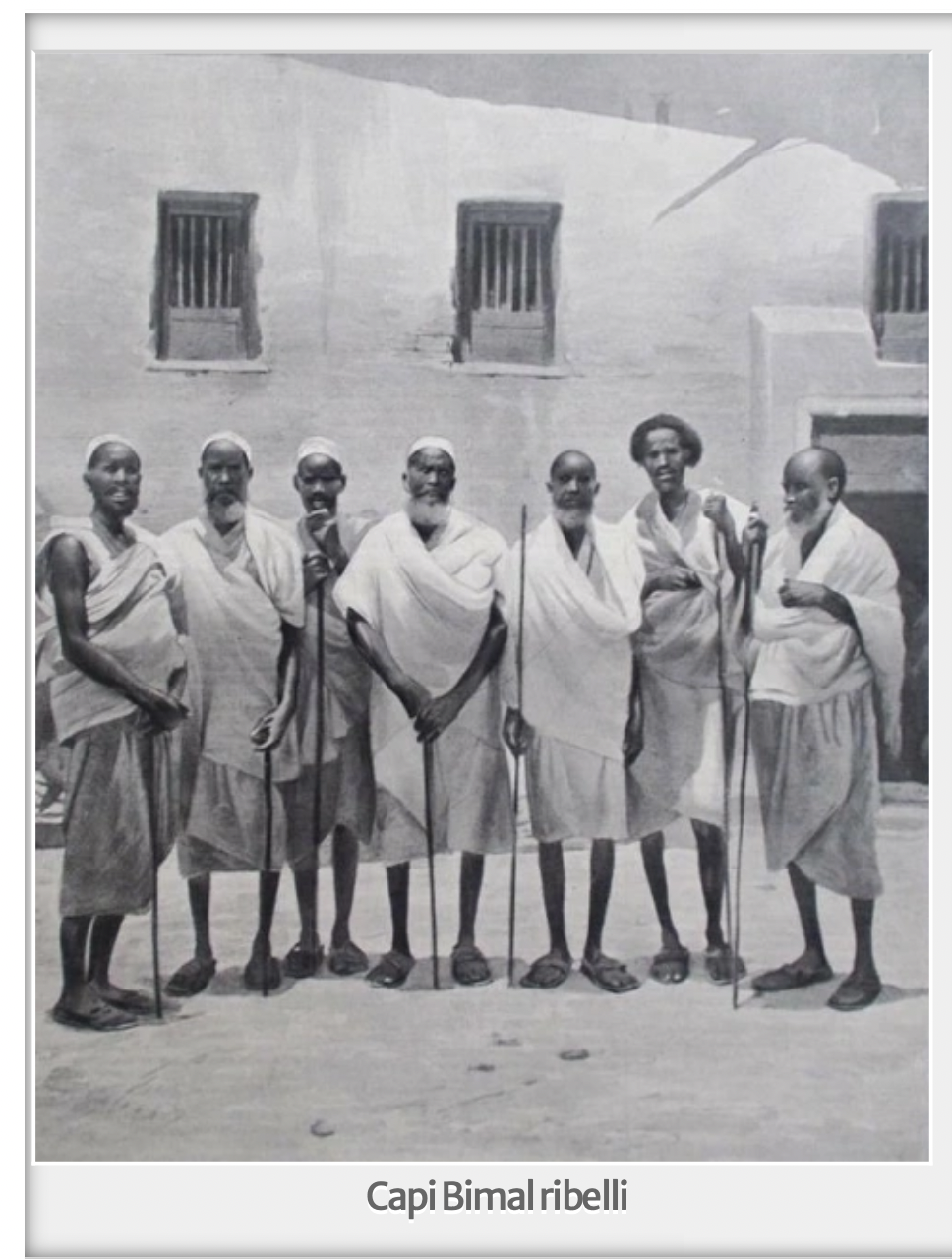
Biimal rebel leaders in Merca

== Early confrontations ==
=== Massacre of Warsheikh ===
One of the earliest conflicts between Italians and Somalis on the Banaadir coast, was the Massacre of Warsheikh.

On April 24, 1890, An Italian steamboat was ordered to be equipped and sent to the shores of Warsheikh under the command of Lieutenant Zavagli, with instructions to “seek a meeting with the local chief of the area, whose population primarily belonged to the Abgaal subclan of the Hawiya Somalis, to demonstrate the crew's friendly intentions and to offer gifts for the chiefs and the population.” Alongside Zavagli were Coxswain Angelo Bertolucci, Seaman 3rd Class Angelo Bertorello, Engineer 3rd Class Alfredo Simoni, Stoker 2nd Class Giuseppe Gorini, Chief Helmsman 2nd Giovanni Gonnella, and an Arab interpreter Said Achmed.

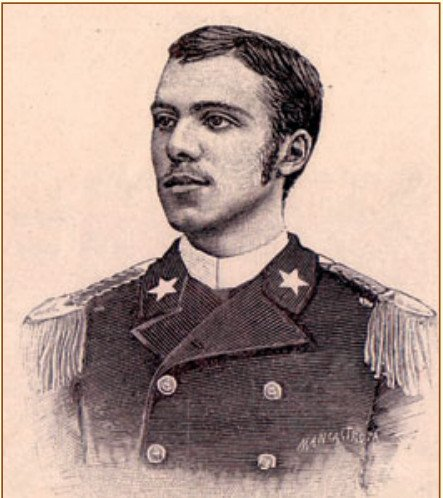
Portrait of Lieutenant Carlo Zavagli

What happened after Zavagli arrived, from Minister Brin's report to the King, it was a veritable ambush, launched at a signal from the village Somali chief, against the three Italians who had disembarked.

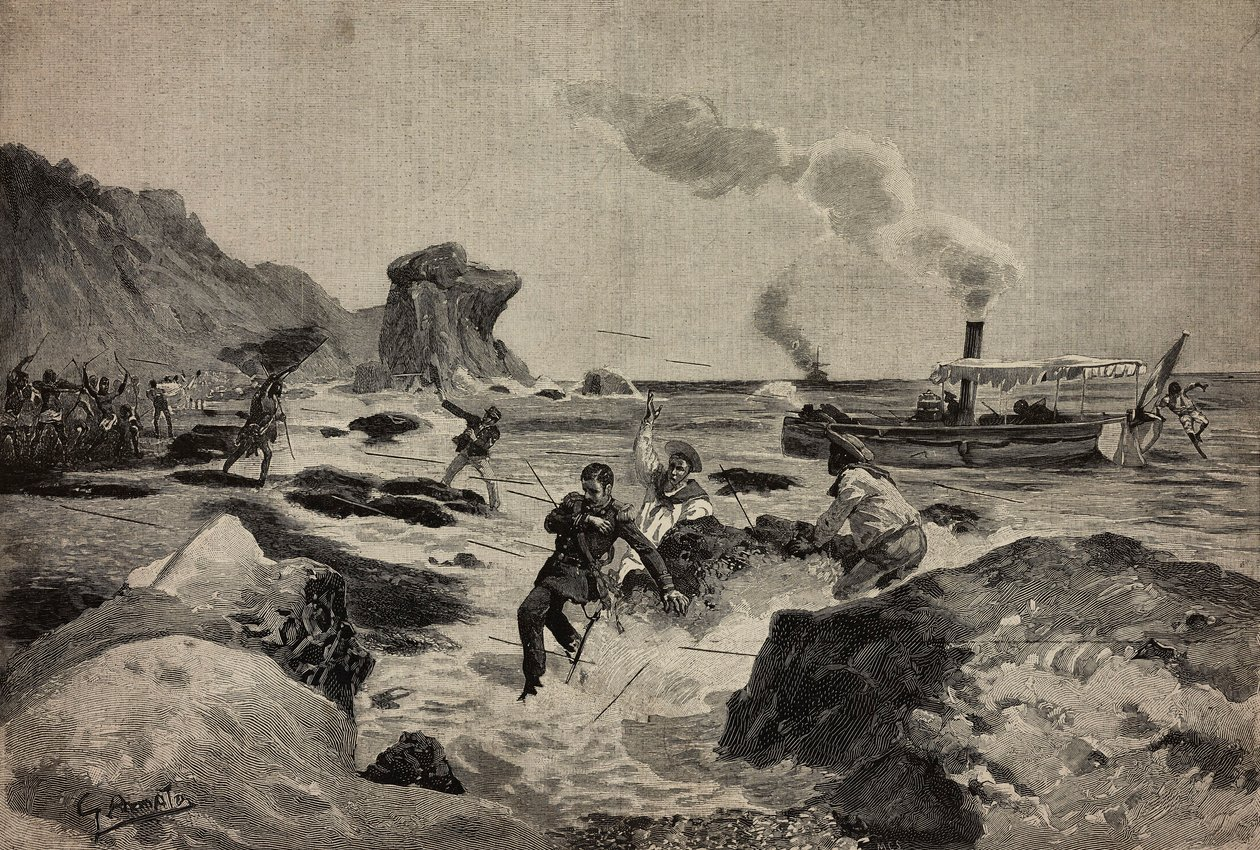
Somali attack on Italian ships at Warsheikh

Zavagli was immediately wounded and died on the boat, bertorello was hit by the Somalis while working on the anchor, he suffered wounds, which caused him to die shortly after. Upon return, their boat was studded in arrows, and Lieutenant Zavagli's body in a pool of blood, his head decapitated.

Sheekh Ahmed Gabyow, also known as Sheekh Gabyow, recited this poem at the end of June 1891, after the death of Lieutenant Carlo Zavagli, along with 60 Italian colonial troops said to have been the first call for Somali nationalism.

We are fighting for the Somalis We fight those who commit evil Oh ye reject colonial infidels Before the wind of death takes you Turning to ashes to be eaten by worms So rear the path for future generations

— Ahmed Gabyow

=== Filonardi expeditions ===
The Italian government tasked its consul at Zanzibar, captain Filonardi, to create colonial outposts on the Banaadir coast. The port of Adale was occupied in February 1891 and the location was renamed Itala. This began Italy's territorial occupation in Somalia. The governments of Rome and London agreed on the borders of their respective zones of influence with various protocols (such agreements continued to be made in the following years, with an Anglo-Italian border protocol signed on 5 May 1894, followed by an agreement in 1906 between Cavalier Pestalozza and General Swaine acknowledging that Buraan fell under the Majeerteen Sultanate's administration).

In October and November 1893, Filonardi and the Italian navy occupied Mogadishu, Merca, Barawa and Warsheekh. The first recorded act of Somali resistance occurred on October 2, 1893, in Merca. During the visit a captain of one of the Italian vessels, Lieutenant Maurizio Talmone, was assassinated by Somalis. As a retaliation, Italian ships bombarded the coasts of Nimmo and Jasira. Furthermore, the commander of the Staffetta deposed the local chief and captured leaders of the town. In the territories it administered, the Filonardi company was given the difficult task of increasing trade and customs revenues, fighting slavery, and controlling the local walis (governors) and tribes. Another expedition by Filonardi occupied Giumbo on May 1, 1895.

=== Battle of Lafoole ===
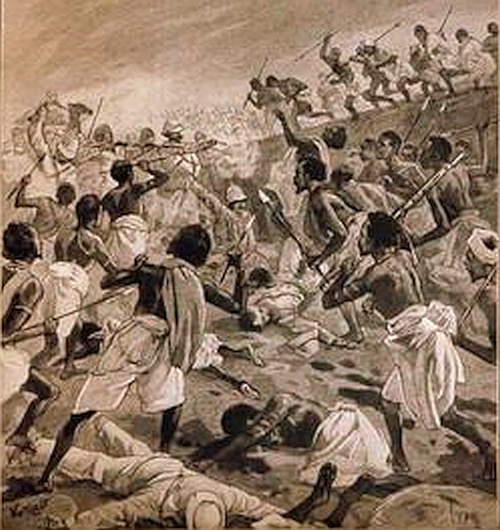
Battle scene during the Italo-Somali War of 1896

The Banaadir resistance and their sieges across Somali cities, with the growing anti Italian Sentiment and the Italian authority's retribution, continued unabated for many years. It was heightened when, in November 1896, while on a pleasure trip, Consul Antonio Cecchi, the Societá del Benadir administrator and also the de facto governor of Southern Somaliland, and his lieutenants, were ambushed at Lafoole, a small village a few kilometres from Afgooye, south of Muqdisho, by Wa'daan and Bimaal fighters, who massacred 14 of the Italians, including Cecchi.

With the attack at Lafoole resulting in the deaths of 14 Italian officials and soldiers, it had managed to garnish strong reactions in Rome, as the embarrassing incident was dubbed “The Somali Adwa” by Italians.

=== Sorrentino expedition ===
The Italian government sent captain Giorgio Sorrentino to Mogadishu, giving him the task to conduct a punitive expedition to avenge Lafoole. On February 1, 1897, a garrison led by Sorrentino, protected by artillery and troops desembarked from the Italian ships Elba and Governolo (which had previously bombarded Nimmo), set out to recover the unburied skeletons of the Italians killed at Lafoole. Sorrentino organized a funeral ceremony, with military honors, to bury the fallen in a chapel near the shore. A monument was dedicated to the massacre. Immediately after the ceremony, a group of men went to the coastal dune, about fifty meters high, to choose the site where a fort would later be built. The stronghold was armed with four 75 mm guns and, it was named Fort Cecchi after one of the fallen.

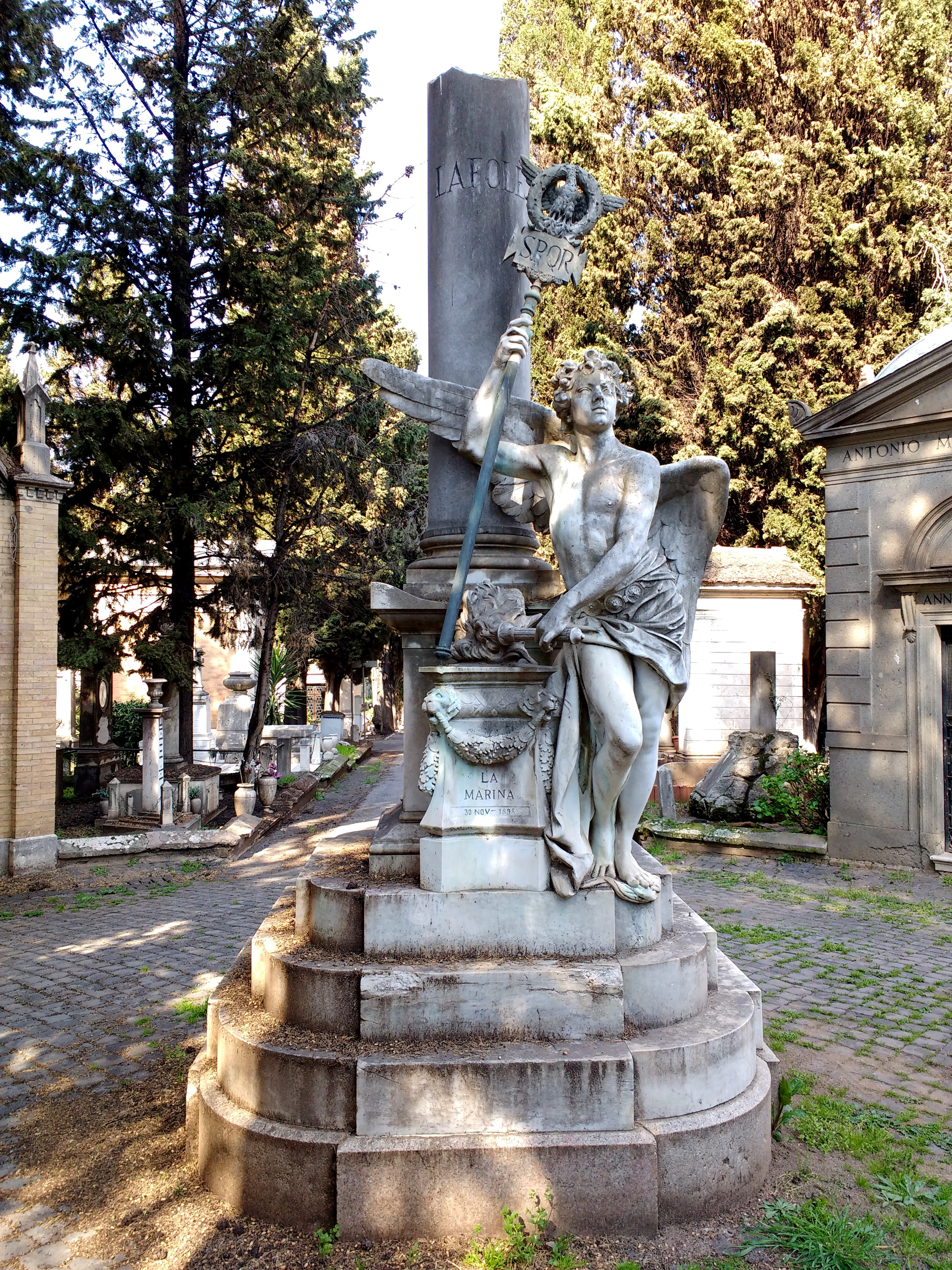
Italian memorial for the soldiers massacred by Somali troops at Lafoole

After the bodies were recovered, the village of Nimmo was set on fire and 70 Somalis were captured in the village of Gesira. With the reinforcement of 150 Eritrean askaris, who arrived on 12 April 1897 with the ship Volta, Sorrentino destroyed the towns of Gellai, Res, and of Lafoole. Somalis attacked the Italian column, in a battle that lasted several hours, but were defeated. In the engagement, 50 Somalis were killed. On the Italian side, 1 Askari died.

In Robert L. Hess own words;

“The impression made by the punitive expedition after Lafoole could hardly have been called lasting.” Since after this expedition, the Italians primarily retreated to the coast until further campaigns.

== The Bimaal resistance ==
Anti colonial campaigns led by the Bimaal, Wacdaan, Abgaal, and other southern Somali clans against Italian forces in southern Somalia from the late 1890s to the early 1920s. It officially began after the Battle of Lafoole in which two Italian were ambushed and killed, then the killing of Italian official Antonio Cecchi at Lafoole in 1896, which triggered reprisals and a wider revolt centered around Merca and the Shabelle valley. The rebellion led primarily by the powerful pro-slavery clan of the Bimaal following the contrast made by the Colonial Benadir Company against the slave trade, led to the total failure of the "pacification" policy designed in Rome.

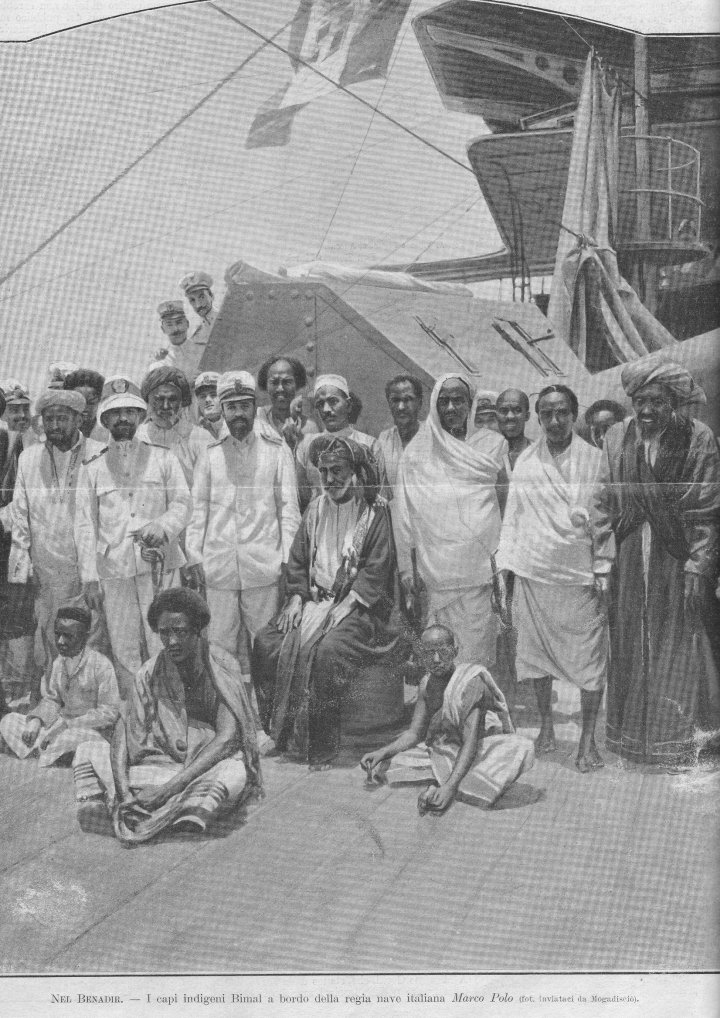
Bimal elders and Sultan discussing matters with Italian figures on board the Italian cruiser Marco Polo. Published on L'Illustrazione Italiana in May 1907

Bimaal leaders in the Banaadir region included Sheikh Abdi Abikar Gafle, Ma’alin Mursal, Abdi Yusuf, Haji ibrahim Gaashan, Malaakh Cabdi Juray, and Bilow Ageede. In the late 1890s and early 1900s, the Bimal opposed Italian colonialism in Somalia. Italian garrisons in both Marka and Jazira were under siege and barely survived. Though Italy sent support troops, they suffered considerable losses. In February 1907, at Turunley, also known as Dhanane, north of Marka, some 2,000 Banadiri warriors, led by Sheikh Abdi Abiikar Gaafle, a religious Bimaal leader and imam fought 1,000 Italian troops, assisted by some 1,500 Arab, Eritrean, and Somali mercenaries led by Lieutenant Gustavo Pesenti. The attack started after midnight, February 9, 1907, and lasted to the noon of the 10th. The Somali warriors retreated, leaving behind several hundred dead and as many wounded. Although the Italians had high casualties, they considered Turunley a major military victory, one which Lieutenant Pesenti, the commander of the regiment, celebrated in an eyewitness account, Danane (Dhanane). In July 1908, at Finlow, the Bimal avenged Turunley defeating some 500 Italian troops. However, the subsequent 1908 expeditions led by Antonino Di Giorgio and Vincenzo Rossi led to the capitulation of major centres such as Afgooye and surrounding Somali cities. Eventually, Italians ceased the hostilities by the Bimaal and other clans by winning a string of conflicts, such as in Bula-Iach (19 June), Gilib (26 August) and Mellet (14 October). Although instability would still persist in the southern regions of Somalia. During this period, the Sultan of the Geledi, Osman Ahmed, agreed to turn his realm into an Italian protectorate, which many young members of the Geledi clan opposed.

=== Dervish letter ===
In his letter or risala lil-bimal Muhammed Abdullah Hassasn, supreme leader of the Somali Dervish movement praised the Bimal and tried to persuade the Bimal to join his anti-colonial wars. His letter to the Bimal was documented as the most extended exposition of his mind as a Muslim thinker and religious figure. The letter to this day is still preserved. It is said that the Bimal, thanks to their numerically powerful size, traditionally and religiously devoted fierce warriors and possession of much resources, intrigued Mahamed Abdulle Hassan. But not only that, the Bimal themselves had mounted an extensive and major resistance against the Italians, especially in the first decade of the 19th century. The Italians carried many expeditions against the powerful Bimal to try and pacify them. Because of this, the Bimal had all the reason to join the Dervish struggle. So, to win their support over, the Sayyid wrote a detailed theological statement to present to the Bimal tribe, who dominated the strategic Banaadir port of Merca and its surroundings regions and cities.

== Perception ==
One of the Italian's greatest fears was the spread of 'Dervishism' (which had come to mean revolt) in the south and the strong Bimaal tribe of Banaadir whom already were at war with the Italians, while not following the religious message or adhering to the views of Muhammad Abdullah Hassan, understood greatly his goal and political tactics. The dervishes, in this case, were engaged in supplying arms to the Bimaal.

The Italians wanted to bring in an end to the Bimaal revolt and at all cost prevent a Bimal-Dervish alliance, which lead them to use the forces of Obbia as prevention.

Italian garrisons in Marka barely survived the harassments and skirmishes and reinforcements from Mogadishu suffered considerable loses. This noble resistance caught the attention of Mohamed Abdulle Hassan, the charismatic Darawiish leader — who sent a lengthy message to the Bimal (Risaalat lil-Bimaal) in which he commended their efforts and proclaimed the necessity of waging Jihad against the colonial invaders. He attached a supplemental text entitled “Qam’ al-Mu’anidin” (Suppression of the Rebellious) that clarified the tenets of Saalihiya order, for which the leader ascribed to.

== See also ==
- Italian Somaliland
- Italian Somali wars

== Bibliography ==
- Carpanelli, Elena; Scovazzi, Tullio (2020). Political and legal aspects of Italian colonialism in Somalia. G. Giappichelli editore. ISBN 978-88-921-8346-9. OCLC 1150848404.
- Scala, Edoardo (1956). History of Italian infantries, volume IV, Somalia. Rome: Biblioteca Storica.
