= Italian Somaliland =

Italian territory in Africa (1889–1941)

Coordinates: 2°N 45°E

Italian Somaliland Somalia Italiana (Italian) maxmiyada Soomaalida Talyaaniga (Somali) الصومال الإيطالي (Arabic) Al-Sumal Al-Italiy
- 1889–1941 (Note: Hobyo and Majerteen: protectorates (1889–1925); colony (1925–1941) Banaadir: chartered company (1890s–1905); colony (1905–1941) Geledi: protectorate (1902–1910); colony (1910–1941))
- Flag Coat of arms
- Motto: Per l'onore d'Italia "For the honour of Italy"
- Anthem: Marcia Reale d'Ordinanza "Royal March of Ordinance" Marcia Reale
- Italian Somaliland, with Oltre Giuba acquired in 1925
- Status: Colony of Italy
- Capital: Mogadiscio
- Common languages: Italian (official); Somali, Arabic
- Religion: Islam, Roman Catholicism
- Demonym: Somali
- King
  - 1889–1900: Umberto I
  - 1900–1936: Victor Emmanuel III
- Governor
  - 1889–1893 (first): Vincenzo Filonardi
  - 1936 (last): Angelo De Ruben
- Historical era: New Imperialism
  - Hiraab Protectorate: 7 January 1889
  - Hobyo Protectorate: 9 February 1889
  - Majeerteen Protectorate: 7 April 1889
  - Geledi Protectorate: 1902
  - Official establishment of the Banaadir colony: 19 March 1905
  - Italian Somali Wars, Campaign of the Sultanates: 1890~1927
  - Part of Italian East Africa: 1 June 1936
  - British occupation: 26 February 1941
  - Relinquished by Italy: 10 February 1947
  - End of British occupation: 1 April 1950
  - Somali unification: 1 July 1960
- Currency: Italian lira (1889–1909); Somali rupia (1909–1925); Somali lira (1925–1938)
Preceded by
Sultanate of Hobyo
Majeerteen Sultanate
Hiraab Imamate
Geledi Sultanate
Italian Trans-Juba
Succeeded by
Italian East Africa
- Today part of: Somalia

Italian Somaliland (Italian: Somalia Italiana; Arabic: الصومال الإيطالي, romanized: Al-Sumal Al-Italiy; Somali: Dhulka Soomaalida ee Talyaaniga) comprised self-ruling protectorates and colonial possessions of the Kingdom of Italy in present-day Somalia. It lasted from the late 19th century to 1941, when it was occupied by British troops; from 1950 to 1960 it was revived as the UN Trust Territory of Somalia under Italian administration.

Following two treaties in 1889, Italy established a protectorate over northern Somali territories ruled by the Sultanate of Hobyo and the Majeerteen Sultanate. In the south, the Italians established colonial rule over Adale in 1892, Mogadishu, Merca, Barawa and Warsheekh in 1893, Giumbo and Luuq in 1895, Jazeera in 1897, Afgooye, Maregh, Barire, Mellèt, Danane and Balàd in 1907–1908, and the territories between the Shebelle and Jubba rivers in the following years. During this period, the Bimaal and Wa'dan revolts near Merca marked the Somali resistance to Italian expansion, coinciding with the rise of the anti-colonial Dervish movement led by Mohammed Abdullah Hassan'.

Effective Italian control remained initially limited to the coastal areas and Benadir territory until after the collapse of the Dervish movement. As a reward for the Italian participation in World War I on the Entente side, the UK ceded the territory of Oltre Giuba (Trans-Juba) to Italy in 1925. By the end of 1927, the territories of Hobyo Sultanate and Majeerteen Sultanate, in the northern regions of Somalia, were annexed after the two year long, Campaign of the Sultanates. Through its history, various infrastructure projects were set up, most notably railways, dams, farms and villages, and 50.000 Italians settled in the colony.

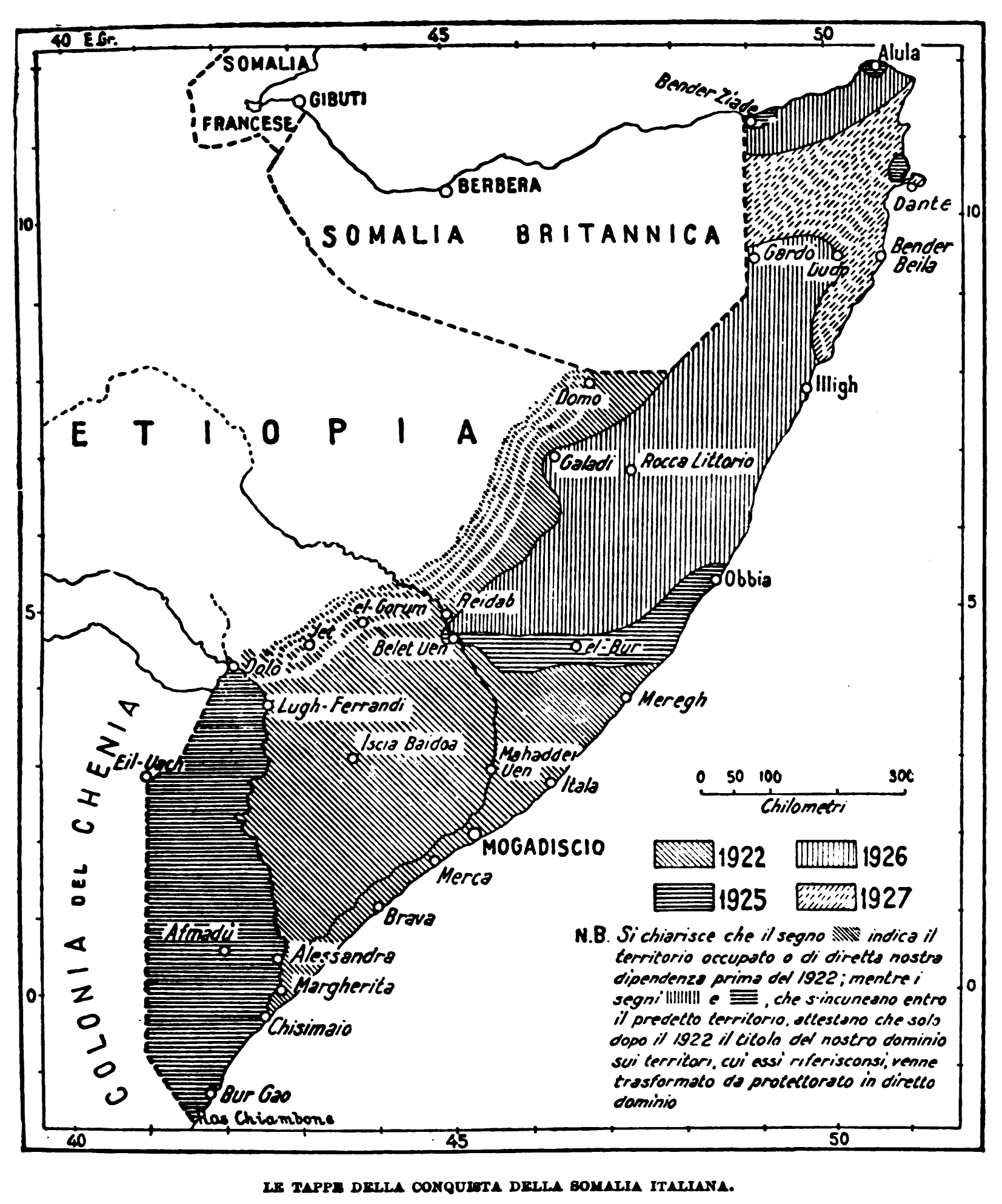
Stages of conquest in Italian Somaliland

In 1936, the region was integrated into Italian East Africa as the Somalia Governorate. This would last until Italy's loss of the region in 1941, during the East African campaign of World War II. Italian Somaliland then came under British military administration until 1950, when it became a United Nations trusteeship, the Trust Territory of Somalia under Italian administration. On 1 July 1960, the Trust Territory of Somalia united with the former British Somaliland to form the Somali Republic.

== History ==
=== Background and early contacts (1876–1880) ===
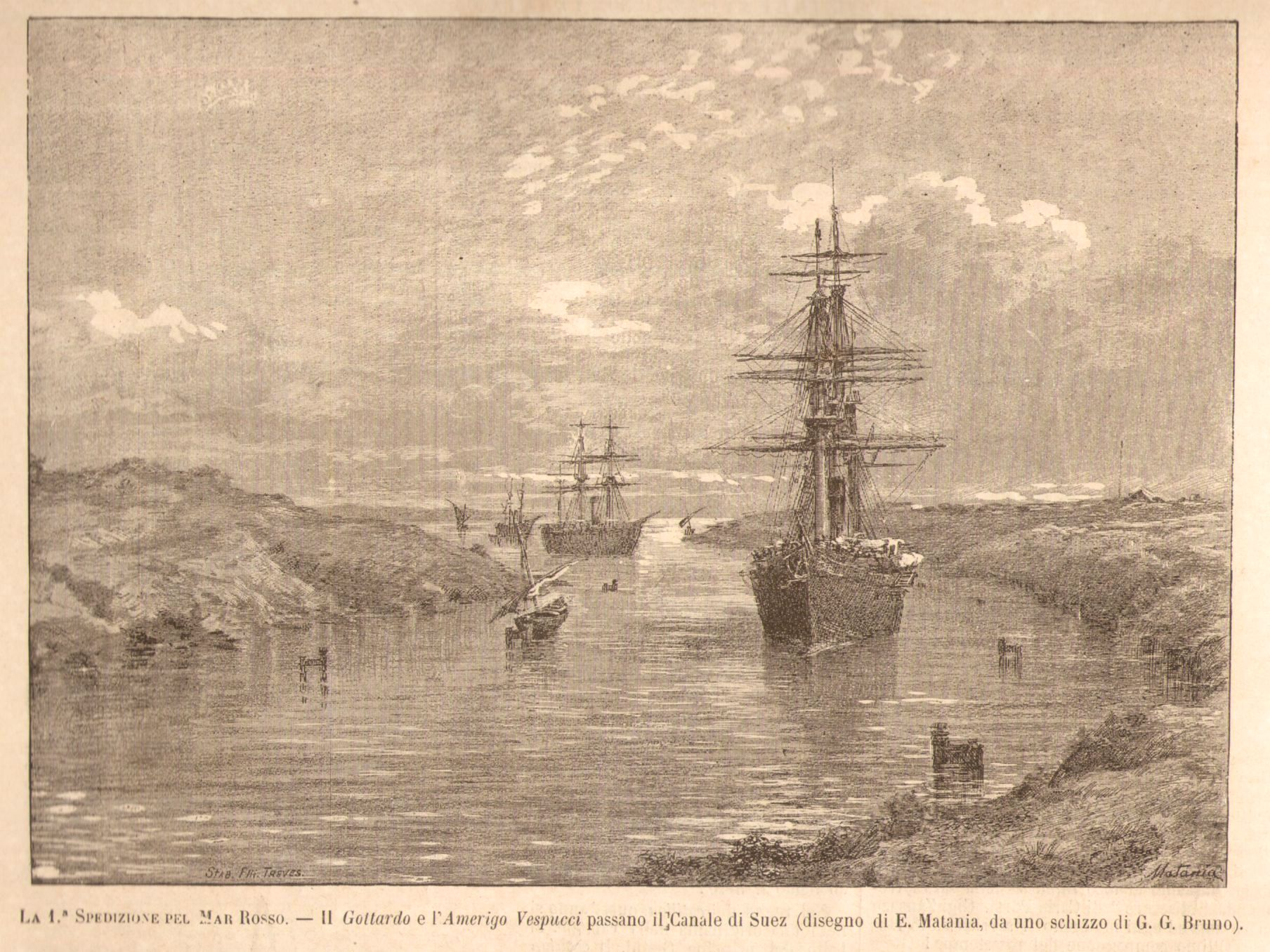
Italian ships Gottardo and Vespucci sailing in the Suez Canal during the Italian expedition to the Red Sea in 1885

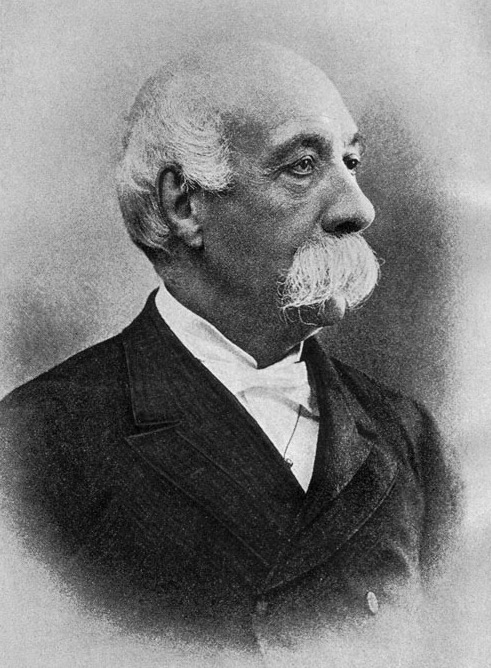
Francesco Crispi promoted Italian colonialism in Africa in the late 1800s.

Cesare Correnti organized an expedition under the Società Geografica Italiana in 1876. The next year, the travel journal L’Esploratore was established by Manfredo Camperio. The "Società di Esplorazioni Commerciali in Africa" was created in 1879, with the Italian industrial establishment involved as well. The "Club Africano", which three years later became the "Società Africana D’Italia", was also established in Somalia in 1880.

=== Treaties of protection and trade (1888–1891) ===
In late 1888, Sultan Yusuf Ali Kenadid sent a treaty request to Italy to make the Sultanate of Hobyo an Italian protectorate. The treaty was signed on February 8, 1889. His rival Boqor Osman Mahamuud signed a similar agreement vis-a-vis his own Majeerteen Sultanate (Majeerteenia) on April 7, 1889. Both rulers had entered into the protectorate treaties to advance their own expansionist goals, with Sultan Kenadid looking to use Italy's support in his ongoing power struggle with Boqor Osman over the Majeerteen Sultanate, as well as in a separate conflict with the Hiraab Imamate, who was already facing serious decline, over an area to the south of Hobyo. In signing the agreements, the rulers also hoped to exploit the rival objectives of the European imperial powers to help ensure the continued independence of their territories.

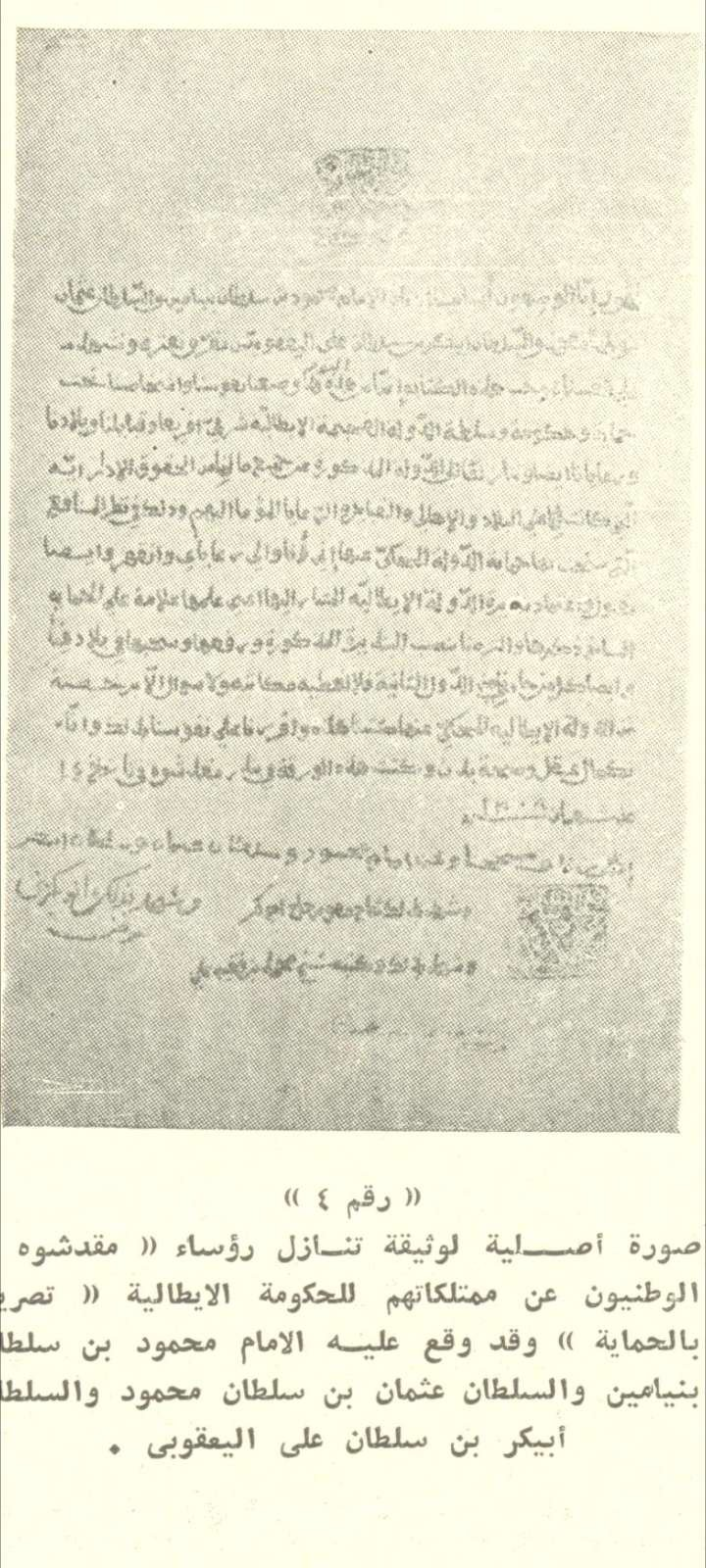
Agreement between the rulers of the Hiraab Yacquubi dynasty accepting to become a protectorate of the Kingdom of Italy in 1891

The Italians, for their part, were interested in the largely arid territory mainly because of its ports, which could grant them access to the strategically important Suez Canal and the Gulf of Aden.

The terms of each treaty specified that Italy was to steer clear of any interference in the sultanates' respective administrations. In return for Italian arms and an annual subsidy, the sultans conceded to a minimum of oversight and economic concessions. The Italians also agreed to dispatch a few ambassadors to promote both the sultanates' and their own interests.

Italian ships regularly conducted reconnaissance missions off the coast of Somalia and visited many localities, not only in the territories under Italy's protection but also those nominally claimed by Italy's trade partner, Zanzibar.

=== Early Italian Expeditions and Somali engagements (1890–1896) ===
On April 24, 1890, the Italian frigate Volta visited Warsheikh. Sub-lieutenant Carlo Zavagli went onshore, intending to invite the local leaders to collect some gifts aboard. He was attacked, wounded, and died on the boat, which was hastily trying to get out to sea while the rest of the crew fired wildly to cover their escape. A sailor named Bertorello was hit by the Somalis while working on the anchor, suffering mortal wounds.

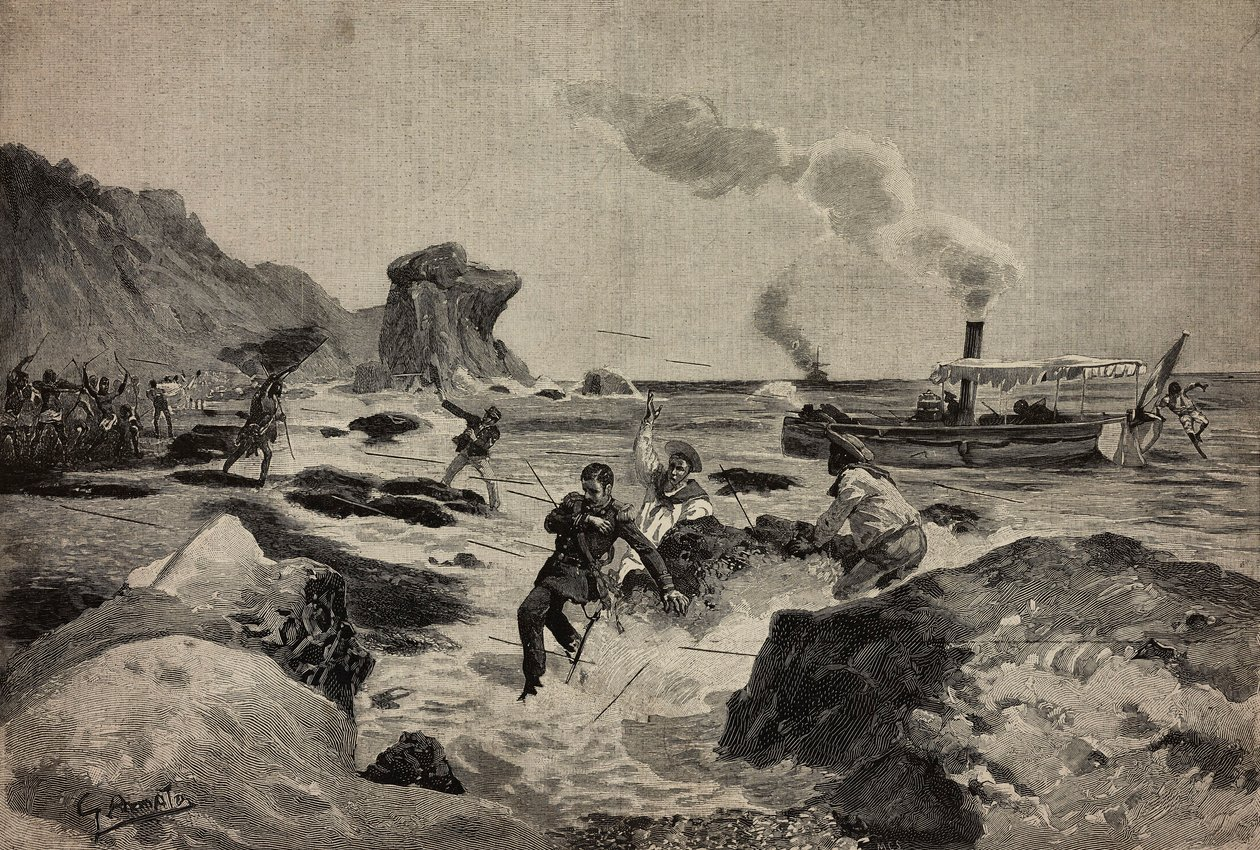
Somali attack on Italian ships at Warsheikh

Sheekh Ahmed Gabyow, also known as Sheekh Gabyow, recited this poem at the end of June 1891 after the battles of Cadale and Warsheikh. The killing of Zavagli along with 60 Italian colonial troops was said to have been the first call for Somali nationalism.

We are fighting for the Somalis We fight those who commit evil Oh ye reject colonial infidels Before the wind of death takes you Turning to ashes to be eaten by worms So rear the path for future generations

— Ahmed Gabyow

==== Creation of Italian outposts on the Banaadir coast ====
The Italian government tasked its consul at Zanzibar, captain Filonardi, to create colonial outposts on the Banaadir coast. The port of Adale was occupied in February 1891 and the location was renamed Itala. This began Italy's territorial occupation in Somalia. The governments of Rome and London agreed on the borders of their respective zones of influence with various protocols (such agreements continued to be made in the following years, with an Anglo-Italian border protocol signed on 5 May 1894, followed by an agreement in 1906 between Cavalier Pestalozza and General Swaine acknowledging that Buraan fell under the Majeerteen Sultanate's administration).

In October and November 1893, Filonardi and the Italian navy occupied Merca, Mogadishu, Barawa and Warsheekh. The first recorded act of Somali resistance occurred on October 2, 1893, in Merca. During the visit a captain of one of the Italian vessels, Lieutenant Maurizio Talmone, was assassinated by Somalis. As a retaliation, Italian ships bombarded the coasts of Nimmo and Jasira, before withdrawing to their limited areas of influence on the coast for numerous years. Furthermore, the commander of the Staffetta deposed the local chief and captured leaders of the town. In the territories it administered, the Filonardi company was given the difficult task of increasing trade and customs revenues, fighting slavery, and controlling the local walis (governors) and tribes. Another expedition by Filonardi occupied Giumbo on May 1, 1895.

As the sub-concession to Filonardi expired, a new contract entrusted the management of the ports for 48 years to the "Italian Benadir Commercial Company", following a transitional period under a provisional administration led by Consul Cecchi. However, in November 1896, while on a pleasure trip, Consul Antonio Cecchi [it], the Societá del Benadir administrator and also the de facto governor of Southern Somaliland, and his lieutenants, were ambushed at Lafoole, a small village a few kilometres from Afgooye, south of Muqdisho, by Biimaal and Wa'daan fighters, who massacred 14 of the Italians, including Cecchi.The Biimaal and Wa'daan launched a joint expeditionary force against Italians during that period. This was dubbed “The Somali Adwa” for its disastrous aftermath.

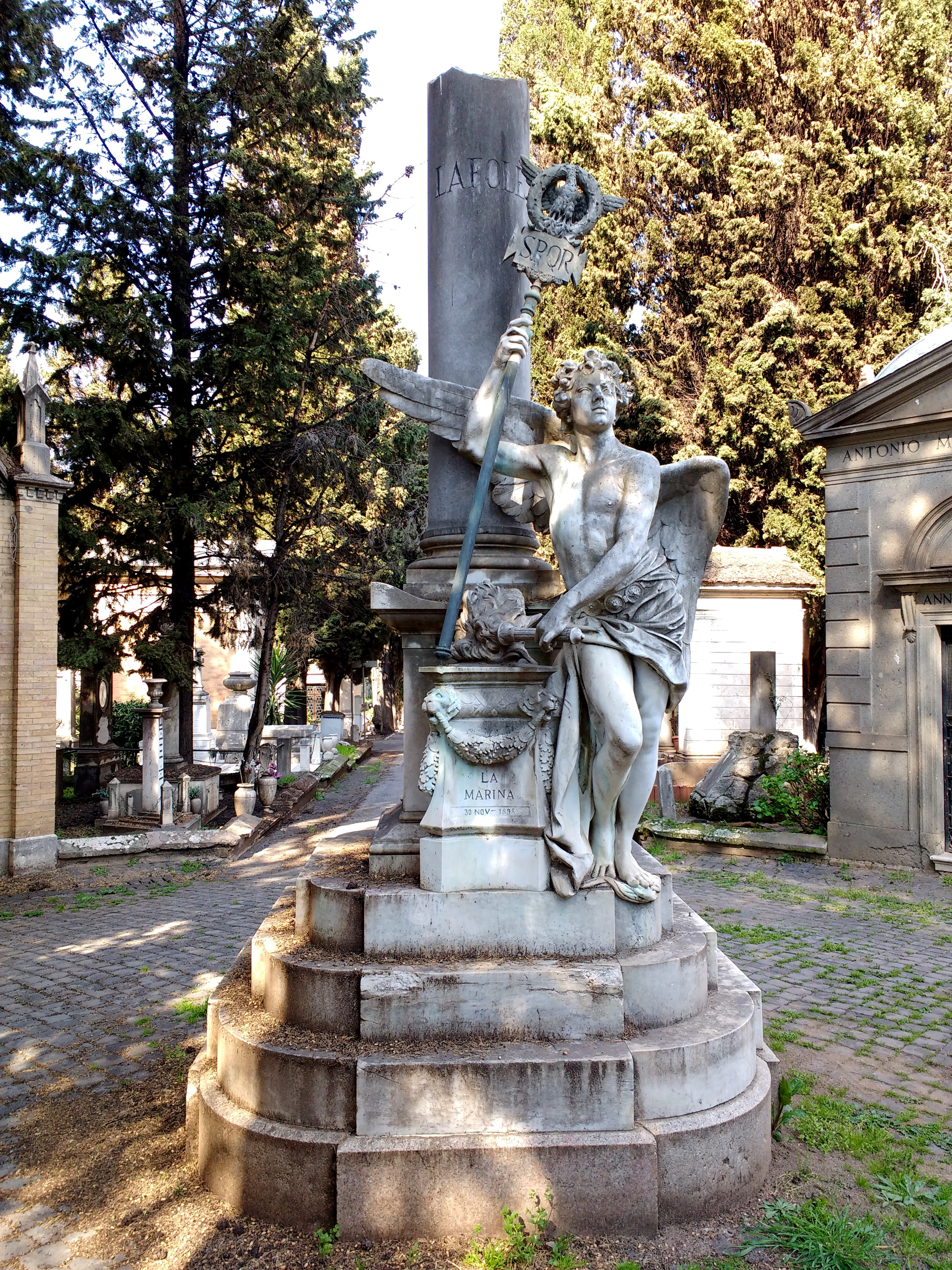
Italian memorial for the soldiers killed by Somali troops at Lafoole

==== Sorrentino expedition ====
The Italian government sent captain Giorgio Sorrentino to Mogadishu, giving him the task to conduct a punitive expedition to avenge Lafoole. On February 1, 1897, a garrison led by Sorrentino, protected by artillery and troops desembarked from the Italian ships Elba and Governolo (which had previously bombarded Nimmo), set out to recover the unburied skeletons of the Italians killed at Lafoole. Sorrentino organized a funeral ceremony, with military honors, to bury the fallen in a chapel near the shore. A monument was dedicated to the massacre. Immediately after the ceremony, a group of men went to the coastal dune, about fifty meters high, to choose the site where a fort would later be built. The stronghold was armed with four 75 mm guns and, it was named Fort Cecchi after one of the fallen.

After the bodies were recovered, the village of Nimmo was set on fire and 70 Somalis were captured in the village of Gesira. With the reinforcement of 150 Eritrean askaris, who arrived on 12 April 1897 with the ship Volta, Sorrentino destroyed the towns of Gellai, Res, and of Lafoole. Somalis attacked the Italian column, in a battle that lasted several hours, but were defeated. In the engagement, 50 Somalis were killed. On the Italian side, 1 Askari died.

In Robert L. Hess own words;

“The impression made by the punitive expedition after Lafoole could hardly have been called lasting.” Since after this expedition, the Italians primarily retreated to the coast until further campaigns. During the campaign, Italian troops razed all villages east of the Shebelle River while seizing livestock and killing Somali residents in the area.

=== Italian-Somali wars ===
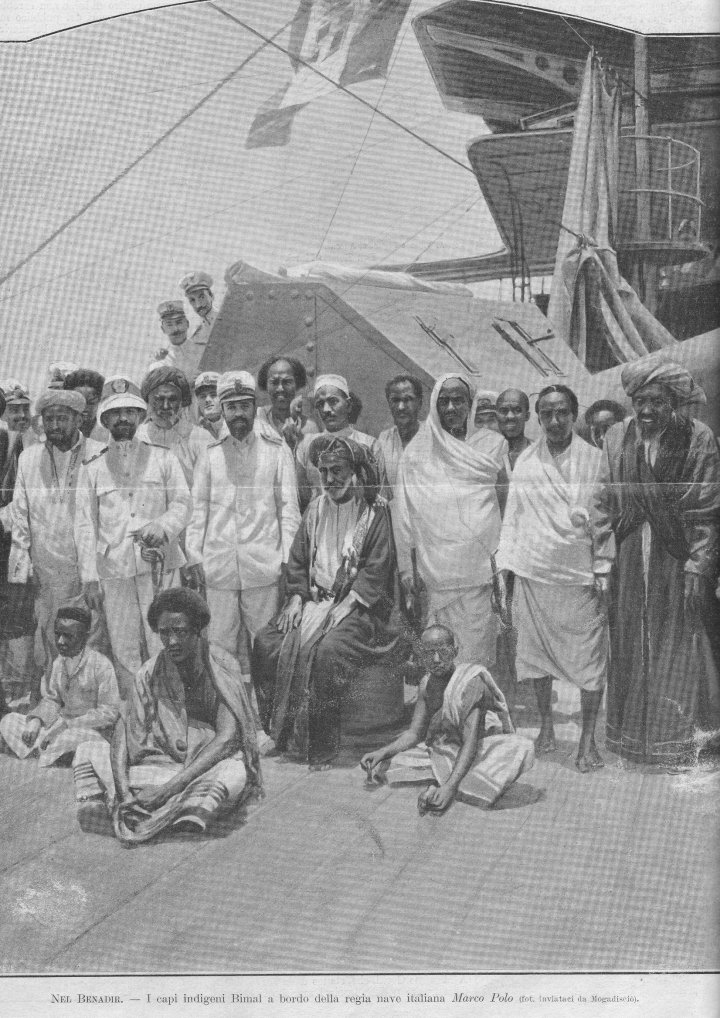
Bimal elders and Sultan discussing matters with Italian figures on board the Italian cruiser Marco Polo, published on L'Illustrazione Italiana in May 1907

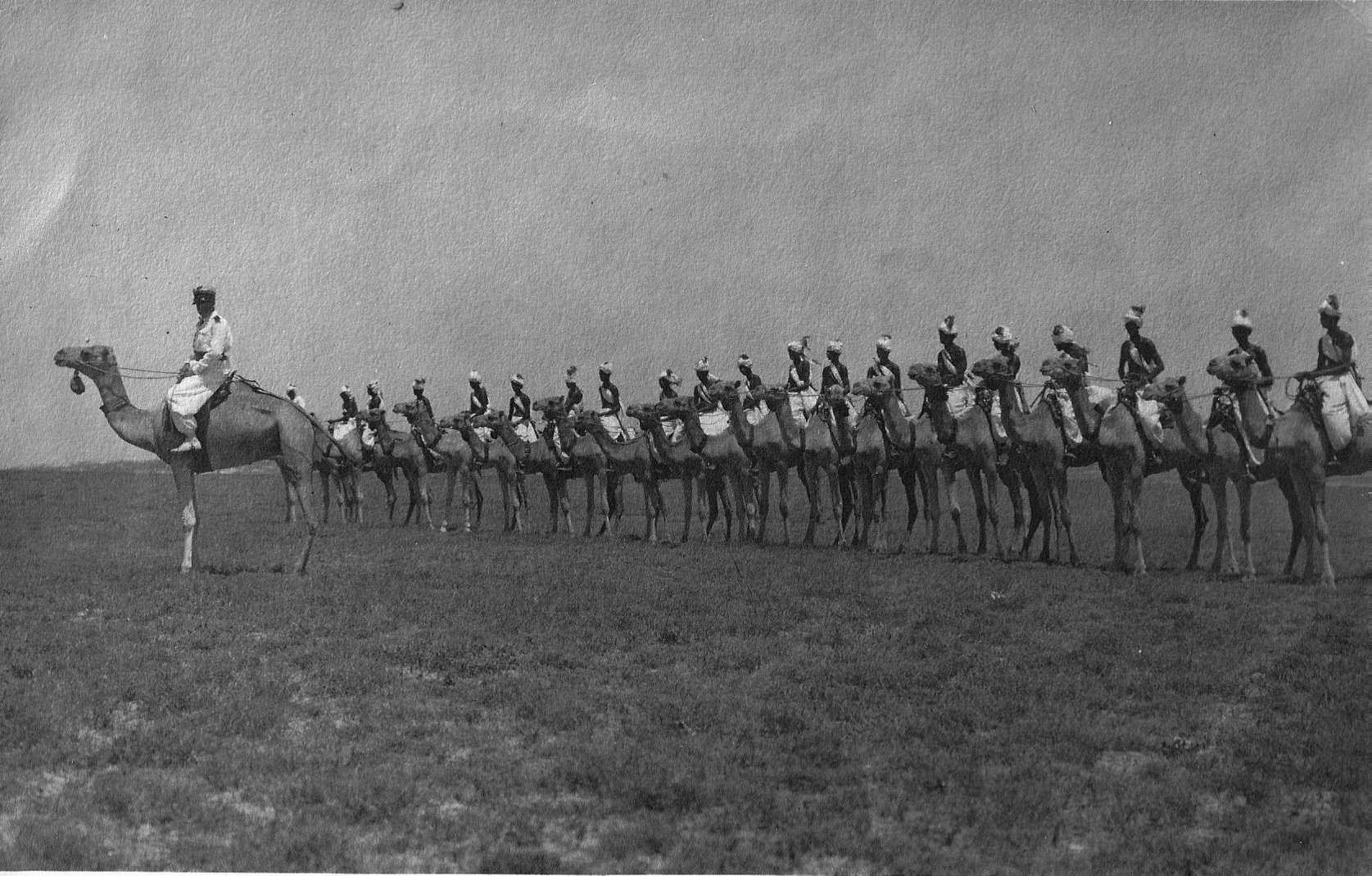
Somali Dubat camel colonial troops under Italian Colonel Camillo Bechi's command

==== The Banadir resistance ====
During 1896 and 1897, the Somalis had shown signs of revolt with the annihilation of the Cecchi expedition (November 27, 1896) and the assassination of Italian resident Giacomo Trevis. The rebellion led primarily by the powerful pro-slavery clan of the Bimaal following the contrast made by the Colonial Benadir Company against the slave trade, led to the total failure of the "pacification" policy designed in Rome.

In the 1890s, Italian-occupied Marka was the centre of the Bimal culture. This sparked the beginning of conflict and a chain of attacks against the Italians by the Bimaal, Wa’daan, Geledi, and various other Somali clans. under the leadership of Sheikh Abdi Gafle and Ma’alin Mursal Abdi Yusuf, two prominent local Islamic teachers in Marka from the Bimal clan. These clans harboring a strong anti-colonist sentiment would represent the core of the initial Somali resistance against Italian colonialism.

In 1905, Italian successes at Bula-Iach (19 June), Gilib (26 August) and Mellet (14 October) forced a part of the Bimals to submit, but others continued to resist. In February 1907, a large meeting of Bimaal warriors was held in Moialo, near Merca. Italian forces, led by lieutenant Streva, marched against them and set Moialo ablaze. An Italian column, forming a square, was attacked by approximately 2,500 Bimaals. The resulting battle of Danane (10 February 1907) ended with an Italian victory. Italian officer Presenti was wounded in action. More than 100 Bimaals were killed and even more were wounded. Shekh Abdi Abiker retreated beyond the Shebelle River into the territory of the Intera, where he later sent 100 men and 40 camels to the Mullah to obtain more weapons.

Hostilities resumed in 1908. Italians under Captain Vitali won the battles of Dongab (2 March), Gilib (400 Bimaal casualties) and Mellet (7 march), while Italian ships bombarded various localities, but hundreds of Bimaals blockaded Merca again. The block came to an end with the expedition led by major Di Giorgio, who defeated a Dervish-Bimal coalition in two battles at Mellet (11-12 July, over 1000 casualties) and the Wa'daan at Merere (30 August), where rebel ships were sunk. Thus, Afgoy was occupied by the Italians (3 September). Shortly after, however, Bimaals destroyed the villages of Res and Curare, threatening Afgoy. The troops of Di Giorgio crossed the river and, forming a square, defeated a Bimaal assault in a forest at Hararei (25 September; 80 Bimals and 4 Askaris died in the battle). The rebel centre of Balàd was destroyed. The area was pacified with a final campaign by major Rossi, who, once again leading a square formation, defeated 1,000 Dervishes in the battles of Bulàlo (22 November) and Sengagle (27 November). As a result of these campaigns, Italian Somaliland was expanded to include Afgoy, Maregh, Barire, Mellèt, Danane and Balàd. For the first time, the entirety of the Lower Shabelle region was under Italian control.

==== Dervish wars ====
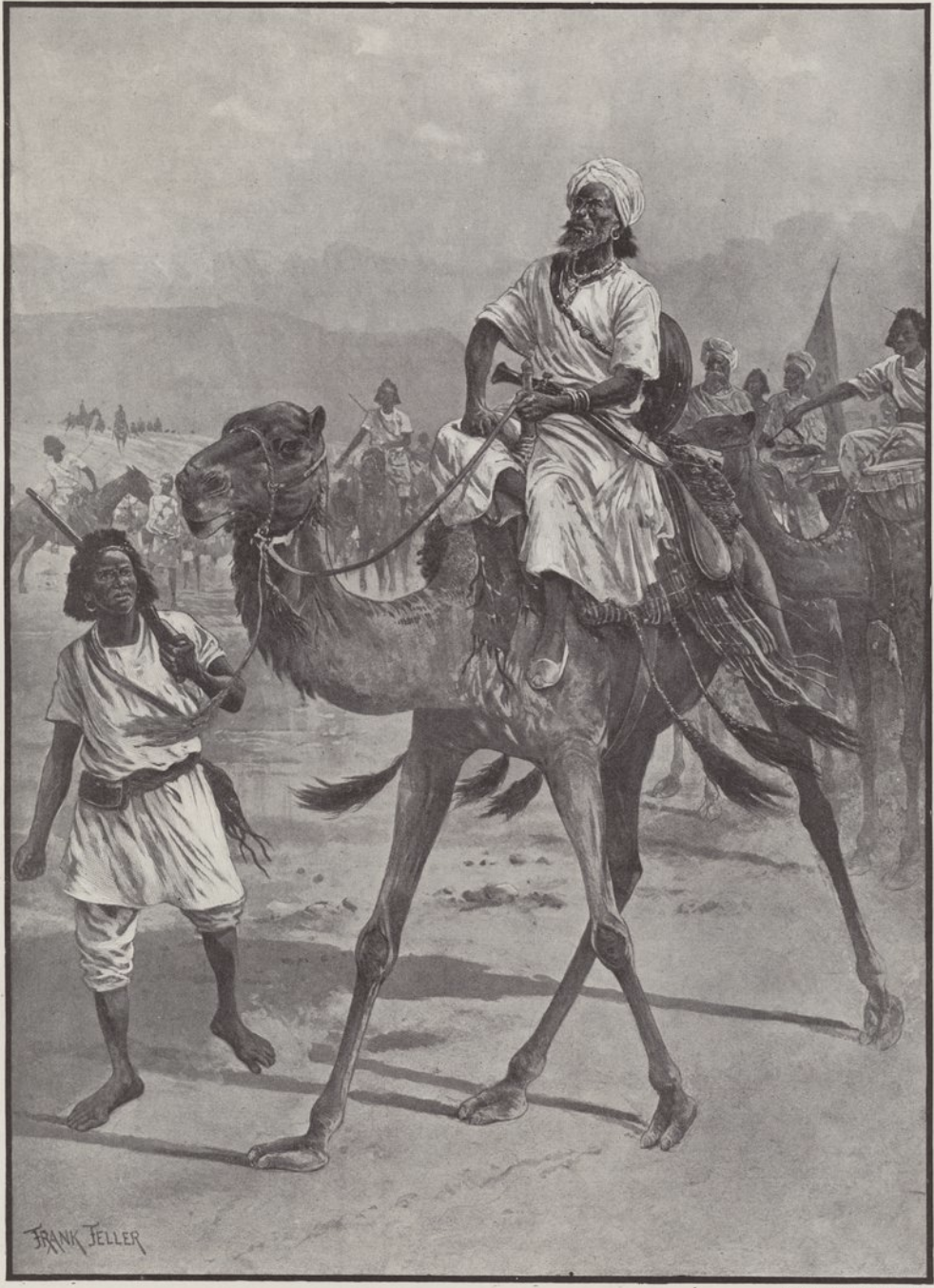
Sayid Mohammed Abdullah Hassan, leader of the Dervish riding a camel alongside his followers

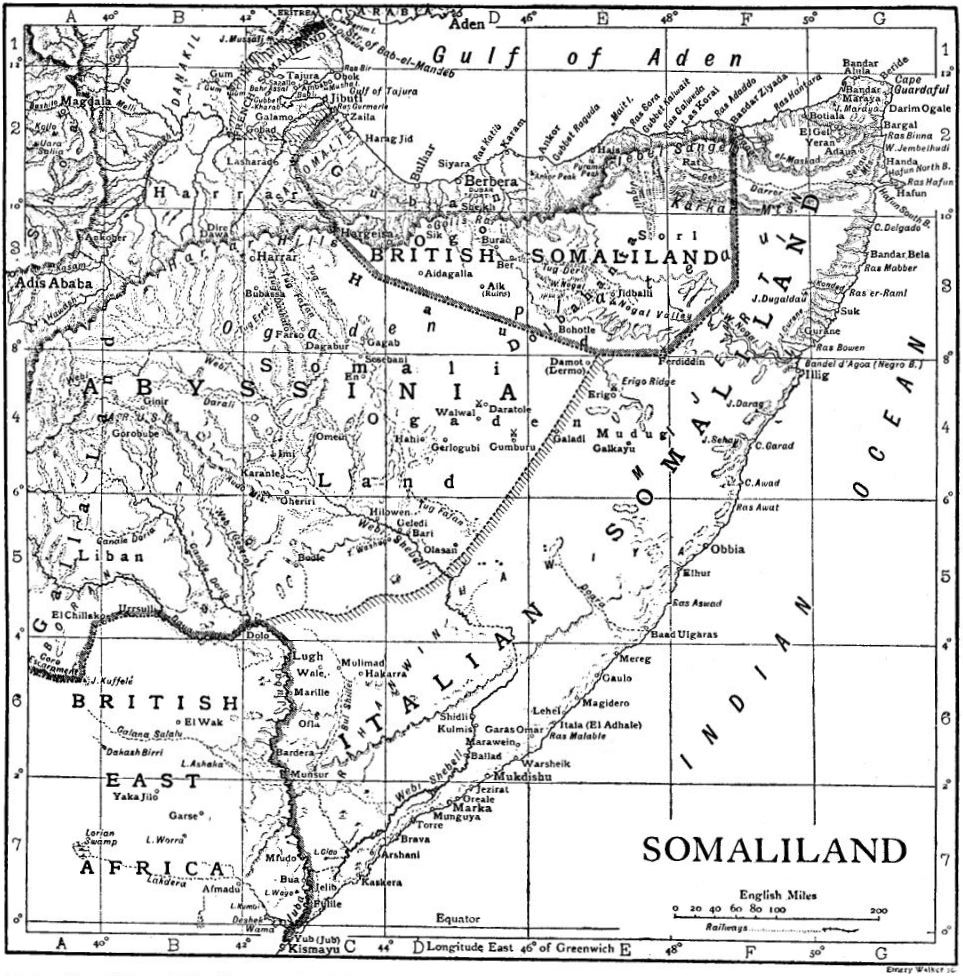
1911 map of Somalia showing Italian Somaliland and British Somaliland.

In 1912 the Dervishes received intelligence that the Italians were gradually expanding in South Somalia and were closing in on Hiraan, an area free of colonial presence. The Italians' most forward positions were in Mahaday, just above Jowhar.

On 3 March 1913, the Dervish movement clashed with the Italian colonial army around Beledweyne in the Hiraan region of Italian Somaliland, at the Battle of Hiraan. A Dervish force of approximately 900 men, led by Mohamed Abdullah Hassan and commanders including Isman Boos and Ismail Mire, successfully resisted the Italian offensive. The Italians ultimately abandoned their advance, retreating from the area. This retreat effectively ceded control of the Hiraan region in southern Somalia to the Dervishes, which later fortified its position by building new forts: Aammiin and Laba Mataanood. The Hiraan region was finally put under the Dervish banner in 1913.

1915 map of the situation in the Dervish war

During World War I, the Dervishes, with minimal support from the Ottoman Empire, conducted raids into Italian-controlled territories, but were stopped by the garrisons of Bulo Burti and Tiyeglow. On the 27th of March 1916, due to the betrayal of Somali irregulars hired into the service of the Italians, the Dervishes sacked the fort of Bulo Burti. Italian officer Battistella was killed in this attack. After the recapture of Bulo Burti, an Italian column under captain Silvestri defeated and dispersed the Dervishes in the battle of Beledweyne, on the 16th of January 1917, which was the main base of operations against Italian Somaliland. The Italian column had light casualties, 6 dead and 4 wounded, while the Dervishes suffered 50 dead and numerous wounded.

Britain agreed to cede the Jubaland region to Italian Somaliland. The transfer occurred in 1925. The British retained control of the southern half of the partitioned Jubaland territory, which was later called the Northern Frontier District (NFD).

==== Campaign of the sultanates ====
The relationship between the Sultanate of Hobyo and Italy soured when Sultan Kenadid refused the Italians' proposal to allow a British contingent of troops to disembark in his sultanate so that they might then pursue their battle against the Somali religious and nationalist leader Muhammad Abdullah Hassan's Dervish forces. Viewed as too much of a threat, Sultan Kenadid was eventually exiled to Aden in Yemen and then to Eritrea. His son Ali Yusuf Kenadid succeeded him on the throne. In 1924, Governor Cesare Maria De Vecchi adopted a policy of disarmentation of the northern Somali sultanates. Sultan Ali Yusuf Kenadid was thereafter in turn exiled.

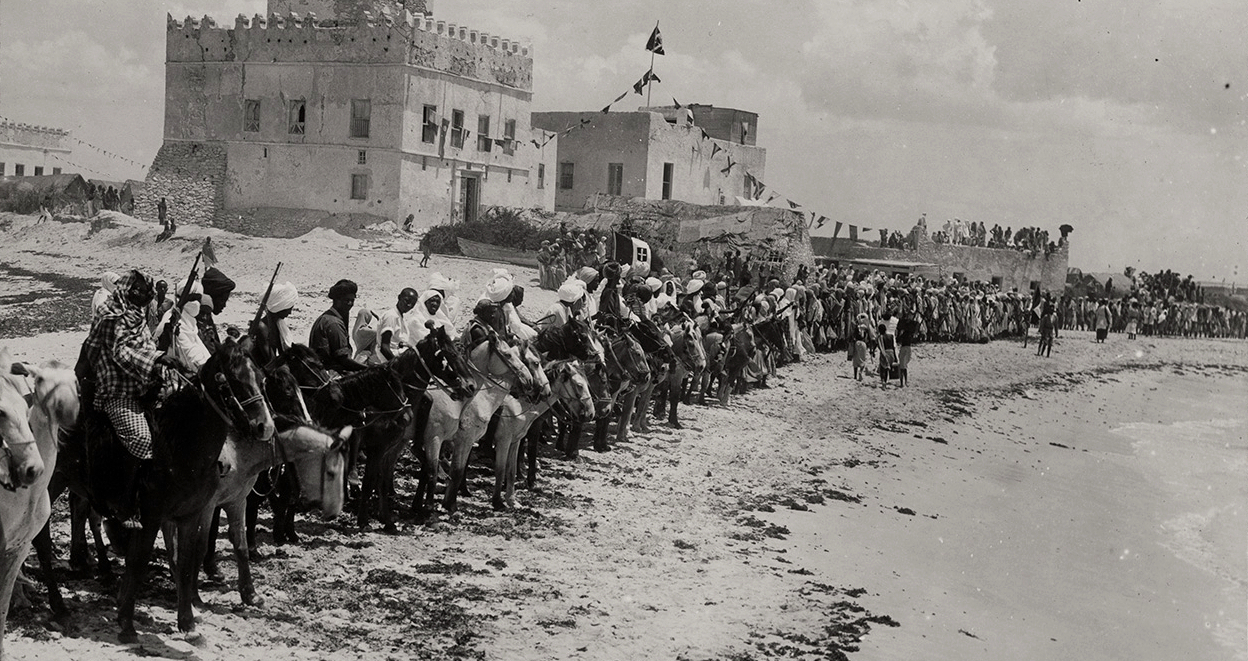
Hobyo Sultanate cavalry and fort, 1924

In the mid-1920s, under Benito Mussolini's Fascist regime, the Italian government ordered the full military occupation of Somalia through the Royal Corps of Colonial Troops, which led to armed resistance and rebellions across the country. With the arrival of Governor Cesare Maria De Vecchi on 15 December 1923, things began to change in Somalia, Italy had access to these areas under the successive protection treaties, but not direct rule. The Fascist government had direct rule only over the majority of Benadir territory. Given the defeat of the Dervish movement in the early 1920s, and the rise of fascism in Europe, on 1925, Mussolini gave the green light to De Vecchi to start the takeover of the northern sultanates. Everything was to be changed and the treaties abrogated. The Dubats colonial troops and the Zaptié gendarmerie were extensively used by De Vecchi during these military campaigns. However, unlike the southern territories, the northern sultanates were not subject to direct rule due to the earlier treaties they had signed with the Italians.

=== Italian colonial development (1920–1936) ===
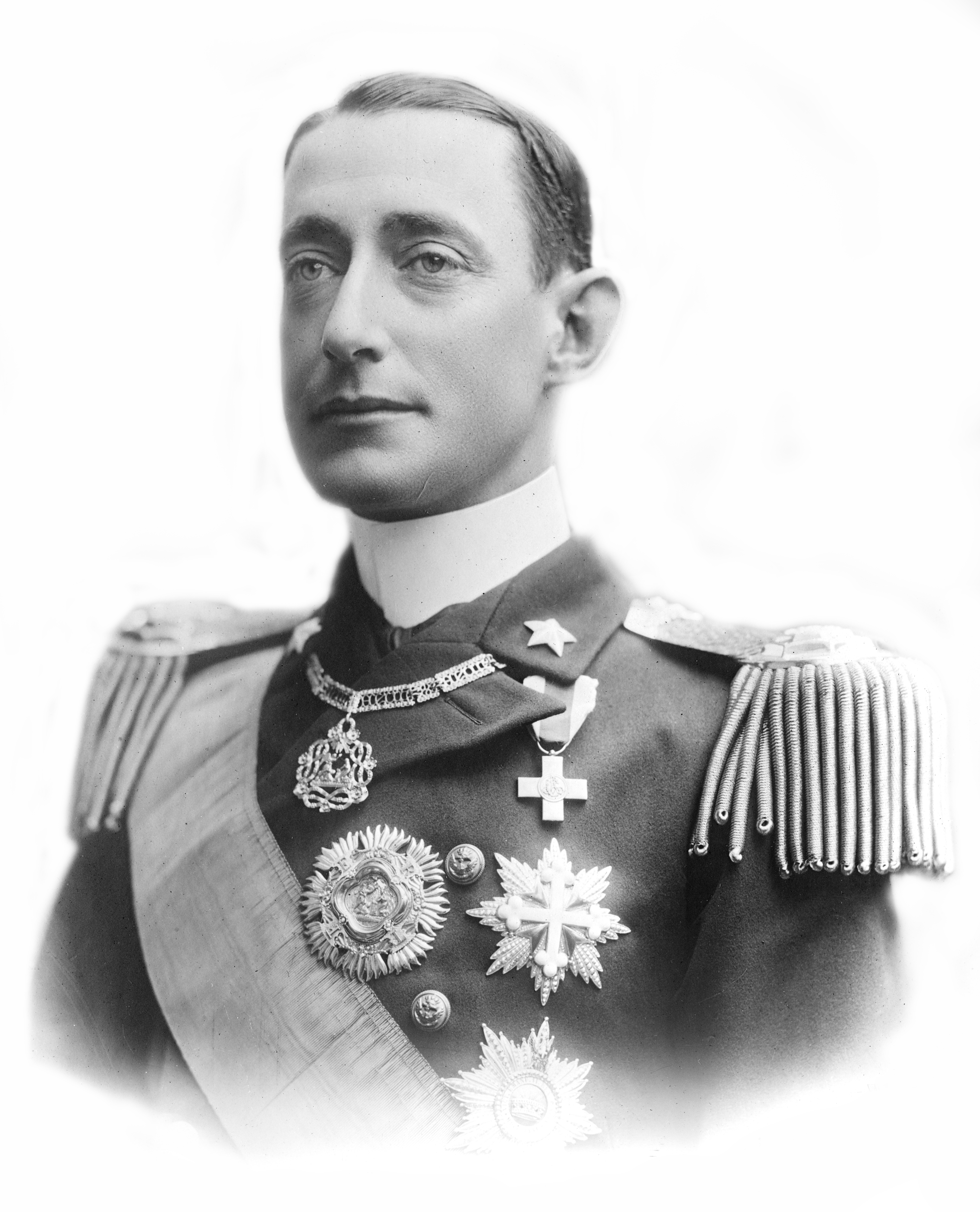
Prince Luigi Amedeo, Duke of the Abruzzi, founder of Villaggio Duca degli Abruzzi (Jowhar), the main agricultural colony in Italian Somaliland

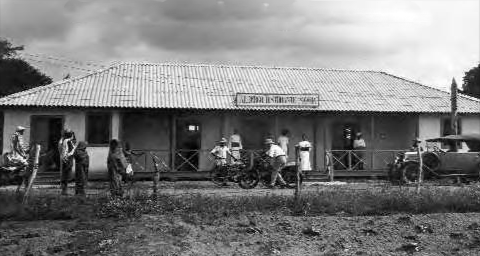
Hotel Albergo Villaggio Duca degli Abruzzi in Villabruzzi

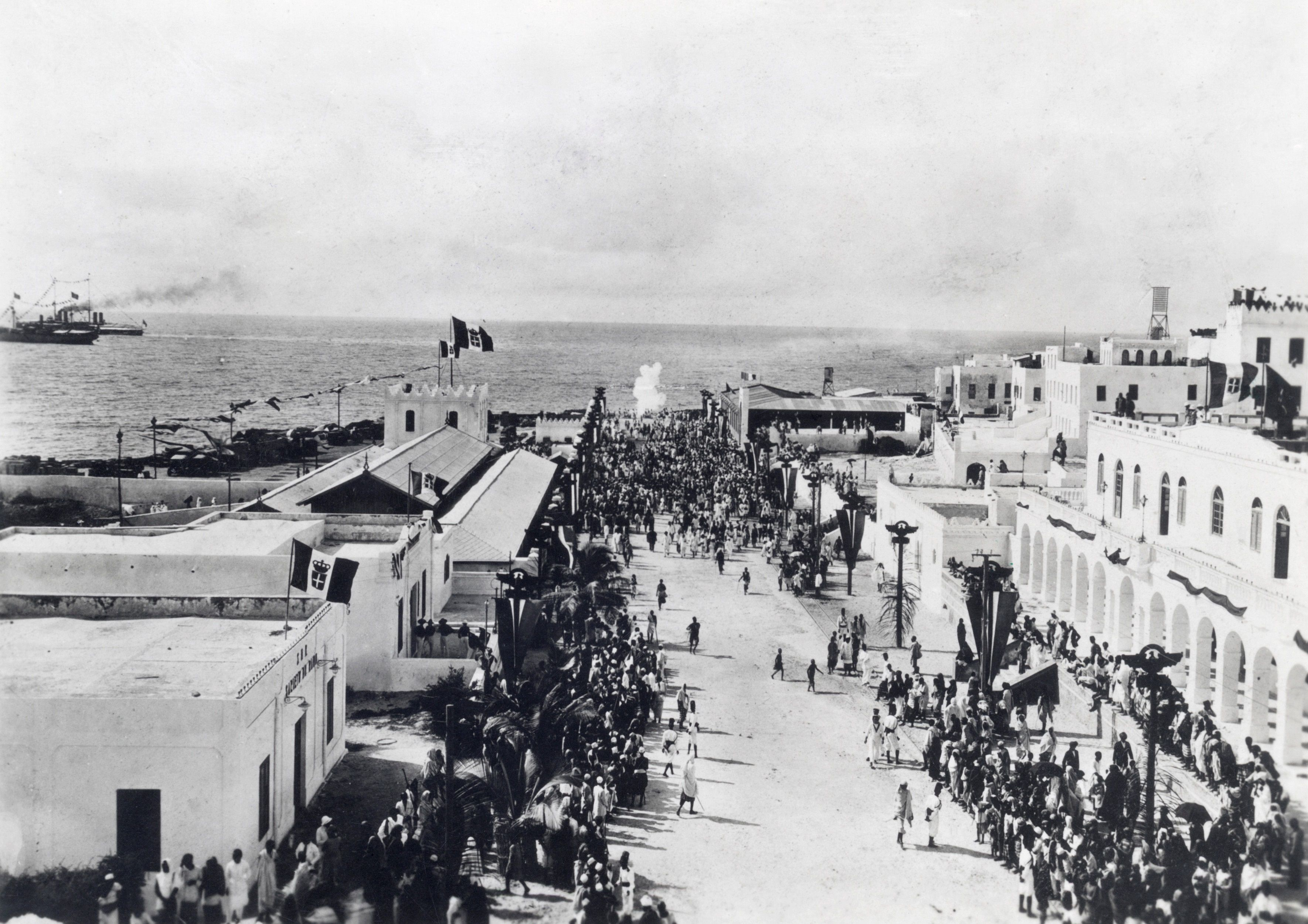
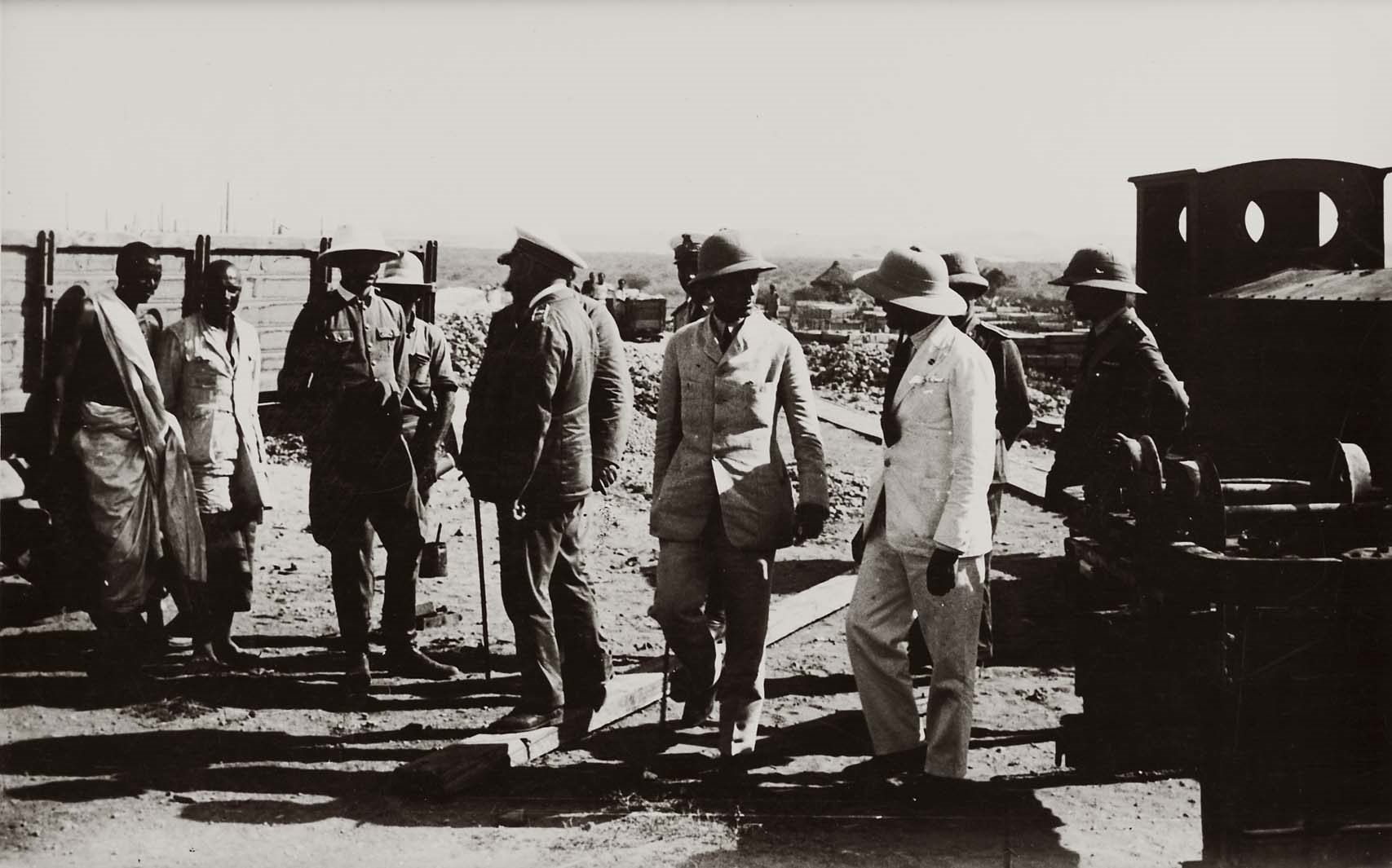
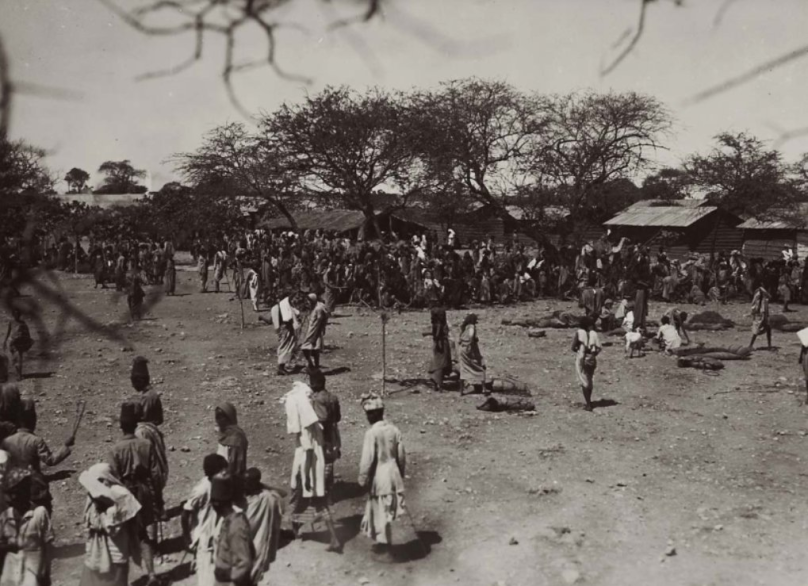
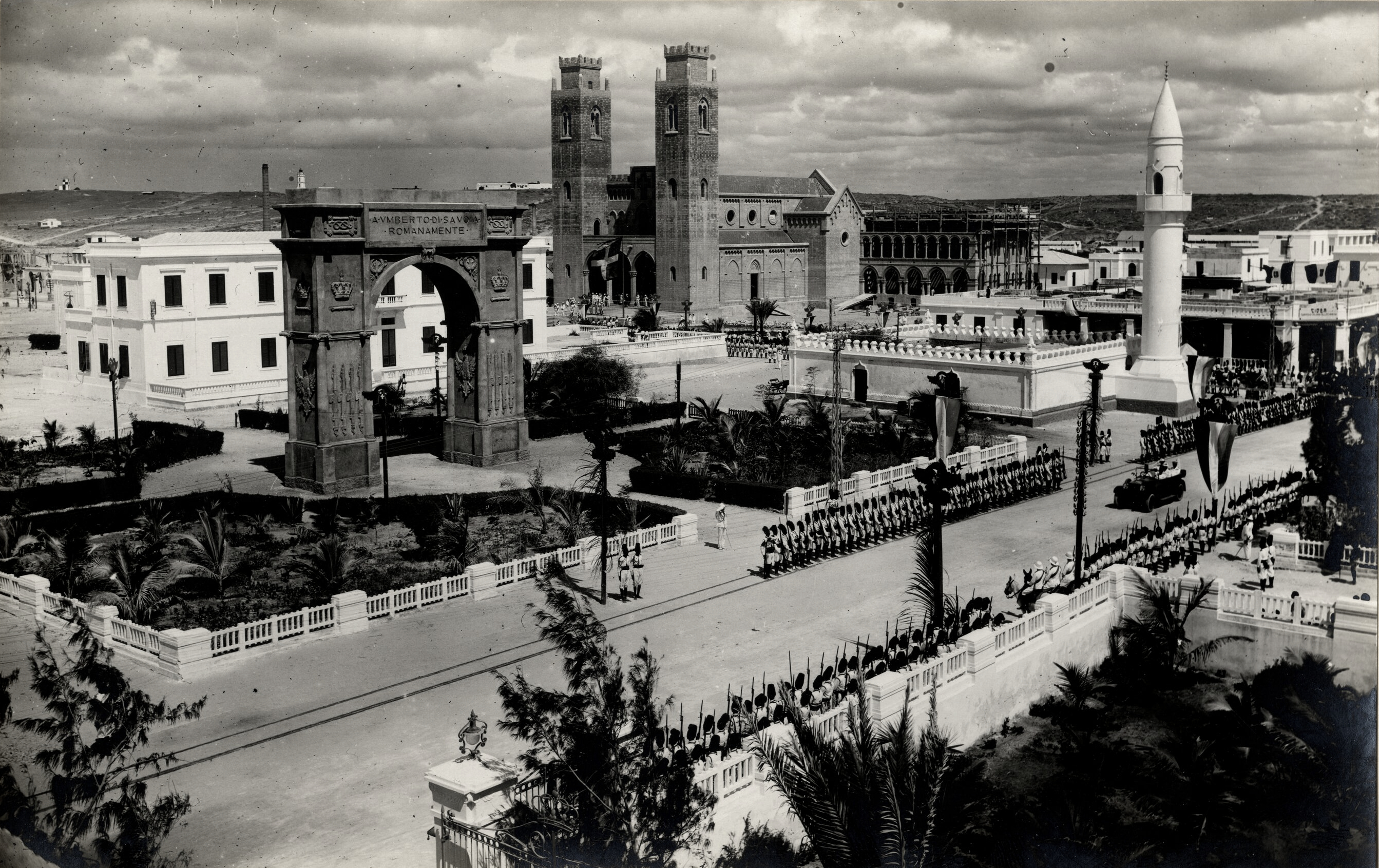
Italian Somaliland in the 1920s. Top row: Mogadishu harbor (1925) and a railway station in Vittorio d'Africa (1927). Bottom row: Baidoa market and views of Mogadishu (1928).

In 1920, a member of the Italian royal family, The Duca degli Abruzzi, who was also a famous explorer, would establish the Società Agricola Italo-Somala (SAIS) in order to explore the agricultural potential of the territory. That same year, the Duca founded the Villaggio Duca degli Abruzzi ("Villabruzzi"; Jowhar) as an agricultural settlement in Italian Somaliland. The area produced sugar, bananas and cotton. On 5 December 1923, Cesare Maria De Vecchi di Val Cismon was named Governor in charge of the new colonial administration.

In November 1920, the Banca d'Italia, the first modern bank in Italian Somaliland, was established in Mogadishu.

After World War I in 1925, Trans-Juba, which was then a part of British East Africa, was ceded to Italy. This concession was purportedly a reward for the Italians having joined the Allies in World War I.

Following an examination of the layout of the land, the Italians began new local infrastructure projects, including the construction of hospitals, farms and schools.

In 1926, the agricultural colony of Villaggio Duca degli Abruzzi comprised 16 villages, with some 3,000 Somali and 200 Italian inhabitants, and was connected by a 114 km new railway to Mogadishu. Italian colonial policy followed two principles in Italian Somaliland: preservation of the dominant clan and ethnic configurations and respect for Islam as the territory's religion.

The fascist government of Italy main goal was to colonise Italian Somalia's southern tribes and northern Muslims sultanates. After the end of the Dervish war, this event altered Italy's approach to the colony. The fascist government ordered occupation of all Somalia by force through the Royal Corps of Colonial Troops, which led to armed resistance movements across the country. Following a two year long Somali resistance, in late 1927 Italy finally extended authority across the entire territory. In 1928, the Italian authorities built the Mogadishu Cathedral (Cattedrale di Mogadiscio). It was constructed in a Norman Gothic style, based on the Cefalù Cathedral in Cefalù, Sicily. Following its establishment, Umberto, Prince of Piedmont, the heir apparent to the Italian throne, made his first publicized visit to Mogadishu. To commemorate the visit, the Arch of Umberto was constructed. The arch was built at the center of Mogadishu Garden. The Mogadishu International Airport was constructed that same year. The facility was regarded as one of the finest in the region.

In the early 1930s, the new Italian Governors, Guido Corni and Maurizio Rava, started a policy of assimilation of the Somalis. Many Somalis were enrolled in the Italian colonial army, and thousands of Italian colonists moved to live in Mogadishu. The city grew in size and some small manufacturing companies opened up. The Italians also settled in agricultural areas around the capital, such as Jowhar and Janale.

In 1930, there were 22,000 Italians living in Italian Somaliland, representing 2% of the territory's population. The majority resided in the capital Mogadishu, with other Italian communities concentrated in Jowhar, Adale (Itala), Janale, Jamame and Kismayo.

=== Italian East Africa (1936–1941) ===
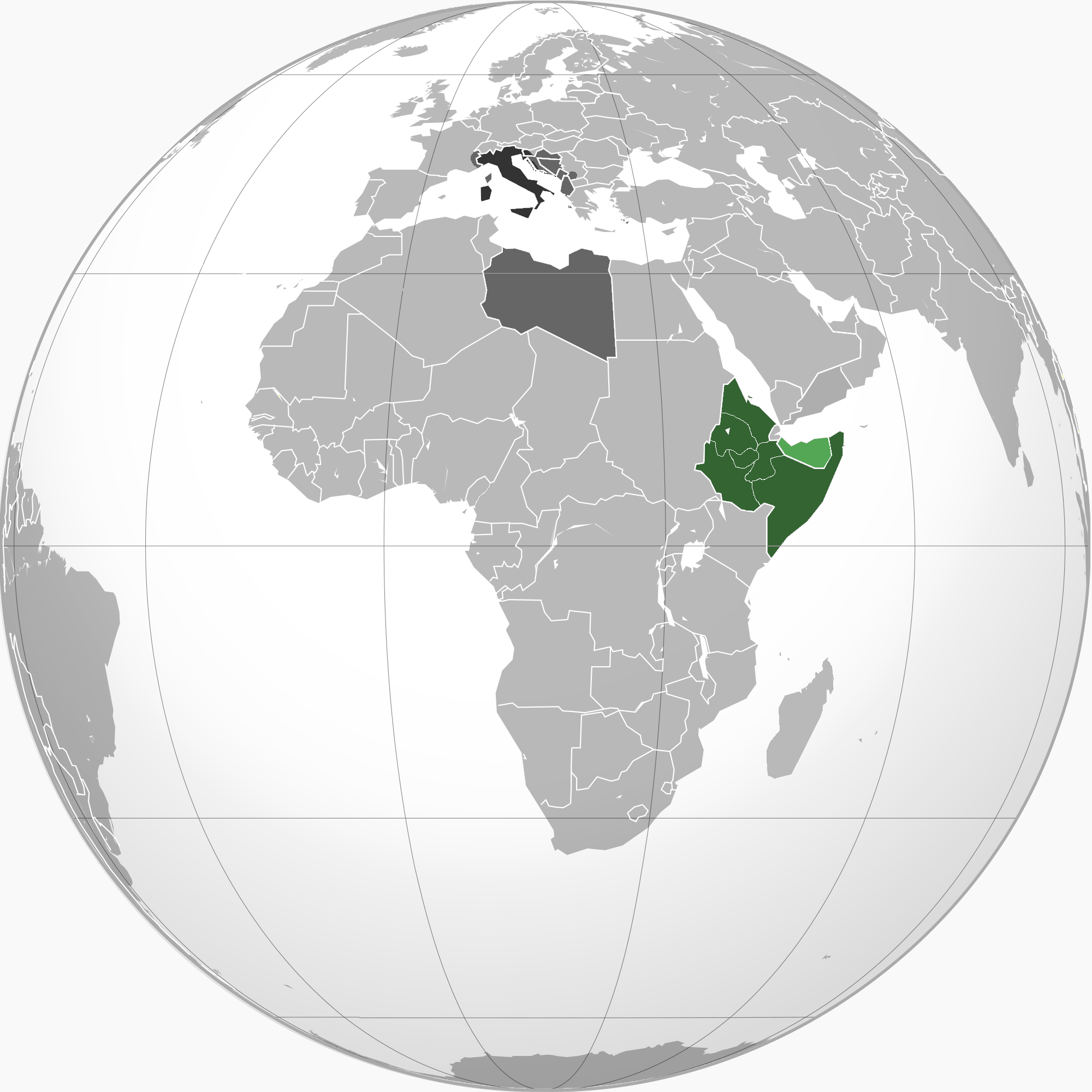
Italian East Africa in 1936 (British Somaliland annexed in 1940 after the Italian invasion)

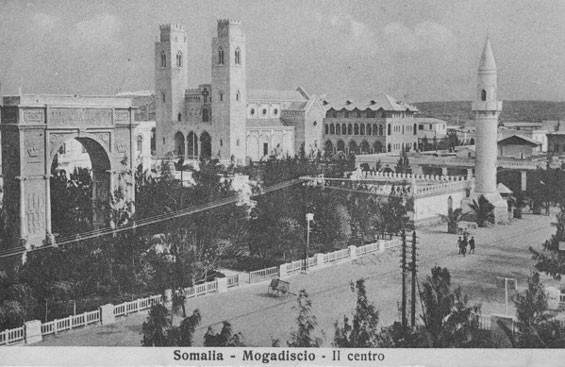
Mogadishu in 1936, with the 13th century Arba'a Rukun Mosque in the foreground, the Catholic Cathedral at the centre, and the Arch monument to commemorate King Umberto I

By 1935, Mogadishu began to serve as a major naval base and port for the Italians. The then Prime Minister of Italy, Benito Mussolini, regarded Greater Somalia (La Grande Somalia) as the crown jewel in Italy's colonial empire on the continent. He viewed himself less as an invader than as a liberator of the occupied Somali territories, including the Ogaden region, to which the Ethiopian Empire laid claim. On this basis, he justified his plan to invade Ethiopia. In October 1935, the southern front of the Second Italo-Abyssinian War was launched into Ethiopia from Italian Somaliland. The Italian General Rodolfo Graziani commanded the invasion forces in the south. Over 40,000 Somali troops served in the war, mostly as combat units. They backed up the over 80,000 Italians serving alongside them at the start of the offensive. Many of the Somalis were veterans from serving in Italian Libya. During the invasion of Ethiopia, Mogadishu served as a chief supply base.

In June 1936, after the war ended, Italian Somaliland became part of Italian East Africa (Africa Orientale Italiana) forming the Somalia Governorate. The new colony of the Italian Empire also included Ethiopia and Eritrea. To commemorate the victory, an Arch of Triumph was constructed in Mogadishu.

From 1936 to 1940, new roads were constructed in the region, such as the "Imperial Road" from Mogadishu to Addis Ababa. New railways (114 km from Mogadishu to Jowhar) and many schools, hospitals, ports and bridges were also built.

Since the start of the colony, many Somali troops fought in the so-called Regio Corpo Truppe Coloniali. The soldiers were enrolled as Dubats, Zaptié and Bande irregolari. During World War II, these troops were regarded as a wing of the Italian Army's Infantry Division, as was the case in Libya and Eritrea. The Zaptié were considered the best: they provided a ceremonial escort for the Italian Viceroy (Governor) as well as the territorial police. There were already more than one thousand such soldiers in 1922. In 1941, in Italian Somaliland and Ethiopia, 2,186 Zaptìé plus an additional 500 recruits under training officially constituted a part of the Carabinieri. They were organised into a battalion commanded by Major Alfredo Serranti that defended Culqualber (Ethiopia) for three months until this military unit was destroyed by the Allies. After heavy fighting, all the Italian Carabinieri, including the Somali troops, received full military honors from the British.

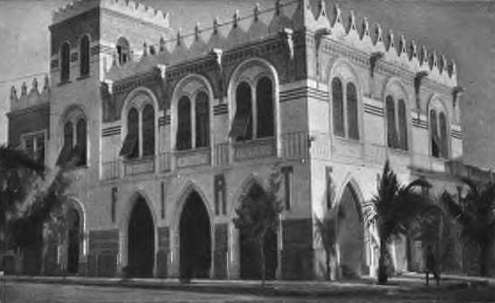
Fiat's Boero Building in Mogadishu (1940)

In 1935, there were over 50,000 Italian settlers living in Italian Somaliland, constituting 5% of the territory's population. Of those, 20,000 resided in Mogadishu (called officially in Italian Mogadiscio), representing around 40% of the city's 50,000 residents. Mogadishu was an administrative capital of Italian East Africa, and new buildings were erected in the Italian architectural tradition. Other Italian settler communities were concentrated in Jowhar, Adale (Itala), Janale, Jamame, and Kismayo. These figures do not include the more than 220,000 Italian soldiers stationed throughout Italian Somaliland during the Second Italo-Ethiopian War.

The colony was also one of the most developed in Africa in terms of the standard of living of the colonists and of the local inhabitants, mainly in the urban areas. By 1940, the Villaggio Duca degli Abruzzi ("Villabruzzi"; Jowhar) had a population of 12,000 people, of whom nearly 3,000 were Italian Somalis, and enjoyed a notable level of development with a small manufacturing area with agricultural industries (sugar mills, etc.).

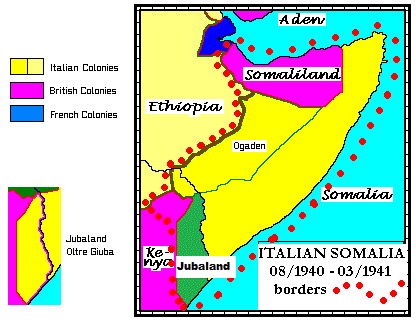
Map showing the greatest extension of Italian Somalia, in the second half of 1940, after the addition of the conquered British Somalia & some areas of Kenya

In the second half of 1940, Italian troops invaded British Somaliland, and ejected the British. The Italians also occupied Kenyan areas bordering Jubaland around the villages of Moyale and Buna, and southern borders of French Somalia). The Italians obtained in this way the unification of all Somali speaking people for the first and only time in History.

Mussolini told to a group of Somali clan leaders in September 1940 that Italy has realized their dream of a "Greater Somalia", conquering the British Somalia and areas of Kenya around Moyale. Also some southern borders of French Somalia were united. He received a very warm acclamatio from these leaders. Tripodi, Paolo. "The Colonial Legacy in Somalia"

The subsequent attempt by the Allies to capture Italian Somaliland happened some months later (in December 1940) with Operation Appearance.

In the spring of 1941, Britain also regained control of British Somaliland and conquered all Italian Somaliland with the Ogaden. However, until the end of summer 1943, there was an Italian guerrilla war in all the areas of the former Italian East Africa.

==== British Military Administration (1941–1950) ====
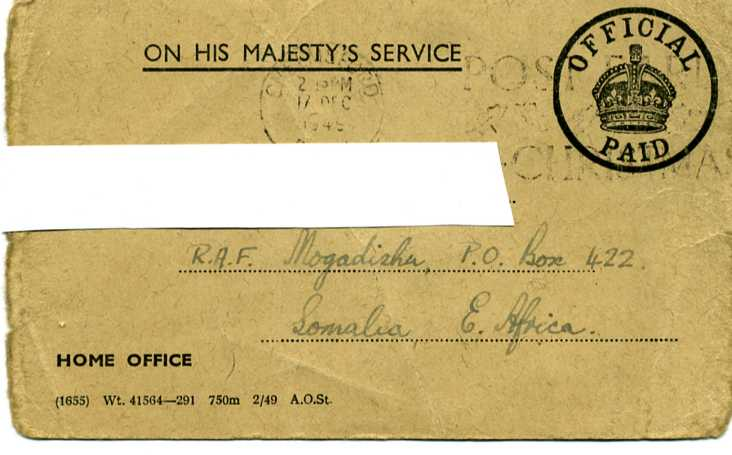
A voting registration card in Mogadishu during the British military administration (1949)

British forces occupied Italian Somaliland and militarily administered the territory as well as British Somaliland. Faced with growing Italian political pressure inimical to continued British tenure and Somali aspirations for independence, the Somalis and the British came to see each other as allies. The first modern Somali political party, the Somali Youth Club (SYC), was subsequently established in Mogadishu in 1943; it was later renamed the Somali Youth League (SYL). The SYL evolved into the dominant party and had a moderate ideology. Hizbia Digil Mirifle Somali (HDMS) party served as the principal opposition to the right, although its platform was generally in agreement with that of the SYL.

In November 1949, the United Nations finally opted to grant Italy trusteeship of Italian Somaliland, but only under close supervision and on the condition — first proposed by the Somali Youth League (SYL) and other nascent Somali political organizations, such as Hizbia Digil Mirifle Somali (later Hizbia Dastur Mustaqbal Somali, or HDMS) and the Somali National League (SNL), that were then agitating for independence — that Somalia achieve independence within ten years.

=== Trust Territory of Somalia (1950–1960) ===
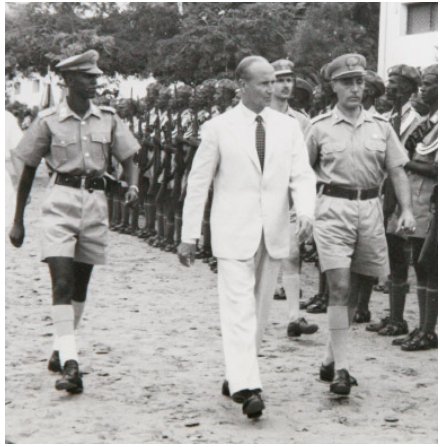
Italian ambassador Enrico Anzilotti visiting Somali troops in Mogadishu, 1956.

In 1949, when the British military administration ended, Italian Somaliland became a United Nations trusteeship known as the Trust Territory of Somaliland. Under Italian administration, this trust territory lasted ten years, from 1950 to 1960, with legislative elections held in 1956 and 1959.

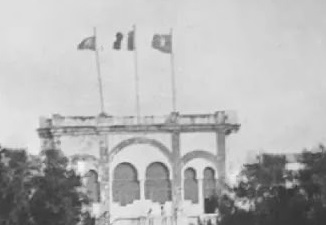
Mogadishu 1959 government building with three flags: Somali, UN and Italian flags

On 1 April 1950, the Amministrazione fiduciaria italiana della Somalia (AFIS) began its rule. A deployment of 6,500 troops landed in Somalia to assist the establishment of AFIS under the leadership of Giovanni Fornari. Fornari's three-year tenure would mark the most difficult years of the Trusteeship. The first half of AFIS's decade long rule would be marked by animosity and conflict between the Italian authorities and the Somali Youth League. Numerous SYL officials who had gained positions of prominence during the era of British Military Administration were either demoted, removed from their positions or imprisoned by Italian officials. These attempts to marginalize the league would lead to demonstrations across the country which were strongly repressed by the government, who had at the time come to decision not cooperate or concede to the SYL's plans for independence. In the 1956 parliamentary election, the Somali Youth League would win 54.29% of votes versus 26.01% for the nearest party, the Hizbia Digil Mirifle Somali. The growing power of the SYL would lead Italian officials to take a more conciliatory stance towards the organization. The SYL would also earn 416 of the 663 seats in the 1958 municipal election, with the HDMS securing 175 seats. By the 1959 parliamentary election, SYL would capture an even greater share of votes by winning 75.58% of the total ballot.

Italian was an official language in Italian Somaliland during the Fiduciary Mandate, as well as in the first years of independence. By 1952, the majority of Somalis had some understanding of the language.

=== Independence (1960) ===
On 1 July 1960, the Trust Territory of Somaliland (the former Italian Somaliland) and the former British Somaliland united to form the Somali Republic, with Mogadishu as the nation's capital. This day is celebrated as Somalia's Independence Day.

A government was formed by Abdullahi Issa and Muhammad Haji Ibrahim Egal and other members of the trusteeship and protectorate governments, with Abdulcadir Muhammed Aden as President of the Somali National Assembly, Aden Abdullah Osman Daar as President of the Somali Republic, and Abdirashid Ali Shermarke as Prime Minister. On 20 July 1961, through a popular referendum, the people of Somalia ratified a new constitution, which was first drafted in 1960.

== Governors ==
- 1889–1893 Vincenzo Filonardi
- 1893–1896 Vacant
- 1896–1897 Vincenzo Filonardi
- 1897–1897 Ernesto Dulio
- 1897–1898 Giorgio Sorrentino
- 1898–1905 Emilio Dulio
- 1905–1906 Luigi Mercatelli
- 1906–1907 Giuseppe Salvago Raggi
- 1907–1908 Tommaso Carletti
- 1908–1910 Tommaso Carletti
- 1910–1916 Giacomo De Martino
- 1916–1919 Giovanni Cerrina Feroni
- 1920–1923 Carlo Ricci
- 1923–1928 Cesare Maria De Vecchi
- 1928–1931 Guido Corni
- 1931–1935 Maurizio Rava
- 1935–1936 Rodolfo Graziani
- 1936–1937 Angelo De Ruben
- 1937–1939 Francesco Saveno
- 1939–1940 Gustavo Pesenti
- 1940–1941 Carlo De Simone

== See also ==
- Italian Somalis
- Italian Somali Wars
- Italian Eritrea
- Italian Libya
- Fourth Shore
- Villabruzzi
- Mogadiscio

== Bibliography ==
- Carpanelli, Elena; Scovazzi, Tullio (2020). Political and legal aspects of Italian colonialism in Somalia. G. Giappichelli editore. ISBN 978-88-921-8346-9. OCLC 1150848404.
- Issa-Salwe, Abdisalam M. (1996). The Collapse of the Somali State: The Impact of the Colonial Legacy. London: Haan Associates. ISBN 187420991X.
- Grosso, Mario. Chronology of Italian Somalia. Rome: Bollettino Ufficio Storico.
- Scala, Edoardo (1956). History of Italian infantries, volume IV, Somalia. Rome: Biblioteca Storica.
- Del Boca, Angelo (1996). Italians in Eastern Africa. Milan: Mondadori.
