= Juba Valley Agricultural Institute =

The Juba Valley Agricultural Institute (Somali: Machadka Beeraha Dooxada Jubba) is an academic institute within the Bardera Polytechnic College in Bardera, Somalia. It is situated within the southern Jubba Valley.

The Juba Valley region of Somalia has two of the nation's main economic sectors, agriculture and livestock. These sectors contribute over 60% of the Somali Gross Domestic Product (GDP). To develop these vital economic sectors, Bardera Polytechnic's Board started its most important operation, the Juba Valley Agricultural Institute.

== History ==
Bardera Polytechnic was founded in early 2006. Its second phase academic development included starting Somalia's first comprehensive agricultural program to give thousands of students the education and training needed to succeed in cultivating Southern Somalia’s riverine regions.

Plans for the institute were announced in 2009 Juba Valley Agricultural Institute was part of the second phase of development at Bardera Polytechnic.

== Services ==
Before the institute opened, the Somali government Ministry of Juba Valley Development and other agencies such as the Gosha & Gendiga (animal disease control services) tended to the needs of farmers and livestock herders and provided services from basic farm and animal health services to production and marketing.

Skilled volunteers and students and researchers from the institute aid farmers and livestock herders by visiting fields and pastoral communities. The Ministry of Juba Valley Development's last report indicated 30% of Somali livestock is found in the three regions of the Juba Valley.

Curriculum and first faculty members were expected to be available by May 2012. Given external funding, the program's first phase is planned to be completed by the end of 2012.
