= Pellegrino Matteucci =

Italian explorer

Doctor Pellegrino Matteucci
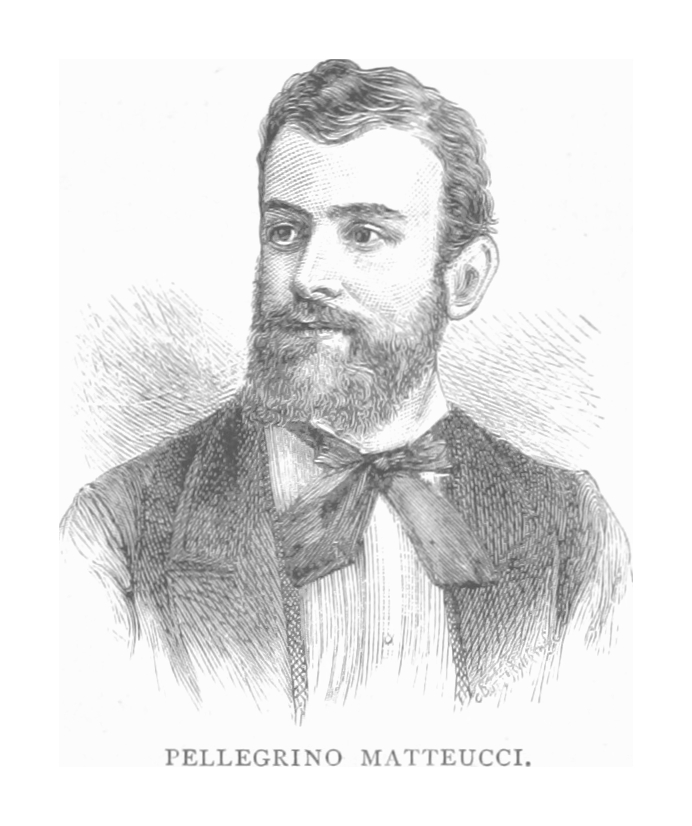
- Born: 12 October 1850; Ravenna, Italy
- Died: 8 August 1881 (aged 30); London, England
- Resting place: Bologna, Italy
- Education: University of Rome
- Organization(s): Society for Commercial Explorations; Geographical Society of Rome
- Known for: Exploration of Africa

Doctor Pellegrino Matteucci (12 October 1850 – 8 August 1881) was an Italian explorer known for his expeditions to Africa.

== Early life ==
Matteucci was born in Ravenna, Italy. His parents moved to Bologna when he was two years old. He studied medicine and Arabic at the University of Rome, intending to be a Roman Catholic missionary to Africa. His education was interrupted when the Italian army occupied Rome in 1870, but he continued it in Ravenna.

== Exploration ==
Together with Romolo Gessi, Matteucci travelled up the Blue Nile on an unsuccessful expedition to the Kingdom of Kaffa. Matteucci wrote of the trip "You can imagine the state of mind of Gessi, who has never known fear, and always conquered with few and brave soldiers; here, near to the goal, and imprisoned by a swollen river, and with few fighting-men, he is like a wounded lion." Matteucci published a history of the journey, Soudan and Galla, on his return.

In December 1878, Matteucci travelled to Abyssinia with Gustavo Bianchi at the request of the Society for Commercial Explorations in Milan. They travelled through Africa, heading to the northern border of Shewa. By the end of this expedition, Matteucci had succumbed to fever attributed to malaria four times. The journey was chronicled in Matteucci's book In Abyssinia.

Matteucci's last journey, started in spring 1880, took him from the Red Sea to the Atlantic Ocean, passing through Egypt, Darfur, and Wadai en route to an English settlement at the mouth of the Niger River. It was sponsored by the Geographical Society of Rome. Prince Giovanni Borghese, the youngest member of that family, accompanied the expedition as far as Wadai. While in Wadai, Matteucci and a young naval officer accompanying him, Lieutenant Alfonso Maria Massari, convinced the Sultan of Wadai to spare the lives of 400 Italian prisoners of war. The Sultan had imprisoned the explorers for 113 days before permitting them to enter his kingdom. The explorers travelled from Sawakin on the Red Sea over Khartum, through Darfur, south along Lake Chad, through Kanem-Bornu, through Kano and Bida, to the delta of the River Niger. They covered an average of 14 miles (23 km) a day, and a total distance of 3,000 miles (4,800 km). On the Gulf of Guinea, Matteucci's expedition found passage on a ship to England. Matteucci left few notes and letters from this trip, because of his fevers, inflammation of the eyes, and periods of imprisonment along the way.

== Death ==
Following the final expedition, Matteucci arrived in Liverpool and took the train to London, where he suffered a severe fever. Despite the aid of doctors, he died the following day, 8 August 1881, in a London hotel. His body was taken to Bologna by Massari.

== Works ==
- La spedizione italiana all' Africa equatoriale (in Italian). Bologna: Felsinea. 1875. OCLC 38783352.
- Sudan e Gallas [Soudan and Galla] (in Italian). Milan: Fratelli Treves. 1879. OCLC 9909312.
- In Abissinia: viaggio [In Abyssinia] (in Italian). Milan: Fratelli Treves. 1880. OCLC 457461525.
