= Sheikh Abdi Abikar Gafle =

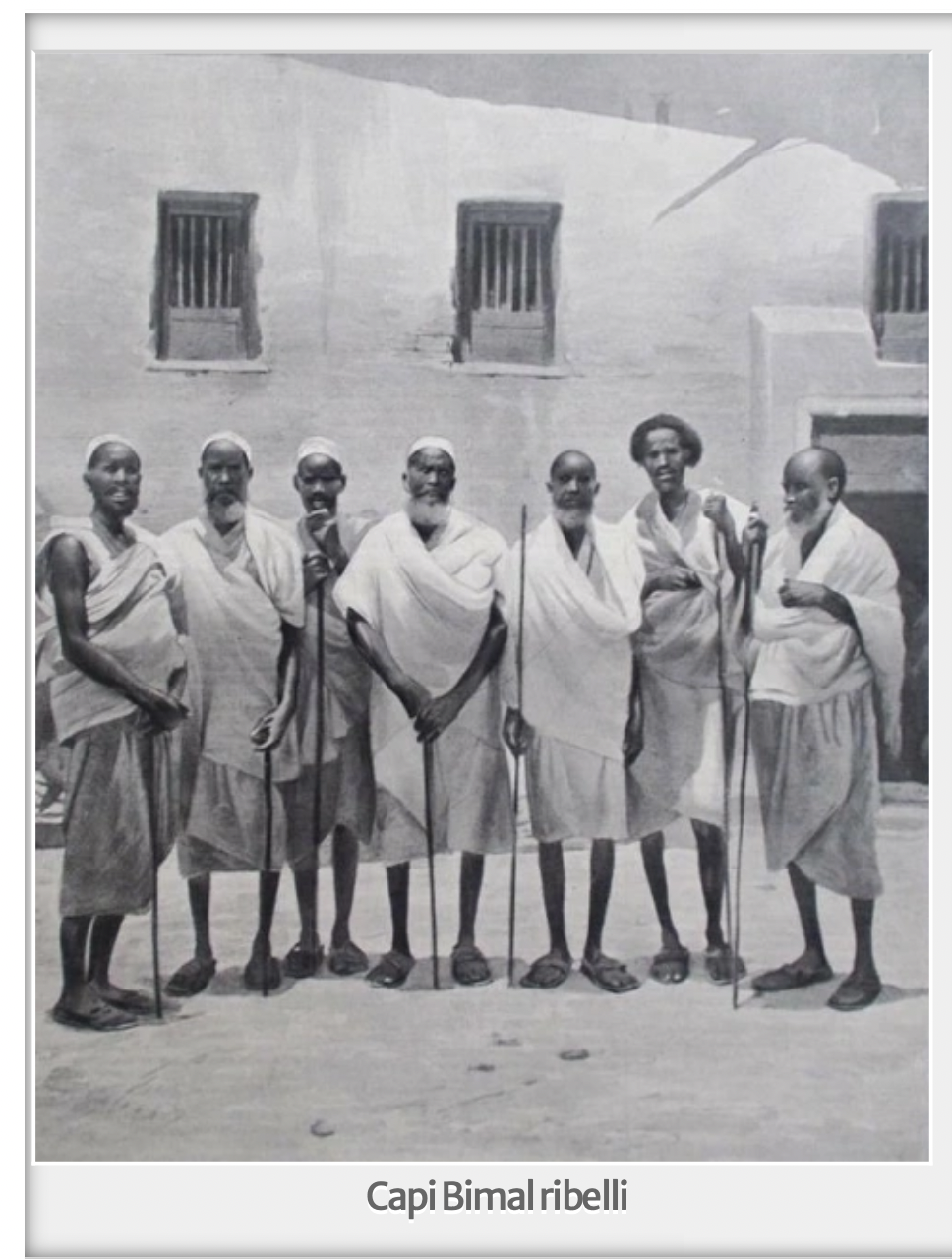
Biimaal rebel leaders in Merca

Sheikh Abdi Abukar Gaafle, Somali: (Sheekh Cabdi Gaafle), was a leader of the Biimaal Revolt against Italian occupation of southern Somalia. Born in Armadow (Ceelwareegow) near Marka District, Somalia in 1852, he died in 1922 in Laantabuur, Raaxoole District, Somalia. He is described as one of the best known resistance leaders in the history of southern Somalia.

== History ==
Sheikh Abdi Abikar Gāfle or also more famously known as Gāfle (Somali: Sheekh Cabdi Abiikar "Gaafle"). A famous Bimaal ma’allin (teacher-sheikh) and warrior born in ‘Armadobe village in 1852. He was also a prominent figure in the Bimāl Revolt against the Italians. He met his end in 1922.[1]

He grew up finishing his Quranic education and studies at home, he was afterwards sent for higher Islamic education to Ceel Jaale center close to Merca. He studied the subjects of:

1.Fiqh (Islamic jurisprudence)

2.Tafseer (Qur'anic translations and interpretations),

3.Hadith (Prophet Muhammad’s tradition, Sunnah).[2]

Sheikh Abdi Abikar Gāfle learned from well known sheikhs at that time like Sheikh Usman Sheikh Hassan and Sheikh Muhammad Abdalla, also known as 'Baarmawaaye'. Gaafle continued to become a well-known individual in the Bimal community.

In 1888, Gaafle started to travel increasingly all over the Shabelle Valley preaching his ideology, teaching and warning the public and about the Italian colonizers.

=== The Bimal Revolt ===
Gāfle took part in the Igalle shir(clan council) in June 1896 and led an army against the Italians. Gāfle was behind the alliance with the Dervishes and their leader Sayid Mohamed. Although the Dervishes provided Gāfle with firearms, they would not fight with him. Gāfle is said to have continued his resistance until 1908.
