= Gustavo Bianchi =

Italian 19th-century explorer

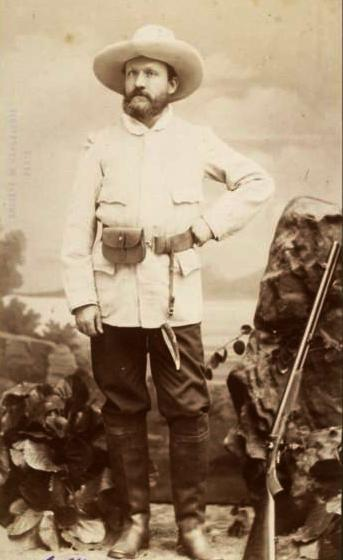
Gustavo Bianchi

Gustavo Bianchi (21 August 1845 - 7 October 1884) was a nineteenth-century Italian explorer. He travelled in Ethiopia and Eritrea, on the eve of the Italian colonial expansion.

== Early life ==
He was born in Ferrara, then part of the Papal States, and grew up in nearby Argenta. He started a military career in the Italian army: he studied at the Military Academy of Modena, and took part in the Third Italian War of Independence. However, he later had to quit because of myopia, and found a job in a merchant firm in Milan.

In 1876, as Orazio Antinori from the Italian Geographical Society led an exploring expedition to Ethiopia, Bianchi unsuccessfully applied to join it. Two years later, however, the Milan-based Society for Commercial Exploration in AfricaSociety for Commercial Exploration in Africa organised another journey to the area, under the direction of Pellegrino Matteucci, and this time he managed to join it.

== First travel ==
The expedition, which was financed by a consortium of Lombard industrialists, had the purpose of investigating whether the Horn of Africa could become an outlet for the sale of Italian goods. The group landed in Massawa, and was supposed to travel through Northern Ethiopia before reaching Shewa, where also the Antinori expedition had arrived in the meantime. However, the political tensions between the Tigray-based Emperor Yohannes IV and King Menelik of Shewa prevented it from going any further than Gojjam. In summer 1879, all the expedition members left for Italy, except for Bianchi, who remained in the area and eventually travelled to Shewa and the Oromo region. He also interceded with ras Adal Tesema (an ally of Yohannes IV), in order to free another Italian explorer, Antonio Cecchi, who had been imprisoned in the southern Kingdom of Gera. He came back to Italy in March 1881, and described his journey in a book published in 1884, "Alla terra dei Galla" (Into the Land of the Oromo people).

== Second travel and death ==
His report on the commercial opportunities of Ethiopia was rather bleak, and he thought that there was little that Italy could export to the region. Nevertheless, he volunteered to lead another expedition organised by the Society for Commercial Exploration in Africa in 1883: the aim was to look for land connections between the Italian possession of Assab (by then still the only outpost that country had on the Red Sea coast) and the interior. Despite the warnings and suggestions of Yohannes IV, who had received the explorer in Debre Tabor, Bianchi chose to pursue the route he had decided in advance, and was murdered by brigands in the Danakil region. His remains were found only in 1928.

== Sources ==
- Bianchi, Gustavo (1884). Alla Terra dei Galla. Milano: Fratelli Treves.
- Milanini Kemény, Anna (1973). La Società d'Esplorazione Commerciale in Africa e la politica coloniale (1879–1914). Firenze: La Nuova Italia.
- Del Boca, Angelo (1992). Gli Italiani in Africa Orientale : vol. 1 dall'Unità alla Marcia su Roma. Milano: Oscar Mondadori.
- Veratti, Stefania (2009). Mirco, Peccenini (ed.). L'Africa di Gustavo Bianchi tra esplorazione scientifica e letteratura esotica (Alla terra dei Galla). Ferrara: Badiglione Editore.
- Carlo, Zaghi, ed. (1930). L'ultima spedizione africana di Gustavo Bianchi. Diari, relazioni, lettere e documenti editi ed inediti, 2 voll. Milano: Alpes.
