= 1956 Italian Somaliland parliamentary election =

Election

Parliamentary elections were held in Italian Trust Territory of Somaliland in February 1956. The result was a victory for the Somali Youth League (SYL), which won 43 of the 60 elected seats in the Territorial Council.

== Electoral system ==
The Territorial Council had a total of 70 seats, of which 60 were elected in 25 constituencies ranging in size from one to five seats. The other ten seats were reserved for minority groups; four for Italians, four for Arabs, one for Indians and one for Pakistanis. Only men over the age of 21 were allowed to vote, whilst candidates had to be at least 30, literate in both Arabic and Roman alphabets, and have been resident in Somalia for at least a year prior to the elections.

The elections were direct in towns and municipalities, but indirect in rural areas, where members were elected by 613 "shirs" (open councils) between November 1955 and January 1956. The electoral laws were not applied entirely to the shirs, where voters could be as young as 15.

The election was marred by voting irregularities. The total number of votes cast was around half the total population of the territory, 1,250,000. However, the total amount of eligible voters was no more than 300,000. Fraud came from tribal chiefs who registered non-existent voters to inflate results for their preferred candidates.

== Results ==
Party	Votes	%	Seats
Somali Youth League	333,820	54.29	43
Hizbia Digil and Mirifle	159,967	26.01	13
Somali Democratic Movement	80,866	13.15	3
Somali National Union	21,630	3.52	0
Marehan Union	11,358	1.85	1
Afgoi-Audegle	3,441	0.56	0
Somali Hawiya Youth Union	1,846	0.30	0
Six Shidle	1,550	0.25	0
Somali Bagiuni Fichirini	426	0.07	0
Reserved seats			10
Total	614,904	100.00	70
Source: Furtado
