= Antonio Cecchi =

Italian explorer (1849–1896)

Antonio Cecchi (Pesaro, 29 January 1849 – Lafolè, 26 November 1896) was an Italian explorer who spearheaded the Italian expansion into Somalia.

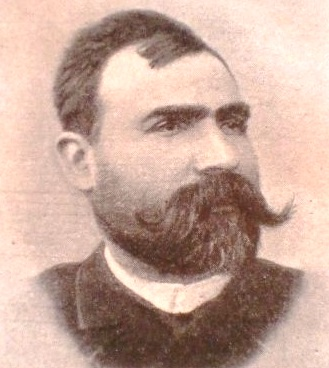
Portrait of Antonio Cecchi

== Biography ==
Cecchi was a captain in the Italian Royal Navy and previously paid frequent visits to various ports along the Red Sea. In 1877 Cecchi was chosen by the Italian Geographic Society to write up astronomical and topographical observations as a member of the expedition led by Sebastiano Martini Bernardi to rescue the explorer Orazio Antinori, who was stranded in the province of Shewa in Ethiopia. Later, with Giovanni Chiarini, he reached the Kingdom of Limmu-Ennarea, encountering serious difficulties due to the harshness of the terrain and the hostility of various local leaders. In February 1879, they were imprisoned at the residence of the queen of Gera, who believed that they were agents of the king of Shewa, Menelik II. Freed thanks to the efforts of the explorer Gustavo Bianchi, he returned to Shewa, where Orazio Antinori was waiting for him at Let-Marefià and then sailed back to Italy in March 1881. Once back in Italy, Cecchi published in three volumes his famous work Da Zeila alle frontiere del Caffa, which contains information about the territories he had visited.

In 1885 Cecchi was part of the Italian military expedition to seize the port of Massawa, under the leadership of Colonel Tancredi Saletta, he then became the Italian consul in Aden. In 1890 he traveled to Zanzibar where he met up with the Italian consul Vincenzo Filonardi and was granted an audience with Sultan Sayyid Barghash bin Said of Zanzibar in the hopes of gaining a protectorate over the East African coast. Cecchi soon realized that the sultan was already heavily influenced by other European powers—initially through the Franco-British declaration of 1862 and later by expanding German ambitions—and was therefore unwilling to make any further concessions. However, Filonardi had his own private company, and the sultan of Zanzibar had leased the Benadir area (Barawa, Merca, Mogadishu, and Warsheikh) to him under an agreement on 12 August 1892 to repay debts for Italian influence.

After Filonadri departed in the autumn of 1893 to administrate his new territories, Cecchi was then appointed as the new consul of Zanzibar. However, Filonardi's company was not provided with sufficient capital to build settlements, cities, and ports and to ensure their security. The company never engaged in, and could not afford to engage in, activities that required such investments during its three-year existence. And as a result, Filonadri started to fall into bankruptcy. Cecchi then created his own company called the Benadir Company which then took control of the Benadir concessions with the consent of the Italian government.

Cecchi immediately planned to expand Italian control into the interior hinterlands, he attempted to establish relations with the Sultanate of Geledi with the hopes of creating an alliance and eventually a protectorate. The Sultanate was in the shadow of its former power, the Geledi confederation headed by the Gobroon sheikhs of Afgooye had lost much of its cohesiveness as the nineteenth century drew to a close and its new leader, Osman Ahmed, was considerably weaker than his predecessors. Despite this, the Italians faced hostility from the Wa'daan clan, a small group of pastoralists that had recently asserted their independence from the Geledi and were fiercely opposed to any comprise with foreigners. They were influenced by Sheikh Ahmed Haji Mahhadi, an Abgaal from Mogadishu who fled to Wa'daan territory where he started preaching against the infidels.

Cecchi decided to organize an expedition consisting of 70 askaris and 15 Italian officers into the interior of Somali territory to open up communications with the Geledi and discover fertile areas. On the night of 25 November 1896 in Lafolé (25 kilometers south of Mogadishu), the expedition set up camp where they were spotted by scouts belonging to the Wa'daan clan. On 1:00 AM 26 November 1896, the camp was attacked by the Wa'daan who overwhelmed them with poison arrows. The Italians attempted to defend themselves, and after seven hours of fighting all members of the expedition including Cecchi were dead with the exception of three who miraculously managed to escape back to Mogadishu.

For the Italians, the massacre at Lafolé was a disaster, the ambush happened in the same year as the Ethiopian victory at Adwa and essentially halted Italian expansionism in Somalia and the Horn of Africa for the next decade. Somalis call this year Ahad Cecchi (the Year of Cecchi).
