= Jubba Valley =

River valley in East Africa

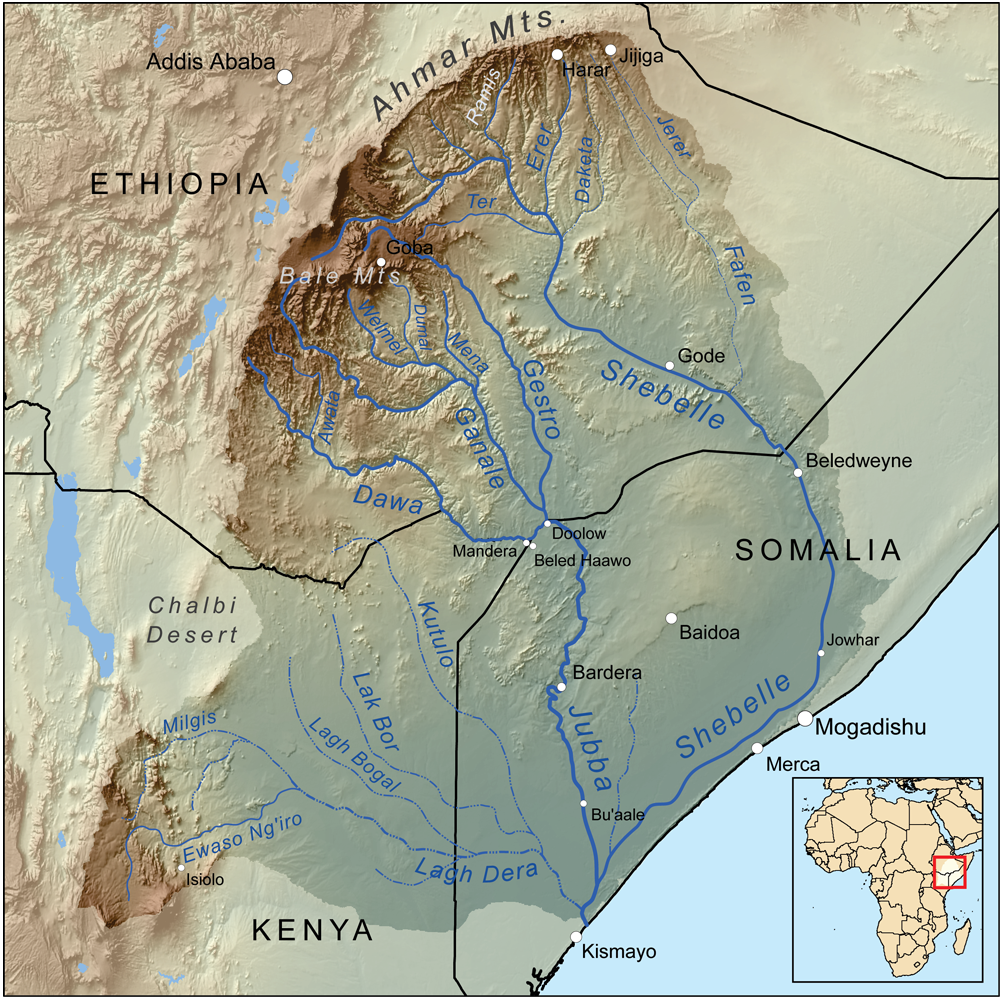
A map of the Jubba River and Shebelle River drainage basin

The Jubba Valley (Somali: Dooxada Jubbada) is a valley in East Africa.

It follows the line of the Jubba River north from the Indian Ocean to the Somalia-Ethiopia border. The valley then splits, one branch following the Dawa River west along the Ethiopia-Kenya frontier, then north into Ethiopia, and the other branch follows the Ganale Dorya River north into Ethiopia.

Along with the Shebelle Valley, and the nearby Chamo and Abaya lakes, the Jubba Valley is considered an Endemic Bird Area by Birdlife International.

The Somali section of Jubba Valley is known as Jubaland.

== See also ==
- Nugaal Valley
