= Nimmo, Somalia =

Nimmo is an historical town in Somalia. Located south of the capital Mogadishu, it consists of ruined stone houses and mosques. The Somali scholar Uways al-Barawi in the 19th century established a Madrassa here.

== See also ==
- Gondal
- Abasa
- Architecture of Somalia
- Somali aristocratic and court titles
