= Shebelle Valley =

River valley in Ethiopia and Somalia

Coordinates: 04°44′N 45°12′E

The Shebelle Valley (Somali: Dooxada Shabeelle), also spelled Shabeelle Valley, is a valley in the Horn of Africa.

It follows the line of the Shebelle River north from the Somali Sea through Somalia and into Ethiopia.

Along with the Jubba Valley and nearby lakes Chamo and Abaya, the valley is considered an Endemic Bird Area by Birdlife International.

== See also ==
- Nugaal Valley
