= Wa'daan =

Subclan of the Hawiye

وعدان

Total population
- 45,500

Languages
- Somali

Religion
- Islam

Related ethnic groups
- Abgaal, Habargidir, Duduble, Sheekhaal and other Hawiye clans

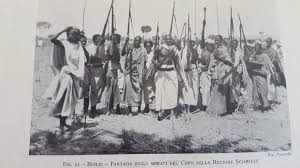
Wacdaan Soldiers in Afgooye

Wa'daan (Somali: Wacdaan, Arabic: وعدان) is a sub-clan of the Hawiye and the even larger Samaale clan. They are part of the Gorgaarte subclan of the Hawiye clan.

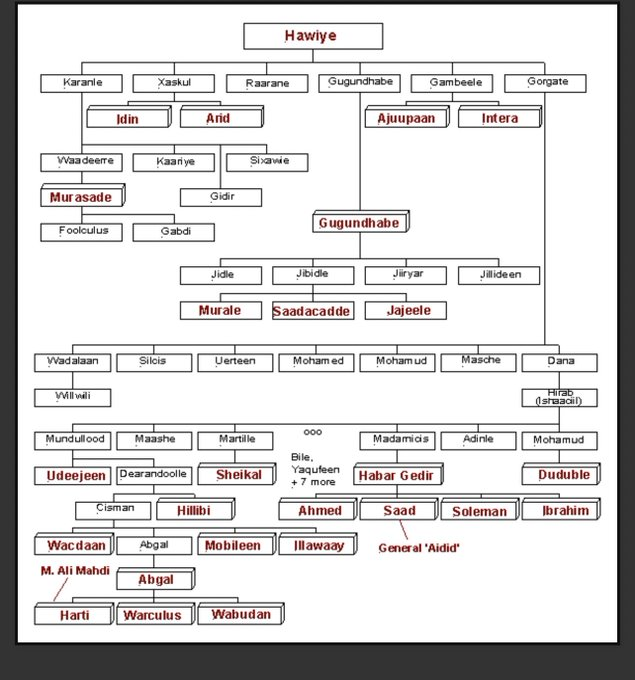
Hawiye clan tree (simple version).

== Early history of the Wacdaan ==
The Wacdaan rose to prominence in the Shabeelle River region following the disintegration of the Ajuuraan Sultanate, which controlled a large part of southern Somalia. The Geledi and Wacdaan worked together to overthrow the Silcis, another sub-clan of the Hawiye, as Somali oral history shows.

== Overthrow of Silcis ==
According to Cassanelli, “the Geledi (Rahanweyn) and Wa'dan (Darandolle Gurgate) allied to drive the Sil'is from Afgoy”.

== Distribution ==
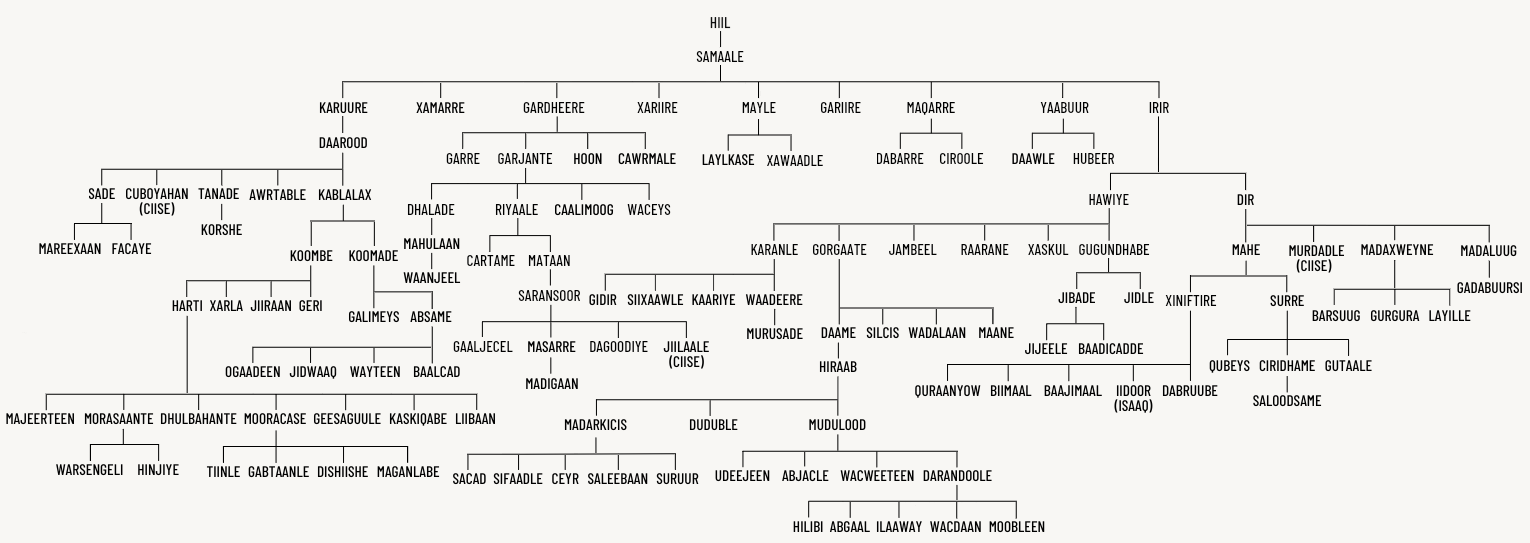
Genealogical tree of Somali clans

Wacdaan primarily live in the Lower Shabelle region of Somalia. They primarily inhabit the city of Afgooye but also live in adjacent cities such as Lafoole, Jaziira, Maracade, Qoryooley. They also live in celsha biyaha the section of the Banaadir region (Mogadishu)

== Lineage ==
  - Hawiye
    - Hiraab
      - Mudulood
        - Darandoole
          - Wacdaan Cismaan
          - Maalinle
          - Maxamed Maalinle(7)
          - Ibrahim Maalinle (2)

          A)Maxamedmed Shimbir Ibrahim Moldhere
          B)Abuukar Mooldheere Shimbir Ibraahim Maalinle

            - Maxamed Maalinle
              - Arda Nabi Maxamed Maalinle
              - Tifow Maxamed Maalinle
                - Abdiwahid Maxamed Maalinle
                - Kaalmooy Maxamed Maalinle
                - Muuse Maxamed Maalinle
                - yabar Maxamed Maalinle
                - Dhicis Maxamed Maalinle
            - Samakaay Wacdaan
            - Warqatinle Wacdaan
            - Warqab Wacdaan
