= Royal Corps of Eritrean Colonial Troops =

Italian colonial soldiers recruited from Eritrea

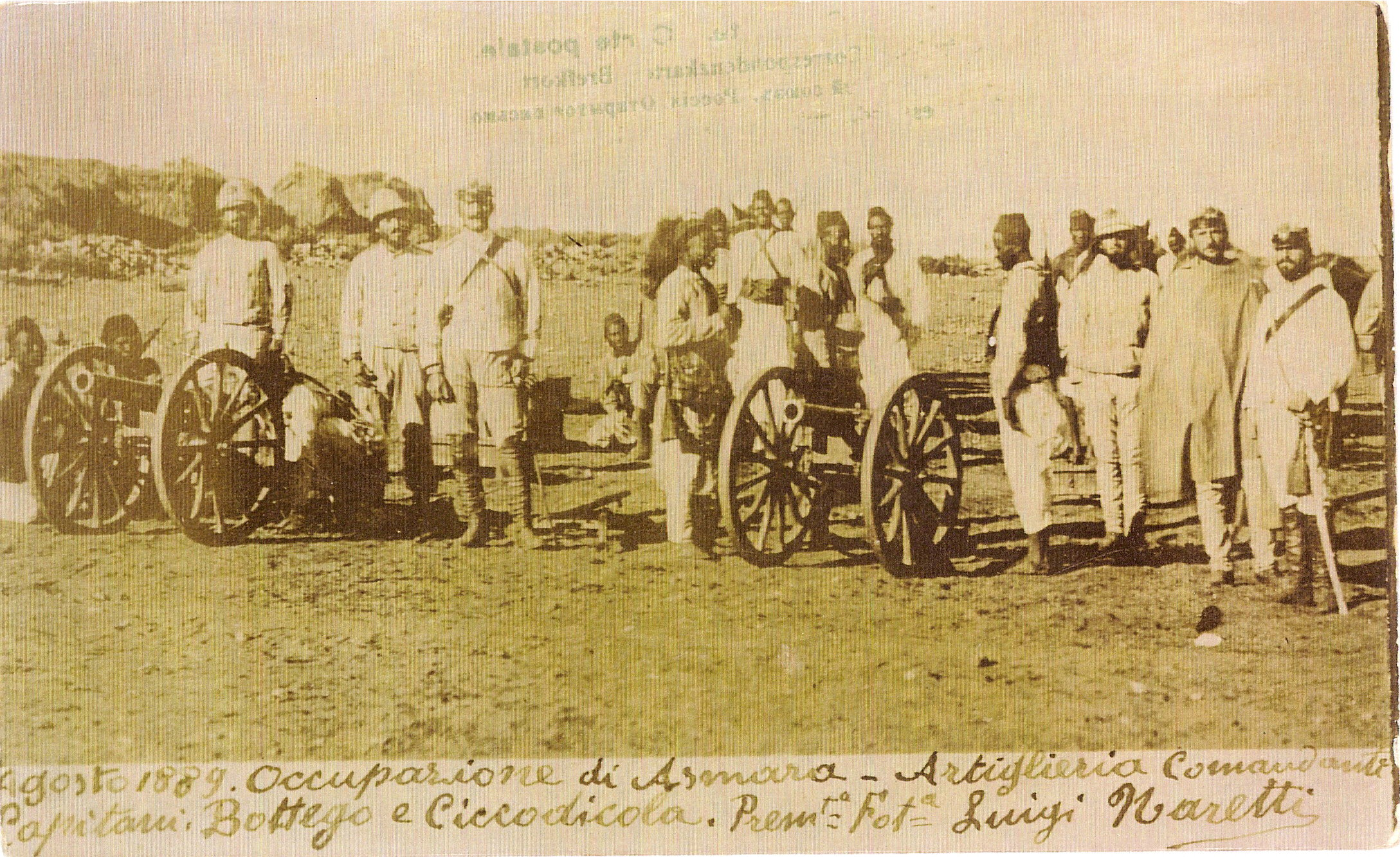
Eritrean Ascaris in 1889

The Royal Corps Of Eritrean Colonial Troops (Italian: Regio corpo truppe coloniali d'Eritrea) were indigenous soldiers from Eritrea, who were enrolled as askaris in the Royal Corps of Colonial Troops (Regio Corpo di Truppe Coloniali) of the Royal Italian Army (Regio Esercito) during the colonial period 1889–1941.

== Characteristics ==
These regular troops played an important role in the initial conquest of the various colonial possessions of the Kingdom of Italy. They subsequently acted as garrison and internal security forces in the Italian Empire, and finally served in large numbers during the Italian conquest of British Somaliland and the East African campaign of 1940-41 .

== History ==
Except for the German parachute division in Italy and the Japanese in Burma no enemy with whom the British and Indian troops were matched put up a finer fight than those Savoia battalions at Keren (Eritrea). Moreover, the Colonial troops, until they cracked at the very end, fought with valour and resolution, and their staunchness was a testimony to the excellence of the Italian administration and military training in Eritrea.

The Italian Army made extensive use of locally recruited indigenous soldiers in Italian East Africa. These troops comprised infantry, cavalry and some light artillery units. They were recruited initially from Eritreans and subsequently from Somalis, with Italian officers and some non-commissioned officers. The Italian Askaris fought in the First Italo–Ethiopian War, the Italian-Turkish War, the Second Italo-Abyssinian War and World War II (East African Campaign).

Out of a total of 256,000 Italian troops serving in Italian East Africa in 1940, about 182,000 were recruited from Italian Eritrea, Italian Somalia and the just recently occupied (1935–36) Ethiopia. In January 1941, Commonwealth and Free French forces invaded Italian-occupied Ethiopia and the majority of the newly recruited Ethiopian Ascaris serving with the Italian Army in East Africa deserted. Most of the Eritrean Ascaris however remained loyal until the Italian surrender four months later.

== Development of the Ascari ==
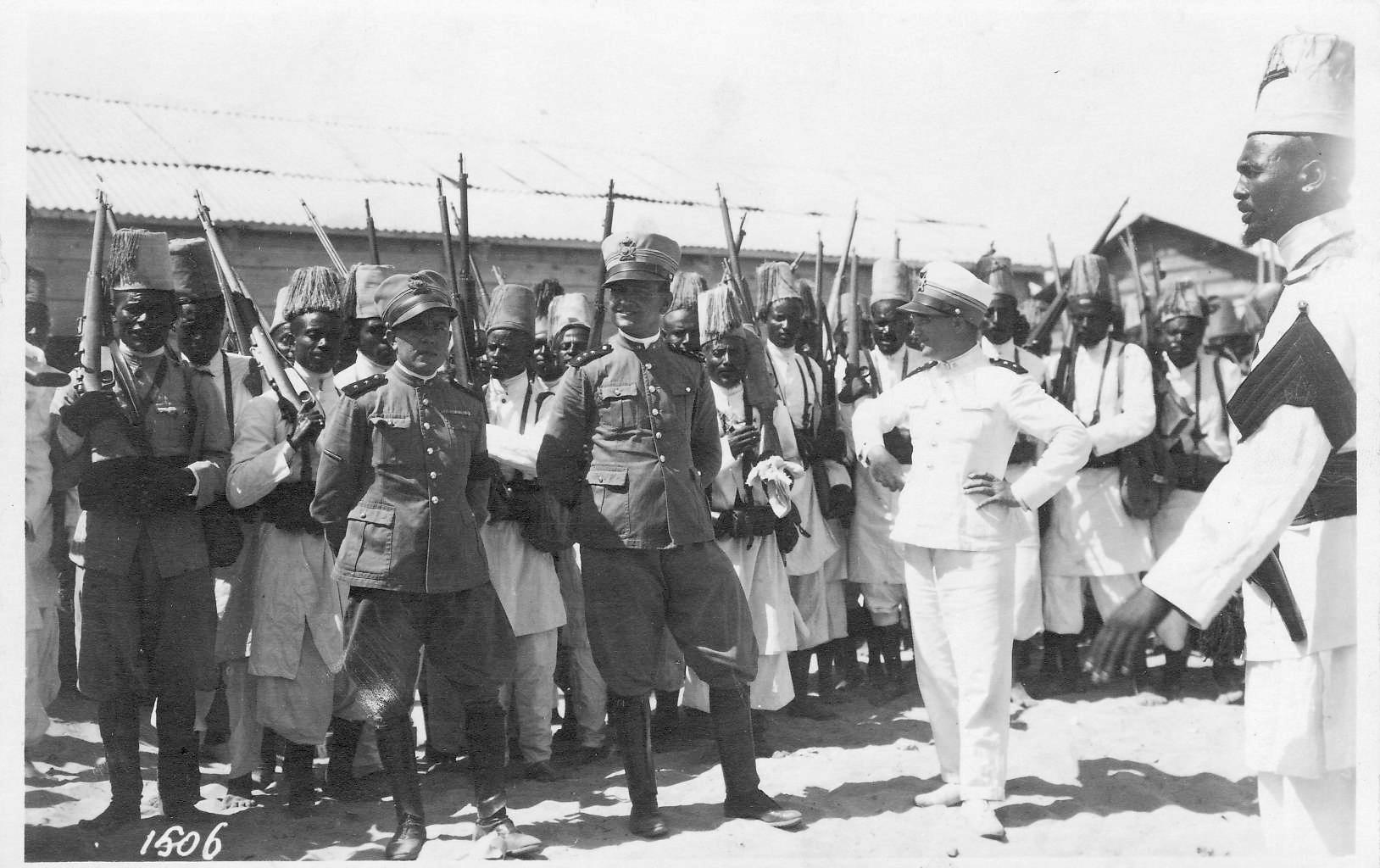
Luigi Lusignani in command of the XXVI Eritrean Battalion in Libya

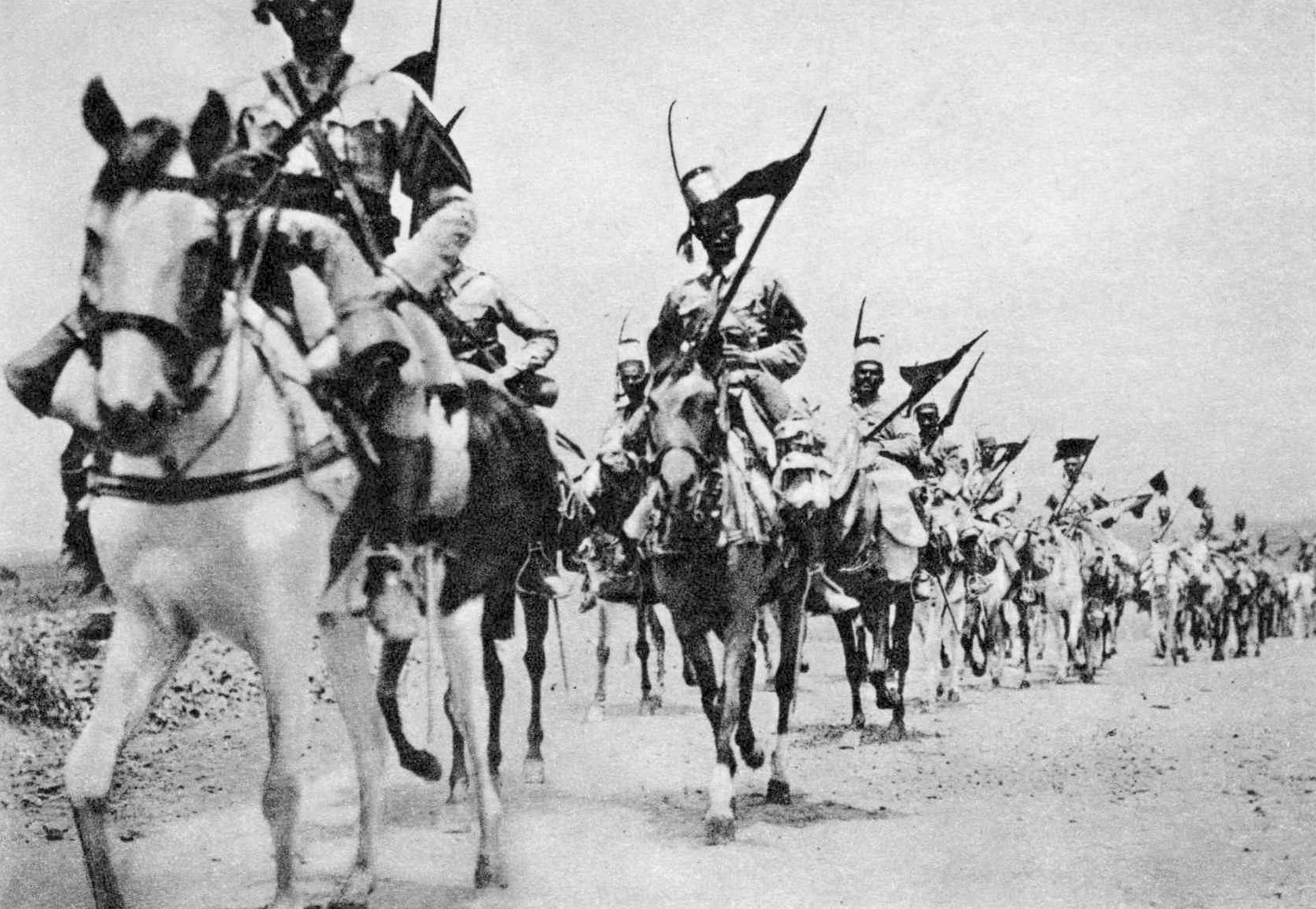
Eritrean cavalry of the Italian colonial troops during the March of the Iron Will

The name "ascar" is the Arab word for "soldier". The Eritrean Ascari originated from a mercenary Arab group employed by the Ottoman Empire and called Basci Buzuks. This irregular force was created in Eritrea by the Albanian adventurer Sagiak Hassan, who worked for local Eritrean tribes in the second half of the 19th century.

In 1885 the Italian colonel Tancredi Saletta, commanding officer of the Italian troops during the conquest of Eritrea, brought the Basci Buzuks (with their armaments and families) into Italian service as irregular auxiliaries. In 1889 the first four regular battalions of Eritrean soldiers were created in Asmara. Those Eritrean troops were incorporated into the Italian colonial Army with the name Ascari. They were successfully used in battle by the Italians, for the first time, against the Dervisci in Sudan.

Initially the Eritrean Ascari comprised only infantry battalions, although Eritrean cavalry squadrons (Penne di Falco) and mountain artillery batteries were subsequently raised. By 1922 units of camel cavalry called "meharisti" had been added. Those Eritrean camel units were also deployed in Libya after 1932. During the 1930s Benito Mussolini added some armored cars units to the Ascari.

Prior to World War I service with the Ascari had become the main source of paid employment for the indigenous male population of Eritrea. During the expansion required by the Italian invasion of Ethiopia in 1936, 40% of eligible Eritreans were enrolled in these colonial troops.

== Uniforms and ranks ==
Until 1915 Eritrean units wore white uniforms comprising long coats and loosely cut trousers for all occasions. Khaki drill clothing was subsequently adopted for active service and ordinary duties, though the white uniforms were retained for ceremonial duties.

Eritrean regiments in Italian service wore high red fezzes with coloured tufts and waist sashes that varied according to each unit. As examples, the 17th Eritrean Battalion had black and white tufts and vertically striped sashes; while the 64th Eritrean Battalion wore both of these items in scarlet and purple.

The Eritrean Ascari had the following ranks, from simple soldier to senior non commissioned officer: Ascari - Muntaz (corporal) - Bulukbasci (lance-sergeant) - Sciumbasci (sergeant). The Sciumbasci-capos (staff-sergeants) were the senior Eritrean non-commissioned officers and were chosen according to their fighting performance in battle. All of the commissioned officers of the Eritrean Ascari were Italian, who wore similar uniforms and insignia to their counterparts in the regular Italian Army

== Performance in battle ==
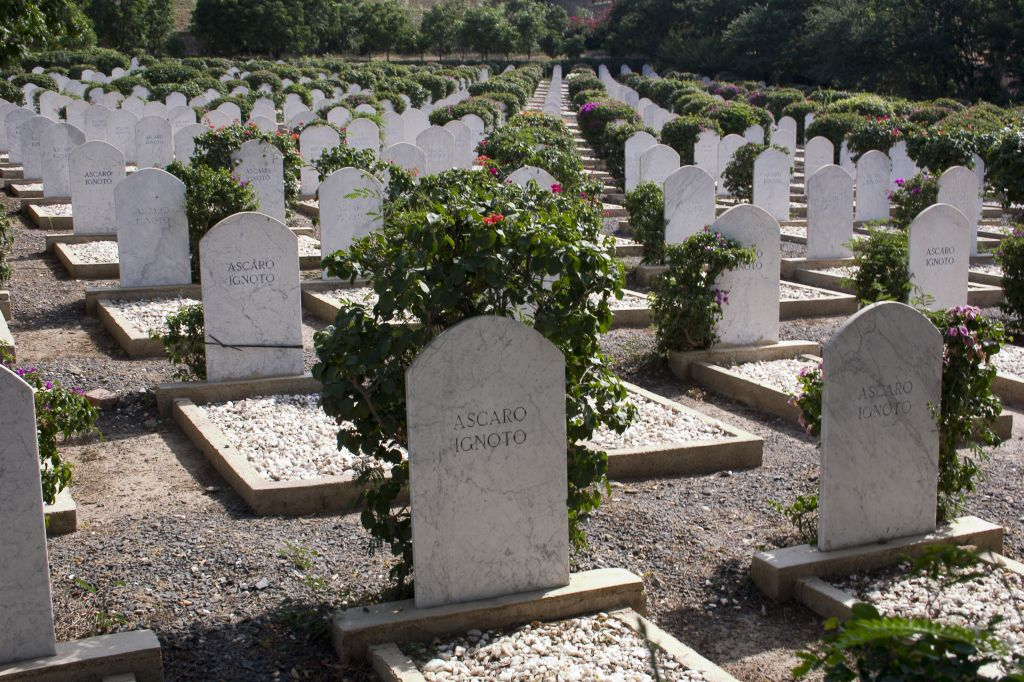
Graves of unknown Ascaris killed in 1941 during the Battle of Keren

The Eritrean Ascari were considered the best of Italy's colonial soldiers, with a reputation similar to that of the Gurkhas in the forces of the British Empire. They were accordingly widely employed in other Italian colonial possessions in Africa. Eritrean NCOs were seconded to newly raised Somali and Ethiopian units after 1936.

Notable events in the history of Italy's Eritrean Ascaris included:

1. First Battle of Agordat - (Mahdist War)
2. Second Battle of Agordat - (Mahdist War)
3. Battle of Kassala - (Mahdist War)
4. Battle of Coatit - (First Ethiopian War)
5. About six thousand Eritrean Ascaris, serving in both infantry and artillery units, were present at the Battle of Adwa where they fought against 120,000 Ethiopians on 1 March 1896. Of these, 2,000 ascari were killed and 800 were captured and mutilated by having their right hands and left feet amputated by the victorious Ethiopians, who considered them to be traitors.
6. In the Italian conquest of Ethiopia (1935–1936) the veteran Eritrean Ascaris, with their high morale and aggressive spirit, played a key role, often taking the lead during attacks. About 60,000 Eritreans served in both regular ascari units and in irregular bands. Nearly 5,000 Eritrean Ascaris were killed in this war.
7. During World War II a number of Eritrean Ascari were awarded the Gold Medal for Military Honor at both the Battle of Cheren and at the Amba Alagi. Some of the remaining Ascari fought with lieutenant Amedeo Guillet in his Italian guerrilla against the Allies after the Italian Army surrender in Gondar in November 1941.

== Amedeo Guillet and his Gruppo Bande Amhara ==
One of the most famous Italian officers who commanded groups of Eritrean Ascari in Ethiopia and Eritrea was Amedeo Guillet.

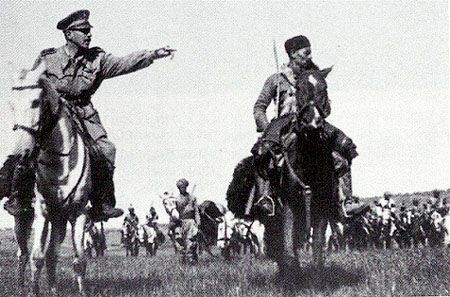
Amedeo Guillet and his Gruppo Bande a Cavallo Amhara

At the beginning of World War II the Italian Viceroy Amedeo Duke of Aosta gave lieutenant Guillet command of the 2,500 strong Gruppo Bande Amhara, an irregular unit made up mainly of recruits from Ethiopia's region of Amhara. This force was primarily a cavalry one, but also included camel mounted troops and some Yemeni infantry led by Eritrean Ascari NCOs.

At the end of 1940 the Allied forces faced Guillet on the road to Amba Alagi close to Cherù. He was charged with the task of slowing the Allied advance from the North-West. His ascaris had some success in doing this but suffered many casualties. Guillet's most important battle happened towards the end of January 1941 at Cherù when he decided to attack enemy armoured units. At dawn the Gruppo Bande Tigre, armed only with sabres, rifles and hand grenades charged an Allied column which included armoured vehicles. They passed unhurt through the Allied force who were caught unaware. Guillet then turned to charge again. In the meantime however, the Allies had organised themselves and fired horizontally with their howitzers, inflicting heavy losses on the Italian-led troops and their horses. This was the last cavalry charge Commonwealth forces faced and the last but one in the history of Italian cavalry.

Guillet's ascaris suffered losses of about 800 in little more than two years. In March 1941 his forces found themselves stranded outside the Italian lines. Guillet began a private war against the Allies. Hiding his uniform near a farm owned by Italian colonists, he conducted guerrilla raids with his remaining askaris against Allied forces for almost eight months. He was one of the most famous Italian "guerrilla officers" in Eritrea and northern Ethiopia during the Italian guerrilla war, a failed attempt to prevent Italian East Africa from being dissolved.

== Eritrean Ascari after World War II ==
Many Eritrean Ascari fought for the independence of Eritrea after WWII. Among these was Hamid Idris Awate, nicknamed the Father of Eritrea because he fired the first shots of the Eritrean War of Independence against the Ethiopians.

After the official end of the Italian Empire in 1947, the Italian government had created organizations dedicated to the welfare of former Ascaris living in Italy and Eritrea.

In 1950 the Italian authorities created a pension fund for nearly 140,000 Eritrean Ascari who had served in the Italian Colonial Army. Even if the amount was minimal (the equivalent of $100 yearly), this was paid through the Italian Embassy in Asmara and was of some value in the underdeveloped economy of Eritrea after World War II.

During the 1992-93 UN Intervention in the Somali civil war, an elderly Ascari joined an Italian unit with his original uniform and rifle, stating that he had sworn a lifetime oath to "Italy, to the King and to the Duce." By the end of the mission he had been given the rank of marshal.

In 1993, 1,100 Ascari were still living in Eritrea. By 2006 only 260 were known to still be alive. One surviving ascari, Beraki Ghebreslasie, lives in Rome.

== See also ==
- Bands (Italian Army irregulars)
- Eritrea
- Italian Eritreans
- Dubats
- Zaptié
- Italian Empire
- Hamid Idriss Awate
- Amedeo Guillet

== Bibliography ==
- Bereketeab, R. Eritrea: The making of a Nation. Uppsala University. Uppsala, 2000.
- Lowe, C.J. Italian Foreign Policy 1870–1940. Routledge. 2002.
- Mackenzie, Compton (1951). Eastern Epic: September 1939 – March 1943 Defence. Vol. I. London: Chatto & Windus. OCLC 59637091.
- Negash, Tekeste. Italian colonialism in Eritrea 1882-1941 (Politics, Praxis and Impact). Uppsala University. Uppsala, 1987.
- Shillington, Kevin. Encyclopedia of African History. CRC Press. London, 2005. ISBN 1-57958-245-1

Volterra, Alessandro. "Sudditi coloniali< Ascari eritrei 1935-1941". FranAngeli, Milano, 2005
