= Horses in World War II =

Use of horses during World War II (1939–1945)

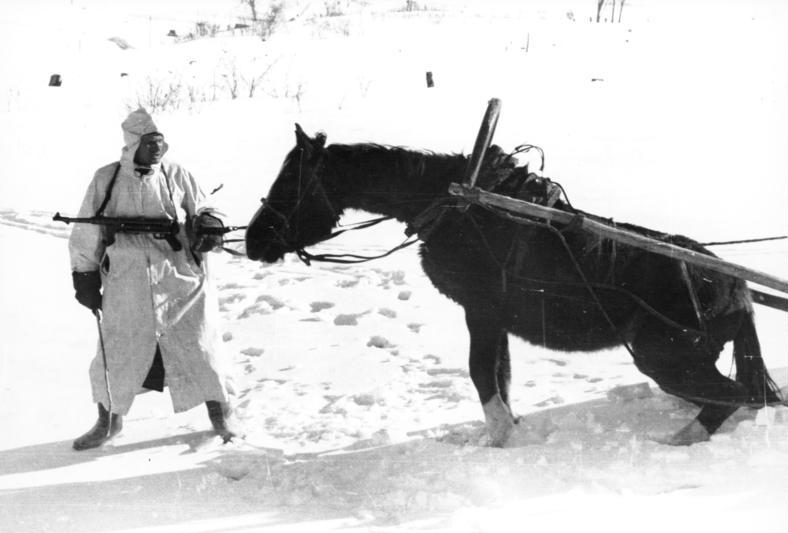
German soldier and his horse in the Russian SFSR, 1941. In two months, December 1941 and January 1942, the German Army on the Eastern Front lost 189,000 horses.

Horses in World War II were used by the belligerent nations, for transportation of troops, artillery, materiel, messages, and, to a lesser extent, in mobile cavalry troops. The role of horses for each nation depended on its military doctrines, strategy, and state of economy. It was most pronounced in the German and Soviet Armies. Over the course of the war, Germany (2.75 million) and the Soviet Union (3.5 million) together employed more than six million horses.

Most British regular cavalry regiments were mechanised between 1928 and the outbreak of World War II. The United States retained a single horse cavalry regiment stationed in the Philippines, and the German Army retained a single brigade. The French Army of 1939–1940 blended horse regiments into their mobile divisions, and the Soviet Army of 1941 had thirteen cavalry divisions. The Italian, Iranian, Japanese, Polish and Romanian armies employed substantial cavalry formations.

Horse-drawn transportation was most important for Germany, as it was relatively lacking in automotive industry and oil resources. Infantry and horse-drawn artillery formed the bulk of the German Army throughout the war; only one fifth of the Army belonged to mobile panzer and mechanized divisions. Each German infantry division employed thousands of horses and thousands of men taking care of them. Despite losses of horses to enemy action, exposure and disease, Germany maintained a steady supply of work and saddle horses until 1945. Cavalry in the German Army and the Waffen-SS gradually increased in size, peaking at six cavalry divisions in February 1945.

The Red Army was substantially motorized from 1939 to 1941 but lost most of its war equipment in Operation Barbarossa. The losses were temporarily remedied by forming masses of mounted infantry, which were used as strike forces in the Battle of Moscow. Heavy casualties and a shortage of horses soon compelled the Soviets to reduce the number of cavalry divisions. As tank production and Allied supplies made up for the losses of 1941, the cavalry was merged with tank units, forming more effective strike groups. From 1943 to 1944, cavalry gradually became the mobile infantry component of the tank armies. By the end of the war, Soviet cavalry had been reduced to its prewar strength. The logistical role of horses in the Red Army was not as high as it was in the German Army because of Soviet domestic oil reserves and US truck supplies.

== Motorization in the interwar period ==
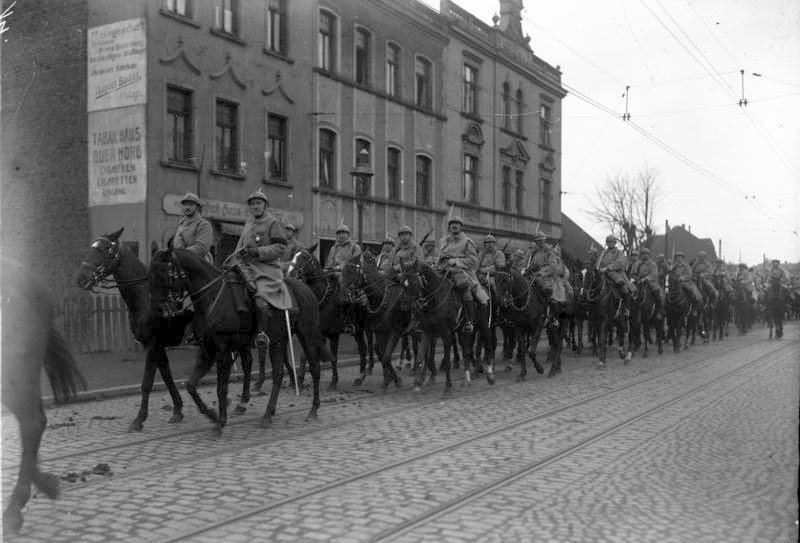
At the end of World War I the former belligerents retained masses of traditional cavalry (1923 French unit pictured) and were facing motorization to overcome the prospects of another strategic stalemate.

The trench warfare of the Western Front of World War I resulted in a strategic stalemate: defensive weapons and tactics prevailed over the offensive options available. Early tanks, supported by artillery and foot infantry, provided a weapon for breaching the front line but were too slow to turn the breach into a strategic offensive; the railroads of France and Germany provided the defending side with the ability to move troops and counterattack in sufficient time. Postwar armies concentrated on developing more effective offensive tactics through the mechanization of ground troops. The mechanization strategy was influenced by the state of economies, anticipated scenarios of war, politics and lobbying within civilian governments and the militaries. The United Kingdom, France and Germany chose three different strategies. A fourth option was chosen by the Soviet Union who, influenced by the mobile warfare experience of the Russian Civil War and the Polish-Soviet War, introduced a mechanized corps and airborne troops. Each strategy closed the gap between the capabilities of cavalry and mechanized infantry.

Another factor prompting motorization was the decline of national horse stocks and the inability to restore them in reasonable time. Of all the major powers, only the United Kingdom, weakened by the loss of Ireland, was, in part, compelled to motorize for this reason; horse stocks in Germany, the United States and the Soviet Union remained sufficient for at least their peacetime armies. In 1928, the United Kingdom became the first nation to begin replacing horse cavalry with motorized troops and by 1939 had become the first to motorize their national army, although some Yeomanry regiments plus regular cavalry units serving overseas remained mounted. British experimental armored units had performed impressively since 1926, but, facing resistance from the traditional branches of service, remained unpopular among senior officers until the Battle of France.

The French Army partially motorized their cavalry in 1928, creating divisions of dragons portés (mobile dragoons) that combined motorized and horse-mounted elements. In the following decade the French searched for a perfect mix, testing five different divisional configurations. Bulgaria, Hungary and Romania followed the French mixed pattern; Austrian and Czechoslovak mobile divisions were similar but with a higher share of horses. The Polish Army acquired tanks and the Lithuanian army acquired trucks but otherwise both remained horse-powered, World War I style armies. The United States Cavalry commanders approved the French strategy but made no radical changes until the 1940 reform that completely eliminated horse troops.

German analysts rejected the French concept of mixed horse-and-motor troops as unworkable. The Wehrmacht had its own opponents of mechanization, but with Adolf Hitler's support Ludwig Beck, (Note: Beck and von Fritsch secured resources and provided full administrative support for Guderian's panzer project Guderian's own memoirs paint Beck as a backward anti-panzer general, perhaps a reaction to Beck's involvement in the plot against Hitler) Werner von Fritsch and Heinz Guderian succeeded in forging a compact but effective panzer force that coexisted with masses of traditional foot infantry and horse-drawn artillery throughout World War II. (Note: Mobile panzer troops did not exceed 20% of the whole German Army headcount) Willis Crittenberger observed that "the French are limited to the armored division, while the Germans have created an armored branch." By 1939, the Wehrmacht disbanded their 18 cavalry regiments, leaving a single active cavalry brigade; the cavalrymen with their war horses were integrated into infantry divisions.

Motorization of the 1930s raised a number of concerns, starting with the need to secure a continuous fuel supply. The new formations had a significantly larger footprint on the march: the 1932 French motorized division took up 52 km (32 mi) of road space compared to 11.5 km (7.1 mi) for a horse-mounted formation, raising concerns about control and vulnerability. The Spanish Civil War and other conflicts of the 1930s did not provide definite solutions and the issues remained unresolved until the onset of World War II. Only the German blitzkrieg achieved in the Battle of France finally persuaded the militaries of the world, including the United States, that the tank had replaced the horse on the battlefield.

== Horse logistics ==
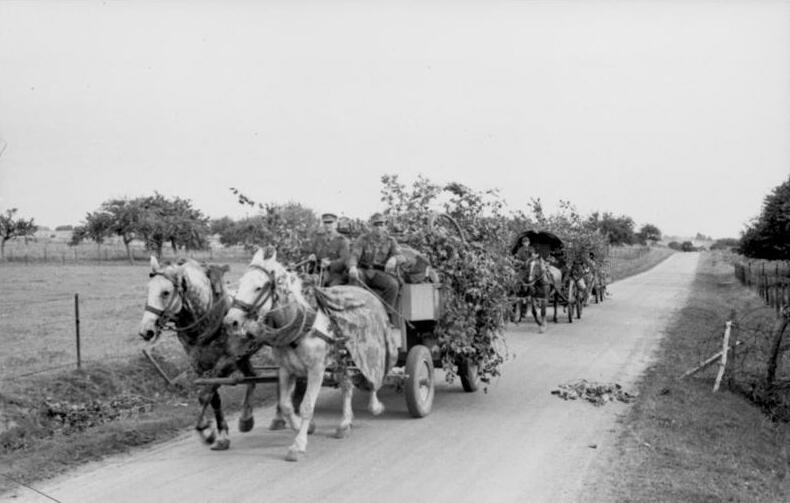
German horse-drawn supply train with pneumatic tires in France, 1944

German and Soviet armies relied heavily on work horses to pull artillery and supplies. Horses seemed to be a cheap and reliable transport especially in the spring and fall mud of the Eastern Front but the associated costs of daily feeding, grooming and handling horses were staggering. In theory horse units could feed off the country, but grazing on grass alone rendered horses unfit for work and the troops had no time to spend searching the villages for fodder. Hard-working horses required up to twelve pounds of grain daily; fodder carried by the troops made up a major portion of their supply trains.

Horses needed attendants: hitching a six-horse field artillery team, for example, required six men working for at least an hour. Horse health deteriorated after only ten days of even moderate load, requiring frequent refits; recuperation took months and the replacement horses, in turn, needed time to get along with their teammates and handlers. Good stables around the front line were scarce; makeshift lodgings caused premature wear and disease. Refit of front-line horse units consumed eight to ten days, slowing down operations.

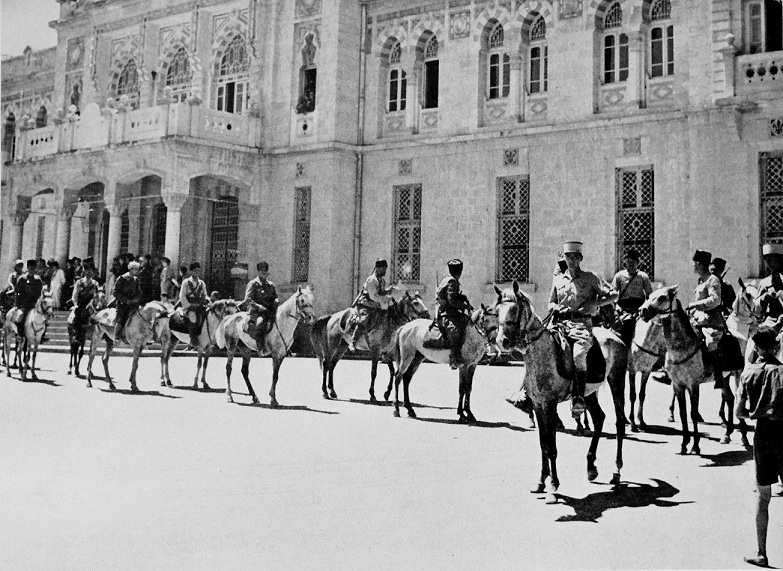
Colonel Philibert Collet's Free French Circassian Cavalry outside the railway station at Damascus, in the aftermath of the Syria-Lebanon campaign, 26 June 1941.

Movements over 30 kilometres (19 miles) (the daily horse travel limit) were particularly slow and complex. Longer hauls were relegated to trucks at the first opportunity, while horses persisted at divisional level and in auxiliary units. Horse transports were particularly inadequate in deep offensive operations, just like they were in 1914. American trucks supplied to the Soviets allowed operations up to 350 kilometres (220 miles) away from the railhead, a distance impossible for horse-drawn sleighs. Likewise, replacement of field artillery horses with jeeps allowed towing 120 mm mortars in line with advancing troops, another tactic not possible with horses. Use of trucks was constrained by the lack of fuel and high costs of synthetic gasoline on the German side, and the losses of equipment in 1941–1942 on the Soviet side. The Soviets managed their losses with the formation of 76 horse transport battalions of 500 horses each, and employed reindeer in the Arctic and camels in the South. But overcoming the shortage of horses themselves was insurmountable: a work horse matures in three to four years; farm stocks were already depleted of horses as well as tractors. Western European nations, starting with the United Kingdom, witnessed a shortage of horses since the 1920s and adjusted their armies accordingly. Germany in the 1920s managed to restore their population of horses, but then it declined again as farm horses were replaced by motor power.

The United States Army, having ample reserves of fuel and trucks, opted for all-truck logistics from the onset of their military reform of 1940. As General Robert W. Grow wrote, "there was not a single horse in the American Army in Europe, there was lots of cavalry action". Nevertheless, horses, mules, donkeys and even oxen remained essential in rough, remote areas of the Pacific.

== Belligerent armies ==
	France	Germany	Hungary	Italy	Japan	Poland	Romania	Soviet Union	United Kingdom	United States
National stock of horses	2.9 million (1930)	...	860,000 (1930)	942,000 (1930)	...	...	...	21 million (1940)	1.2 million (1930)	14 million (1940)
Horses employed by the military	>520,000 (1939)	2.75 million	30 thousand	...	100,000	152,000	90,000	3.5 million	...	52,000
Maximum number of cavalry units deployed	...	6 divisions (February 1945)	2 divisions (1944)	...	25 regiments (1940)	38 regiments (1939)	6 divisions (1942)	80 light cavalry divisions (December 1941)	...	13 regiments (1939) (Note: Reformed into armored forces in 1940–1941.)
Largest cavalry formation deployed	Corps	Corps	Division	Division	Brigade	Brigade	Division	Group (Army equivalent)	...	Division
Main role(s) of horse elements in the military	Mobile troops	Field logistics	Mobile troops	Mobile and colonial troops	Mobile troops	Mobile troops	Mobile troops	Mobile troops, logistics	Logistics, colonial troops	Logistics in the Pacific Theater

=== China ===
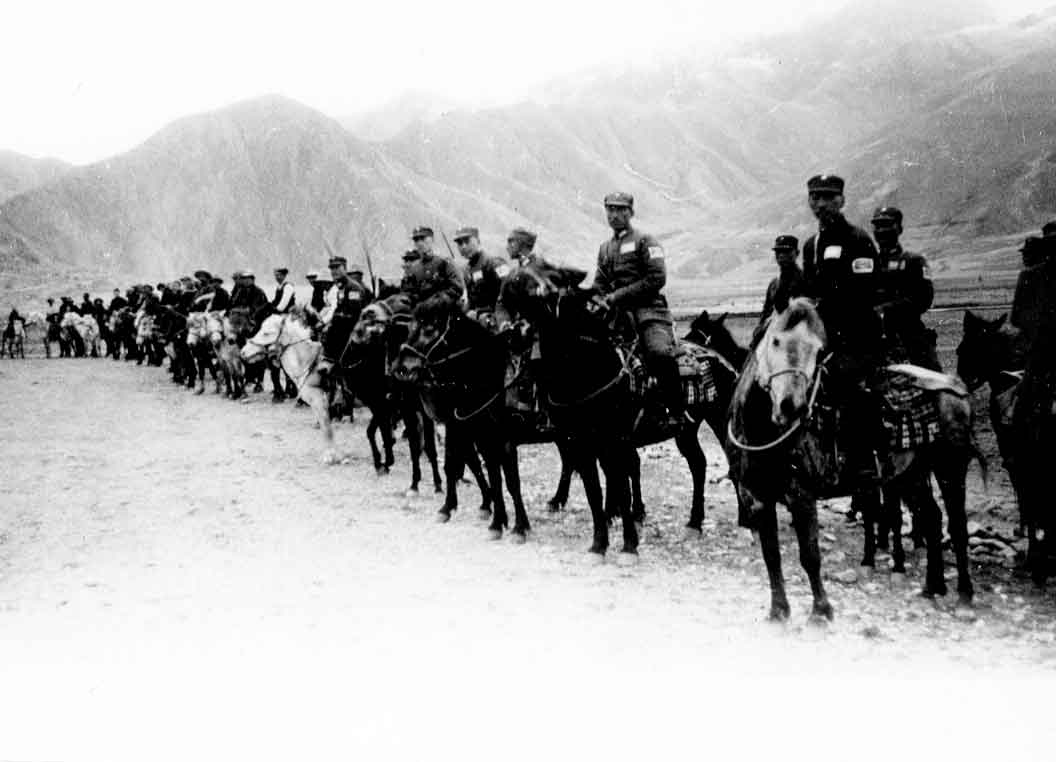
Chinese cavalry during WWII

Cavalry provided a major element in the Chinese armies of 1937–1945. Both the National Army of the Kuomintang and the Chinese Communist Party Army used cavalry for patrolling, reconnaissance and direct conflict as mounted infantry with the Japanese forces. Mongolian horses provided the bulk of horse-stock in Chinese armies with larger Ningxia ponies sometimes used. As late as the 1940s the Chinese People's Liberation Army included approximately 100,000 mounted soldiers, grouped in 14 cavalry divisions and considered as an elite.

=== France ===
Pre-war permutations of mixed horse-and-truck divisions resulted in the 1939 Light Cavalry Division (DLC). Each DLC retained a horse brigade of 1,200 sabers. At the onset of World War II France mobilized over half a million horses, arguably draining the resources that should rather have been invested into true mechanized and tank formations. The German offensive in May 1940 compelled the French to reconsider the effectiveness of their light cavalry and move it to what seemed to be a more appropriate ground, the Ardennes. But there too they were soon crushed by the decisive German offensive.

Several mounted regiments of North African spahis and Circassian cavalry formed part of the Vichy controlled Army of the Levant in 1941, where they saw action during the occupation of Syria and Lebanon by British Empire and Free French forces.

By 1945 the only French mounted troops retaining an operational role were several squadrons of Moroccan and Algerian spahis serving in North Africa and in France itself.

=== Germany ===
The German Army entered World War II with 514,000 horses, and over the course of the war employed, in total, 2.75 million horses and mules; the average number of horses in the Army reached 1.1 million.

==== Logistics ====
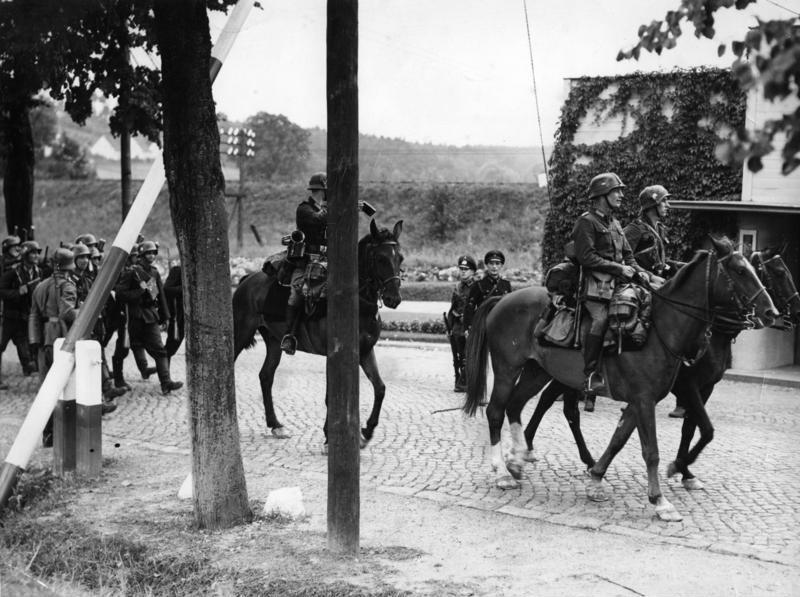
German horsemen cross the Polish border, 1939

Most of these horses were employed by foot infantry and horse-drawn artillery troops that formed the bulk of the German Army throughout the war. Of 264 divisions active in November 1944, only 42 were armored or mechanized (November 1943: 52 of 322). In addition to work horses each infantry division possessed a reconnaissance battalion with 216 cavalrymen – the legacy of disbanded cavalry regiments. They wore cavalry insignia until September 1943. Over the course of the war these horse elements were reduced, and the 1945 divisions lacked horsemen altogether. Reconnaissance and antitank battalions were the only mobile elements in a German infantry division.

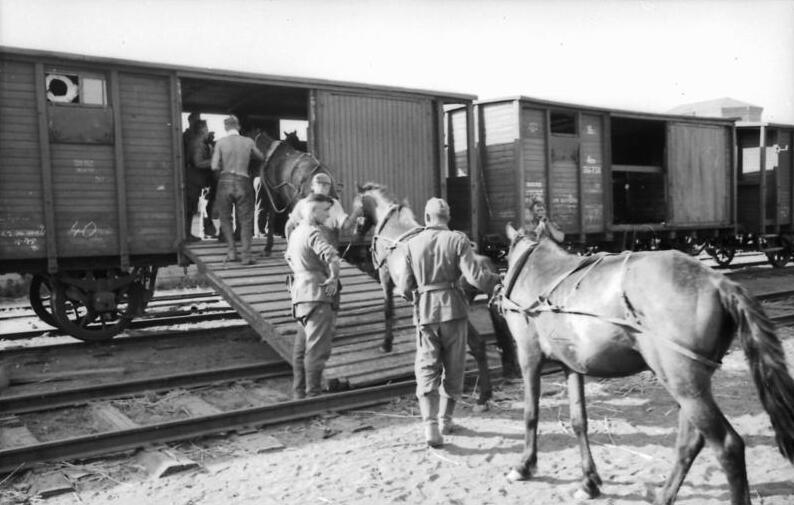
German soldiers load horses onto boxcar, southern Russia

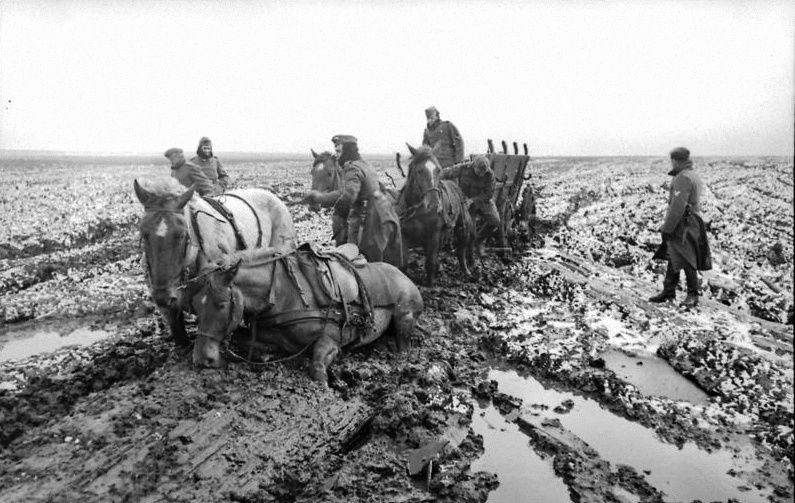
German horses stuck in Rasputitsa

The organization of infantry troops and the mindset of their commanders were radically different from those of advance panzer forces. Mechanization of the German Army substantially lagged behind the Red Army, although the blitzkrieg of 1941 temporarily reversed the tables: the Germans captured tanks, trucks and tractors but were losing horses: 179,000 died in December 1941 and January 1942 alone. A German soldier wrote: "A curious odor will stick to this campaign, this mixture of fire, sweat and horse corpses."

A German division was supposed to be logistically self-sufficient, providing its own men, horses and equipment to haul its own supplies from an Army level railhead. Soviet divisions, on the contrary, relied on the Army level transports. The supply train of a 1943 German infantry division employed 256 trucks and 2,652 horses attended by 4,047 men, while other divisional configurations had up to 6,300 horses. The supply train of a lean 1943 Soviet infantry division, in comparison, had only 91 trucks and 556 horses attended by 879 men. (Note: All numbers are nominal headcount, rarely reached even during formation in deep rear areas.) Luftwaffe Field Divisions were designed to be lean and rely on trucks and halftracks but in real life these were substituted with horses and mules. Incidentally, psychotherapist Ernst Göring, nephew of Luftwaffe chief Hermann Göring, used therapeutic horseback riding to rehabilitate wounded pilots, but in 1942 the program was shut down as too expensive.

Horse logistics slowed down the German advance. The 6th Army, engaged in urban warfare in Stalingrad, was unable to feed or graze their horses and sent them to the rear. When the Soviets enveloped the 6th Army in November 1942, the German troops were cut off from their horse transport and would have been unable to move their artillery had they tried to evacuate the city. In an earlier envelopment, the Demyansk Pocket, 20,000 horses were trapped together with 95,000 men and airlifting fodder drained precious air transport capacity. However these horses also provided food for soldiers in an environment where the "axe rebounds as a stone from a frozen horse corpse."

==== Cavalry troops ====
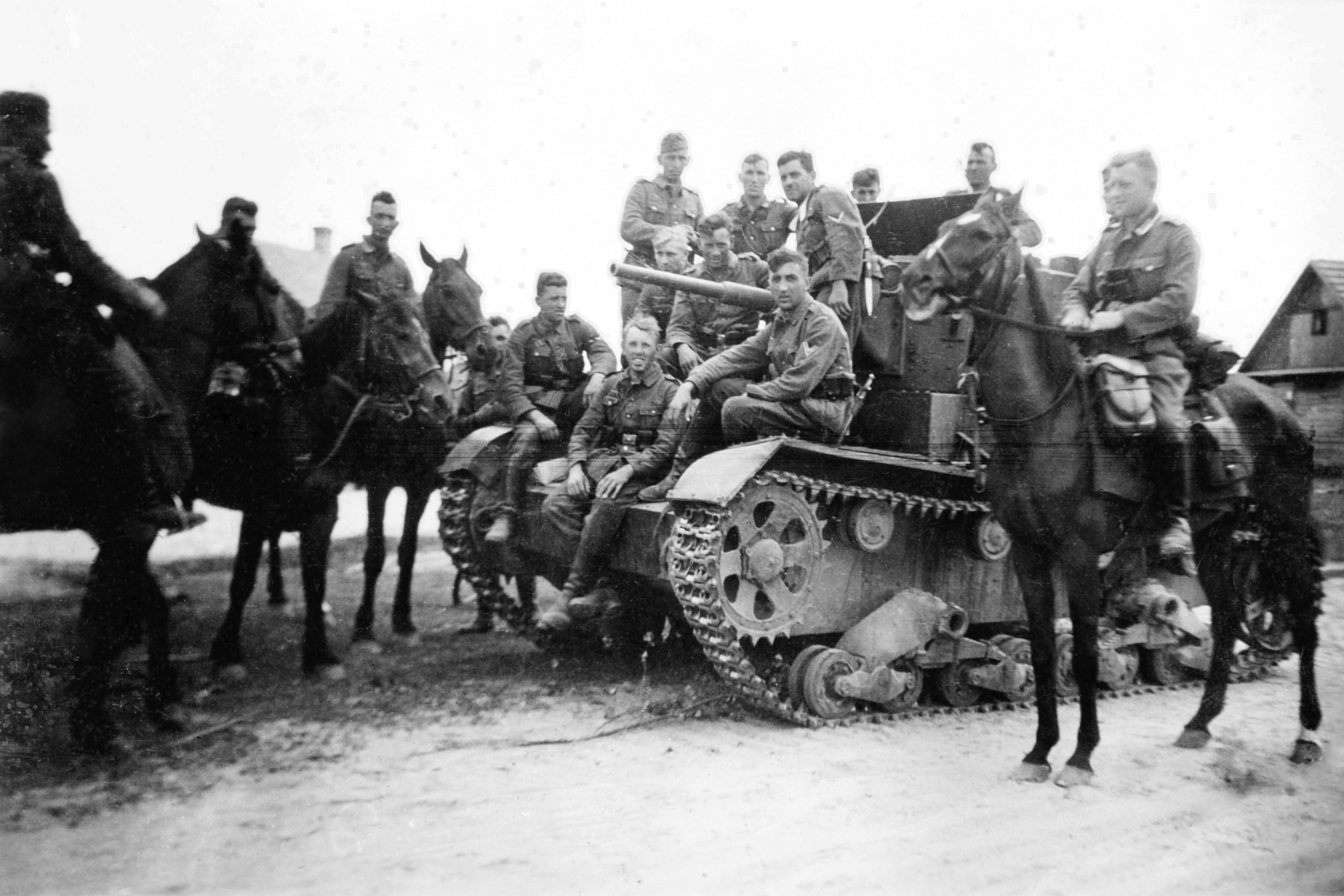
German cavalry with a captured Soviet T-26 light tank, 1944.

During the war German cavalry units increased in numbers from a single brigade to a larger but still limited force of six cavalry divisions and two corps HQ. All regular cavalry troops served on the Eastern Front and the Balkans and a few Cossack battalions served on the Western Front.

German and Polish mounted troops fought one of the last significant cavalry vs cavalry clashes, during the Battle of Krasnobród in 1939.

The German Army of 1941 had a single cavalry division assigned to Heinz Guderian's panzer group. Continuously engaged against Soviet troops, it increased in size to six regiments and in the beginning of 1942 was reformed into the 24th Panzer Division that later perished in the Battle of Stalingrad. In April–June 1943 the Germans set up three separate cavalry regiments (Nord, Mitte, Süd) – horse units reinforced with tanks and halftrack-mounted infantry. In August 1944 these regiments were reformed into two brigades and a division forming, together with the Hungarian 1st Cavalry Division, Gustav Harteneck's Cavalry Corps that operated in Belorussia. In February 1945 the brigades were reformed into cavalry divisions (German stud farms in East Prussia were not affected by the Allied air raids that crippled German industry).

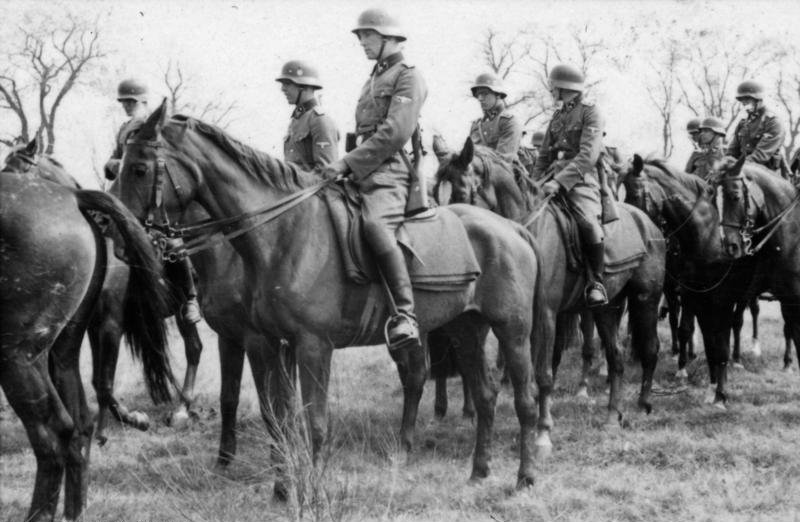
SS Cavalry Brigade in Russia, 1941

The SS operated both paramilitary horse units (23 cavalry regiments in 1941) and military Waffen SS cavalry. The SS Cavalry Brigade, formed in 1940, was engaged against civilians and partisans in the occupied territories and then severely checked by the Soviet Rzhev-Sychevka offensive. In 1942 the SS reformed the brigade into the 8th SS Cavalry Division manned by volksdeutsche, which operated on the Eastern Front until October 1943. In December 1943 the 8th Cavalry spun off the 22nd SS Cavalry Division manned with Hungarian Germans. These divisions were properly augmented with heavy, field and anti-aircraft artillery. Another SS cavalry division, the 33rd Cavalry, was formed in 1944 but never deployed to full strength.

The Germans recruited anti-Soviet cossacks since the beginning of Operation Barbarossa, although Hitler did not approve the practice until April 1942. Army Cossacks of 1942 formed four regiments and in August 1943 were merged into the 1st Cossack Cavalry Division (six regiments, up to 13,000 men) trained in Poland and deployed in Yugoslavia. In November 1944 the division was split in two and reformed into the XV SS Cossack Cavalry Corps. The Kalmyks formed the Kalmykian Cavalry Corps, employed in rear guard duties.

In February 1945 German and Hungarian cavalry divisions were thrown into the Lake Balaton offensive; after a limited success, German forces were ground down by the Soviet counteroffensive. Remnants of Army cavalry fell back into Austria; 22,000 men surrendered to the Western allies, bringing with them 16,000 horses. Remnants of SS cavalry, merged into the 37th SS Division, followed the same route.

=== Greece ===
Two Greek horse mounted regiments, plus one that had been partially motorized, saw service during the Italian invasion of Greece of October 1940. These units proved effective in the rough terrain of the Greco-Albanian border region

=== Hungary ===
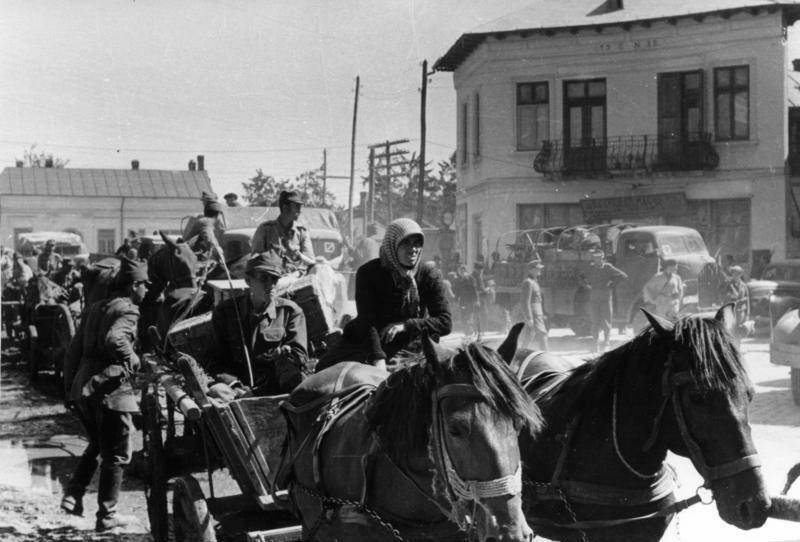
April 1944. Civilians and Romanian soldiers flee to Hungary from the advancing Red Army.

Hungary entered the war with two traditional horse-mounted cavalry brigades. Its war efforts were split between supporting Germany in the east and guarding the border with its hostile "ally" Romania. In 1941 the 1st Cavalry Brigade, part of the Mobile Corps, performed a 600-mile dash from Galicia to the Donetz Basin that ended in the loss of most of its motor vehicles. In October 1942 the Hungarian cavalry was reorganized into the 1st Cavalry Division, which in 1944 ended up defending Warsaw from the Soviets as part of Von Harteneck's Cavalry Corps. A second, reserve cavalry division was hastily formed in August 1944.

=== Italy ===
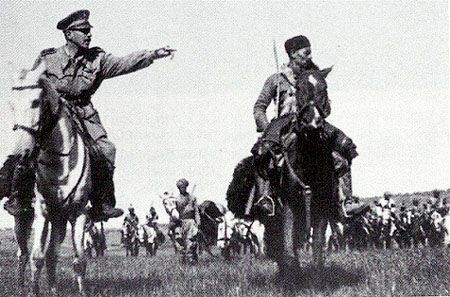
Lieutenant Amedeo Guillet with a Libyan Spahi and cavalry in the East African theatre

The Italian Colonial Empire inherited by the fascist regime maintained diverse colonial troops, including regular and irregular cavalry. Of 256,000 colonial troops available in 1940, 182,000 were recruited from indigenous North and East Africans. The mounted cavalry element amongst these comprised seven squadrons of savari and four groups of spahis from Libya plus 16 squadrons of Cavalleria Coloniale from Italian East Africa. On July 4, 1940, four East-African cavalry regiments and two colonial brigades captured Kassala at a cost of over one hundred men;.

Benito Mussolini's Italy entered the Russian Campaign in July–August 1941 by sending the CSIR, a mobile force of 60,900 men and 4,600 horses, to Ukraine. The CSIR retained traditional saber-wielding cavalry (The Savoia Cavalleria and Lancieri di Novara regiments of the 3rd Cavalry Division) and relied on horse transport and a motley assortment of civilian trucks. Despite high casualties, in 1942 Mussolini sent reinforcements – the 227,000-strong Eighth Army, renamed Armata Italiana in Russia ( ARMIR), primarily an infantry force. On August 24, 1942, when the Italian front was crumbling, Savoia Cavalleria charged the Red Army near Izbushensky and managed to repel two Soviet battalions. In December 1942 the Italians, outnumbered 9 to 1, were overrun and destroyed by the Soviet Operation Saturn.

=== Japan ===
Japan's environment, historically, did not foster horse breeding practices, thus after the Russo-Japanese War of 1904–1905 the government established a breeding bureau that imported Australian and English stallions, establishing a new local stock. After World War I the Japanese Army blended the majority of its cavalry regiments into 32 existing infantry divisions to provide mounted reconnaissance battalions. This wholesale integration created a perceived weakness in the Japanese order of battle which persisted into the late 1930s, although by 1938 four cavalry brigades had been set aside from the infantry for independent service in the wide Chinese hinterland. Contemporary observers wrote that by 1940 these brigades were obsolete, not fitting the role of a proper shock army. One Japanese cavalry unit saw active service outside China, in the Malayan campaign of 1941.

The Japanese also made use of Mongolian mounted auxiliaries, recruited in Japanese-held territory, to patrol the Soviet and Mongolian borders.

=== Mongolia ===
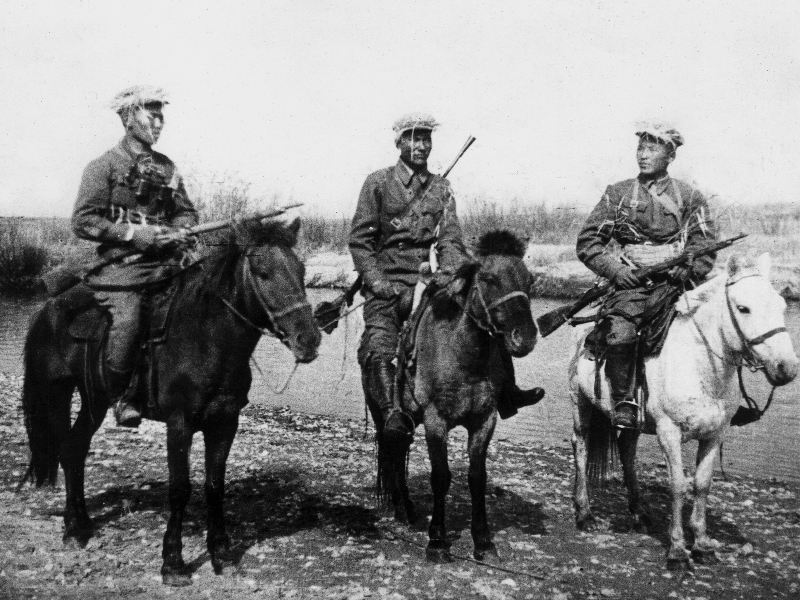
Mongolian cavalry in the Khalkhin Gol, 1939

In the early stages of World War II, mounted units of the Mongolian People's Army were involved in the Battle of Khalkhin Gol against invading Japanese forces. Soviet forces under the command of Georgy Zhukov, together with Mongolian forces, defeated the Japanese Sixth army and effectively ended the Soviet–Japanese Border Wars. After the Soviet–Japanese Neutrality Pact of 1941, Mongolia remained neutral throughout most of the war, but its geographical situation meant that the country served as a buffer between Japanese forces and the Soviet Union. In addition to keeping around 10% of the population under arms, Mongolia provided half a million trained horses for use by the Soviet Army. In addition, some mounted units of the Mongolian People's Army supported a Soviet Army on the western flank of the Manchurian Strategic Offensive Operation in 1945. They formed part of the Soviet Mongolian Cavalry Mechanized Group under the command of I. A. Pliyev

=== Poland ===
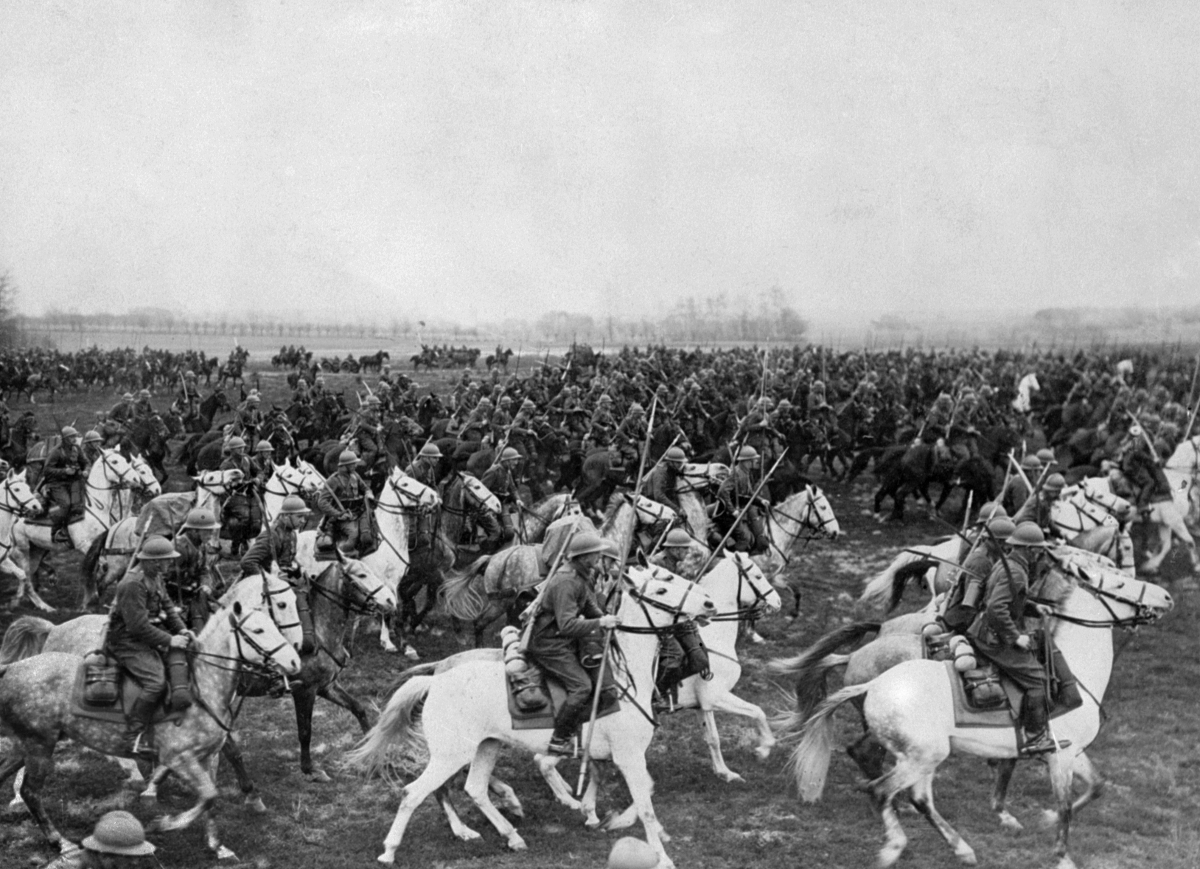
Polish cavalry maneuvers, late 1930s

The Polish Army and its tactics were influenced by the mobile Polish-Soviet War where cavalry was the decisive force. At the onset of war Poland fielded 38 cavalry regiments organized into 11 cavalry and 2 mechanized brigades (though only one, the 10th Motorized, was actually deployed). Cavalry accounted for around 10% of the whole Polish Army that remained, largely, an army of World War I. The government took the military threats seriously and counted on requisitioning privately owned horses. The stock of horses was regularly reviewed at local fairs, and best breeders rewarded.

The Polish campaign of September 1939 counted fifteen significant cavalry actions. Two were classic cavalry charges on horseback with sabres, others were fought on foot. The Poles claimed twelve victories, including successful breakout attempts. The most striking Battle of Mokra pitted the Wołyńska Cavalry Brigade headlong against the 4th Panzer Division with 295 tanks. The Poles repelled waves of tank and infantry attacks for two days, giving the Germans "a bloody drubbing".

The legendary charge of Polish cavalry against German panzers, however, was a propaganda myth influenced by the Charge at Krojanty. In this battle fought on September 1, 1939, the Polish 18th Cavalry Regiment charged and dispersed a German infantry unit. Soon afterwards the Poles themselves were gunned down by German armored vehicles and retreated with heavy casualties; the aftermath of the beating was fictitiously presented as a cavalry charge against tanks.

After the collapse of Poland the remains of its cavalry reemerged in France as the 10th Armoured Brigade and in the United Kingdom as the 1st Armoured Division. New Polish cavalry brigades were formed in the Soviet Union for the Polish Armed Forces in the East. The last action by Polish cavalry occurred on March 1, 1945 near Schoenfeld, when the Independent Warsaw Brigade overran German anti-tank positions.

=== Romania ===
The Romanian cavalry was the largest mounted force amongst Germany's allies. Romania began the war with six brigades and reformed them into divisions in 1942. A half-hearted modernisation introduced one motorised regiment in each division; prior to deployment in Southern Russia the 7th Cavalry Division was fully motorized. Four divisions were destroyed in the Battle of Stalingrad. Two divisions were trapped in Crimea and escaped the Crimean Offensive of 1944 with a loss of all hardware.

=== Soviet Union ===
==== Background ====
Collectivization of agriculture reduced Soviet horse stocks from an estimated 34 million in 1929 to 21 million in 1940. Of these, 11 million were lost to advancing German armies in 1941–1942. Unlike Germany, the Soviets had sufficient oil supplies but suffered from a shortage of horses throughout the war. Red Army logistics, aided with domestic oil and American truck supplies, were mechanized to a greater extent than the Wehrmacht, but the Soviets employed far more combat cavalry troops than the Germans. In total the Red Army employed 3.5 million horses.

The First Cavalry Army's experience and elevation of its commanders to the top of the military significantly influenced development of Soviet war doctrine in the interwar period. Although the cavalry armies were disbanded after the Russian Civil War, Red Cavalry reached 14 divisions and 7 independent brigades in 1929 and peaked at 32 divisions and two brigades in 1938, although few of them actually deployed to nominal strength. 1939 and 1940 were spent in massive reorganizations of the troops into mechanized and tank corps, their formation influenced by the Spanish Civil War and the Battle of France and their disbandment forced by the inability to properly supply and manage large formations. The role of cavalry was unexpectedly boosted by the setbacks suffered by mechanized forces in 1939 in Poland and in 1939–1940 in Finland.

A standard Soviet 1941 rifle division of 14,483 men relied on horse logistics and had a supply train of 3,039 horses, half of the complement of the 1941 German infantry division. Various reorganizations made Soviet units smaller and leaner; the last divisional standard (December 1944), beefed up against the 1943 minimum, provided for only 1,196 horses for a regular division and 1,155 horses for a Guards division. By this time few divisions ever had more than half of their standard human complement, and their logistic capacities were downgraded accordingly.

==== Debacle of 1941 ====
In June 1941 the Red Army had four Cavalry Corps commands and thirteen Cavalry Divisions (seven of them in western military districts), as opposed to sixty-two Infantry Corps and twenty-nine Mechanized Corps. By the 1941 standard, each division counted 9,240 men – four cavalry regiments, one mechanized regiment of BT tanks and two artillery battalions; a 1941 cavalry corps had two divisions reinforced with more armor and artillery. In real life cavalry and infantry units were stripped of their tanks and trucks, being purely horse and foot troops with reduced mobility and firepower. Even the stripped-down divisions were too large to be effectively handled by their inexperienced commanders and were easily disorganized and destroyed by the Germans (for example, 60 to 80 percent of the 6th Cavalry Corps were destroyed on June 22 as they struggled to assemble in formation). Other cavalry units such as the Belov's 1st Guards Cavalry Corps and Dovator's 2nd Guards Cavalry Corps proved how under the leadership of a great commander cavalry could not only perform its given tasks but outperform many of the best mobile units.

By the end of 1941 organizational problems were solved by further reducing units into "light cavalry" divisions with a strength of roughly half of a "normal" cavalry division (3,447 men in three regiments). Losses of tanks and trucks in the summer of 1941 made these eighty divisions, combined into Cavalry Corps, "about the only mobile units left intact to the Soviets". These were used to attack en masse at critical points, ideally in cooperation with tanks but rarely with foot infantry. In defense, cavalry was useful in checking enemy advances at an early stage, attacking German flanks and quickly evading enemy reaction.

Cavalry actions of 1941 were poorly led and executed, with high casualties; the tactics improved when cavalry divisions were reinforced with mechanized infantry units and anti-aircraft artillery. These attachments, made permanent, elevated cavalry divisions to Cavalry Corps, first deployed en masse during the 1941–1942 winter offensive. Again, incompetent or indifferent commanders regularly threw their cavalry against fortified targets with heavy casualties. Combat losses and a severe winter reduced horse stocks to a point where 41 cavalry divisions were disbanded for the lack of horses. Horse stocks did not and could not recover and the remaining cavalry divisions, even when refit, never had a full complement of horses.

==== Consolidation ====
Joseph Stalin favored the idea of a reformed Cavalry Army which the military initially opposed, fearing its vulnerability to enemy tanks. The concept of integrating cavalry, infantry and tank divisions (the future Tank Army) emerged as the Cavalry mechanized group (CMG) in the fall of 1942. The 1942 CMG functioned like a true tank army, but its infantry rode on horses, not trucks. The number of cavalry divisions was further reduced to match the number of CMGs (later Tank Armies) and the available horse stock, to 26 divisions by the end of 1943. These divisions acquired their own light tanks and increased to 5,700 men each. Their horse elements, although vulnerable to enemy fire, were indispensable in being able to keep pace with a tank breakthrough before the enemy could restore their defences. Normally on the night before the offensive they concentrated in a jump-off area 12–15 kilometres (7.5–9.3 miles) from the front line, and charged past it together with the tanks as soon as the first wave had breached the enemy lines.

In 1943 the Red Army gained sufficient experience and materiel to deploy numerous Tank Armies. They became the main strike weapon and cavalry was relegated to auxiliary offensive tasks requiring all-terrain mobility – usually involving encirclement and mopping up of an enemy already shattered and split by tank forces. During the Voronezh Front operations in the Upper Don area under Golikov, Soviet cavalry struck out very successfully for Valuiki and under the pale winter sun on 19 January the horsemen in black capes and flying hoods charged down the hapless Italians, killing and wounding more than a thousand before the brief resistance by the fleeing, hungry and frostbitten men of the 5th Italian Infantry Division ended.

The 1944 Cavalry Corps, in turn, had up to 103 tanks and tank destroyers in addition to three Cavalry Divisions that once again were made lean and light and dependent on horse alone (4,700 men with 76 mm field guns and no armor). By the end of the war with Germany, Soviet cavalry returned to its pre-war nominal strength of seven cavalry corps, or one cavalry corps per each tank army. This made the cavalry the only military unit in the Red army to achieve 100% Guards status among all of its units. The CMGs of the period (one Tank Corps and one Cavalry Corps) were regularly weapons of choice in operations where terrain prohibited the use of fully deployed Tank Armies.

The last CMG action in the war took place in August 1945 during the invasion of Manchuria. General Issa Pliyev's CMG, marching to Peking across the Gobi Desert, was actually manned by Mongolian cavalrymen – four Mongolian cavalry divisions in addition to one Soviet cavalry division, plus five mechanized brigades with heavy tanks. They were opposed by the horsemen of Inner Mongolia who fell back without fighting.

=== United Kingdom and British Empire ===
Replacement of horses with armored cars in British cavalry began in 1928. Over the following eleven years all regular mounted regiments stationed in the United Kingdom, other than the Household Cavalry, were motorized, and their horses sold or allocated to other units. Mechanised cavalry regiments retained their traditional titles but were grouped with the Royal Tank Regiment as part of the Royal Armoured Corps established in April 1939.

British troops in the Mediterranean theatre of war continued the use of horses for transport and other support purposes. The horses used were from local as well as imported sources. As an example the Sherwood Foresters infantry regiment, relocated to Palestine in 1939, brought with them a thousand English horses. Two mounted cavalry regiments were already present in this region. Lack of vehicles delayed planned motorization of these troops well into 1941. In 1942 the British still employed 6,500 horses, 10,000 mules and 1,700 camels, and used local mules in Sicily and mainland Italy.

Empire troops, notably the Transjordan Frontier Force and the Arab Legion, remained horse-mounted. All 20 Indian cavalry regiments were mechanised between 1938 and November 1940. The last British mounted cavalry charge occurred on March 21, 1942, when a patrol of sowars of the Burma Frontier Force encountered Japanese infantry – initially mistaking them for Chinese troops – at Toungoo in central Burma. Led by Captain Arthur Sandeman of The Central India Horse (21st King George V's Own Horse), the BFF detachment charged and most were killed.

=== United States ===
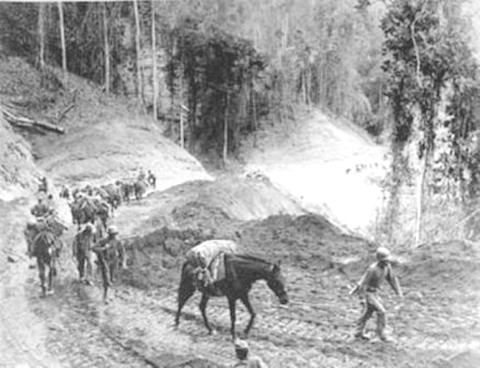
Burma, 1943 or later. Horse transport remained essential in remote, rough terrain even for the American troops (Merrill's Marauders pictured).

The United States economy of the interwar period quickly got rid of the obsolete horse; national horse stocks were reduced from 25 million in 1920 to 14 million in 1940.

In December 1939, the United States Cavalry consisted of two mechanized and twelve horse regiments of 790 horses each. Chief of Cavalry John K. Herr, a proponent of horse troops ("conservative and downright mossback" according to Allan Millett yet "noble and tragic in his loyalty to horse" according to Roman Jarymowycz), intended to increase them to 1275 horses each. A cavalry division included two brigades of two horse regiments each, eighteen light tanks and a field artillery regiment; the Chief of Artillery leaned to horse and truck traction and dismissed self-propelled artillery to avoid cross-coordination with other branches of service. Cavalry had been the preferred force for the defense of the Mexican border and the Panama Canal Zone from Mexican raiders and enemy landings, a threat that was becoming obsolete in the 1930s, if not for Japan's rising influence. A fleet of horse trailers called portees assisted cavalry in traversing the roads. Once mounted, cavalrymen would reach the battlefield on horseback, dismount and then fight on foot, essentially acting as mobile light infantry.

After the 1940 Louisiana Maneuvers cavalry units were gradually reformed into Armored Corps, starting with Adna R. Chaffee's 1st Armored Corps in July 1940. Another novelty introduced after the maneuvers, the Bantam 4×4 car, soon became known as the jeep and replaced the horse itself. Debates over the integration of armor and horse units continued through 1941 but the failure of these attempts "to marry horse with armor" was evident even to casual civilian observers. The office of Chief of Cavalry was eliminated in March 1942, and the newly formed ground forces began mechanization of the remaining horse units. The 1st Cavalry Division was reorganized as an infantry unit but retained its designation.

The only significant engagement of American horsemen in World War II was the defensive action of the Philippine Scouts (26th Cavalry Regiment). The Scouts challenged the Japanese invaders of Luzon, holding off two armoured and two infantry regiments during the invasion of the Philippines. They repelled a unit of tanks in Binalonan and successfully held ground for the Allied armies' retreat to Bataan. What would become, at that time, the very last combat horse cavalry charge in U.S. Army history occurred at Morong on the west side of Bataan, on January 16, 1942, when mostly Filipino troopers of 'G' Troop, 26th Cavalry (PS), led by Southern Illinois native 1st Lt. Edwin Ramsey, successfully charged their mounts at a far superior Japanese force of armor-supported infantry, surprising and scattering them. This lightly armed, 27-man force of U.S. Horse Cavalry, under heavy fire, held off the Japanese for several crucial hours. Ramsey earned a Silver Star and Purple Heart for this action, and the 26th was immortalized in U.S. Cavalry history.

In Europe, the American forces fielded only a few cavalry and supply units during the war. George S. Patton lamented their lack in North Africa and wrote that "had we possessed an American cavalry division with pack artillery in Tunisia and in Sicily, not a German would have escaped".

== Sources ==
- Mark Axworthy, illustrated by Horia Şerbănescu (1991). The Romanian Army of World War 2. Men At Arms 246. Osprey. ISBN 1-85532-169-6, ISBN 978-1-85532-169-4.
- J. Ingram Bryan (2006 reprint of 1928 edition). Japan from Within. Read Books. ISBN 1-4067-2732-6, ISBN 978-1-4067-2732-6.
- Geoffrey Cocks (1997). Psychotherapy in the Third Reich: the Göring Institute. Transaction Publishers. ISBN 1-56000-904-7, ISBN 978-1-56000-904-7
- Walter Scott Dunn (2005). The Soviet economy and the Red Army, 1930–1945. Greenwood Publishing Group. ISBN 0-275-94893-5, ISBN 978-0-275-94893-1.
- Stephen G. Fritz (1997). Frontsoldaten: The German Soldier in World War II. University Press of Kentucky. ISBN 0-8131-0943-4, ISBN 978-0-8131-0943-5.
- David Glantz (editor). The initial period of war on the Eastern Front, 22 June–August 1941: proceedings of the Fourth Art of War Symposium, Garmisch, October 1987. Taylor & Francis, 1997. ISBN 0-7146-4298-3, ISBN 978-0-7146-4298-7
- David Glantz (1991). Soviet military operational art: in pursuit of deep battle. Taylor & Francis. ISBN 0-7146-4077-8, ISBN 978-0-7146-4077-8
- David Glantz (2003). The Soviet strategic offensive in Manchuria, 1945: August storm. Routledge. ISBN 0-7146-5279-2, ISBN 978-0-7146-5279-5
- Bruce I. Gudmundsson (2004). On armor. The military profession. Greenwood Publishing Group. ISBN 0-275-95019-0, ISBN 978-0-275-95019-4.
- Jeffrey T. Fowler, illustrated by Mike Chappell (2001). Axis Cavalry in World War II. Men At Arms 361 Osprey. ISBN 1-84176-323-3, ISBN 978-1-84176-323-1.
- George Hoffmann (2006). Through mobility we conquer: the mechanization of U.S. Cavalry. University Press of Kentucky. ISBN 0-8131-2403-4, ISBN 978-0-8131-2403-2.
- German horse cavalry and transport. Intelligence Bulletin, March 1946.
- A. V. Isaev (2007, in Russian). Berlin 45-go (Берлин 45-го) Archived 2018-10-14 at the Wayback Machine. Yauza Eksmo. ISBN 978-5-699-20927-9.
- Ashley Jackson (2006). ‘’The British Empire and the Second World War.’’ Continuum International Publishing Group. ISBN 1-85285-417-0, ISBN 978-1-85285-417-1.
- Roman Johann Jarymowycz (2001). Tank tactics: from Normandy to Lorraine. Lynne Rienner Publishers. ISBN 1-55587-950-0, ISBN 978-1-55587-950-1.
- Roman Johann Jarymowycz (2008). Cavalry from Hoof to Track. Greenwood Publishing Group. ISBN 0-275-98726-4, ISBN 978-0-275-98726-8.
- Philip S. Jowett, illustrated by Stephen Andrew (2001). The Italian Army 1940–45: Africa 1940–43 Men At Arms 349. Osprey. ISBN 1-85532-865-8, ISBN 978-1-85532-865-5
- Darunas Liekis (2010). 1939 The Year That Changed Everything in Lithuania's History. Rodopi. ISBN 90-420-2762-2, ISBN 978-90-420-2762-6.
- Samuel W. Mitcham (2007). The German Defeat in the East, 1944–45. Stackpole Books. ISBN 0-8117-3371-8, ISBN 978-0-8117-3371-7.
- Allan R. Millett (1988). Military effectiveness, Volume 1. Routledge. ISBN 0-04-445054-0, ISBN 978-0-04-445054-2.
- Williamson Murray, Allan R. Millett (1998). Military innovation in the interwar period. Cambridge University Press. ISBN 0-521-63760-0, ISBN 978-0-521-63760-2
- Ciro Paoletti (2008). A military history of Italy. Greenwood Publishing Group. ISBN 0-275-98505-9, ISBN 978-0-275-98505-9.
- Edwin Ernest Rich, Charles Wilson (1967). The Cambridge economic history of Europe, Volume 1. CUP Archive, 1967.
- Kevin Conley Ruffner (1990). Luftwaffe Field Divisions 1941–45. Men At Arms 229. Osprey. ISBN 1-85532-100-9, ISBN 978-1-85532-100-7.
- Charles W. Sydnor (1997). Soldiers of destruction: the SS Death's Head Division, 1933–1945. Princeton University Press. ISBN 0-691-00853-1, ISBN 978-0-691-00853-0.
- Nigel Thomas, illustrated by Stephen Andrew (1999). The German Army, 1939–45 (4): Eastern Front, 1943–45. Men At Arms 330 Osprey. ISBN 1-85532-796-1, ISBN 978-1-85532-796-2
- Nigel Thomas, illustrated by Stephen Andrew (2000). The German Army 1939–45 (5): Western Front 1943–45. Men at Arms 336 Osprey. ISBN 1-85532-797-X, ISBN 978-1-85532-797-9
- Spencer Tucker and Priscilla Mary Roberts. (2004). Encyclopedia of World War II. Santa Barbara, California: ABC-Clio. ISBN 1-57607-999-6, ISBN 978-1-57607-999-7, OCLC 156793824.
- Max Werner (2006 reprint of 1940 edition). The Military Strength of the Powers. Read Books. ISBN 1-4067-9823-1, ISBN 978-1-4067-9823-4.
- Zaloga, Steven (1982). The Polish Army 1939–45. Men At Arms No. 117. illustrated by Richard Hook. Osprey Publishing. ISBN 978-0-85045-417-8.
