= Francesco De Martini =

Italian military officer (1903–1981)

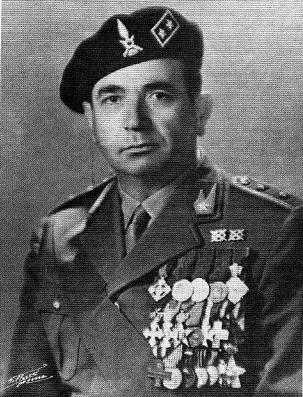
- Francesco de Martini in his first official photo as a Lieutenant Colonel of the Italian army in 1957.
- Born: 9 August 1903; Damascus, Ottoman Empire
- Died: 26 November 1981 (aged 78); Rome, Italy
- Military career
- Allegiance: Kingdom of Italy
- Branch: Royal Italian Army
- Rank: General
- Commands: XI Colonial Brigade
- Conflicts: Second Italo-Ethiopian War; Italian invasion of Albania; World War II; East African campaign; Italian guerrilla war in Ethiopia
- Awards: Gold Medal of Military Valor; Silver Medal of Military Valor; Bronze Medal of Military Valor

Francesco de Martini (Italian: [franˈtʃesko de marˈtiːni]; 9 August 1903 – 26 November 1981) was an Italian officer of the Military Information Service (Servizio Informazioni Militare, or SIM) in Eritrea, when the Allies invaded Italian East Africa during World War II. He enlisted as a private in the Royal Italian Army in 1923, and left active service as brigadier general and the most decorated soldier of the Royal Italian Army during World War II.

== Early life ==
De Martini was born in Damascus, which was then part of the Ottoman Empire, son of Antonio de Martini, an Italian engineer who worked at the construction of the never completed Berlin-Baghdad railway line and Sofia Mokadié. He accomplished his studies at the National College in Lebanon.

== Enlistment in the Italian army ==
In 1923, he was conscripted by the Italian army and sent to Rome to train in the newly created tank regiment.

In 1927 Prince Luigi Amedeo, Duke of the Abruzzi sent as a gift an Italian tank Fiat 3000 to Ras Tafari. De Martini had the task of delivering and training the Ethiopians in the use of it.

After defending with his tank Ras Tafari from a coup d'état organised by the followers of Empress Zewditu, he was appointed as commanding officer of the imperial guard.

On request of the Italian High Command, he spent 8 years in Addis Ababa, joining again the Italian army in Eritrea, just before the invasion of Ethiopia.

He fought in the Second Italo-Ethiopian War with the "Banda irregolare di Beilul", an irregular colonial band, and was awarded a silver medal for bravery on the field and promoted officer by war merit.

== Service in East Africa ==
As war with Ethiopia seemed inevitable, Francesco de Martini was tasked by Colonel Vittorio Ruggero to organize a military column, later called the "Dankal Column," made up of Yemeni mercenaries he had recruited in Beilul. During the war, he crossed the Danakil Desert and took control of Sardò in March 1936, the residence of the Sultan Mahammad Yayyo Ussa of Aussa. Subsequently, he went with one hundred men from Sardò toward the Awash River, where suspicious movements of armed groups had been reported, he and his detachment traveled approximately forty kilometers, surprised the enemy and defeated them, returning to Sardò that evening with fifteen prisoners and eight captured rifles. Francesco de Martini was then promoted to officer for "war merit".

After the fall of Addis Ababa, De Martini was assigned to Shewa as part of the XI Colonial Brigade to fight against the Ethiopian guerrillas and was awarded a bronze medal.

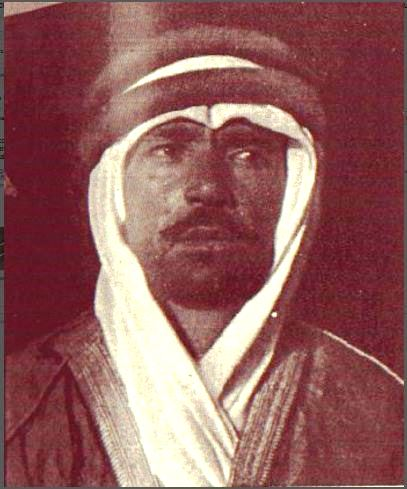
De Martini in 1942 Dahlak

In the first months of 1941, he fought in the East African Campaign in Assab and Dankalia (southern Eritrea), where he was captured when severely ill with malaria by a British patrol, but a week later he managed to escape from the hospital of the Dessié.

He decided, in accordance with his commander Colonel Alessandro Bruttini, to go to Saudi Arabia in order to report the situation to Rome through the Italian consulate in Jeddah.

Returning to Eritrea, on 1 August 1941, Lieutenant De Martini blew up a British ammunition dump in Massaua (Eritrea).

After crossing the Red Sea in the motorboat Zam Zam, De Martini fled to Saudi Arabia. He made contact with the Italian consulate in that country, and from the Yemeni coast organized a group of Eritrean sailors (with small boats called sambuco) in order to identify, and notify Rome with his radio, of the Royal Navy movements throughout the Red Sea.

Major Max Harari, head of British intelligence, offered a reward for his capture. On 1 August 1942, while attempting to come back to Eritrea, De Martini was captured on Dahlak Island by sailors from HMS Arpha and imprisoned in Sudan.

== After the war ==
De Martini returned to Italy on 19 January 1946 after almost four years in a British POW camp, and rejoined the SIM. His first task was to contact the Ethiopian Ambassador in Washington during a brief visit to Naples, with the purpose of reestablishing diplomatic relations between Italy and Ethiopia.

After the end of World War II, Lieutenant Francesco De Martini received the Gold Medal of Military Valour, was also awarded with "Ordine Militare d'Italia" and received a second promotion to captain for war merits. He died in Grottaferrata in 1981, aged 78.

== See also ==
- Rosa Dainelli
- Italian guerrilla war in Ethiopia

== Bibliography ==
- Cernuschi, Enrico (1994). "La resistenza sconosciuta. La guerra in A. O. dopo il 1941". Rivista Storica (in Italian). VII (10): 54–61.
- Rosselli, Alberto (2007). Storie Segrete. Operazioni sconosciute o dimenticate della seconda guerra mondiale. Pavia: Iuculano Editore. ISBN 978-8870727661.
- Ilari, Virgilio. "Francesco Di Martini. La resistenza italiana in AOI e il mancato appoggio all'insurrezione iraqena (1941)", in Virgilio Ilari (ed.), Italy on the Rimland. Storia militare di una Penisola eurasiatica. Vol. II. Rome. Società Italiana di Storia Militare-Nadir Media. 2019. pp. 225–234.
