= Bands (Italian Army irregulars) =

Native forces used in Italian colonies

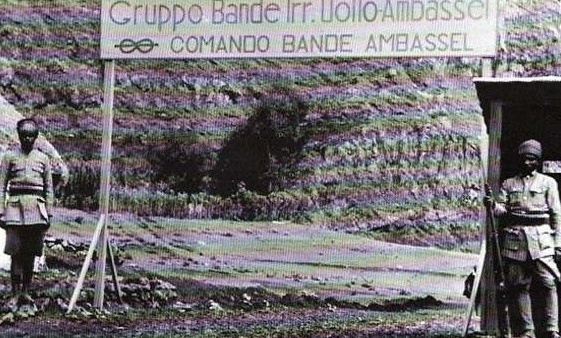
"Bande Ambassel" of Italian Army irregulars in 1939 Ethiopia

Bands (Italian: Bande) was an Italian military term for irregular forces, composed of natives, with Italian officers and NCOs in command. These units were employed by the Italian Army as auxiliaries to the regular national and colonial military forces. They were also known to the British colonial forces as "armed Bands".

== Characteristics ==
A Banda (singular) was approximatively company sized with 100 - 200 men. An individual member of a "band" was called a "Gregario". The larger unit was the battalion size Gruppo Bande (infantry) or Gruppo Squadroni (cavalry). The Milizia a regimental unit appeared briefly during the fascist period in the Balkans. The first of these irregular units employed by the Regio Esercito originated from a mercenary Arab force employed by the Ottoman Empire, called Bashi-bazouk (which became "basci buzuk" in Italian), that was created in Eritrea by the Albanian adventurer Sagiak Hassan in the second half of the 19th century. In 1885, the Italian Colonel Tancredi Saletta, commanding officer of the first Italian troops involved in the conquest of Eritrea, enlisted Bashi-bazouks in the service of Italy. As lightly armed irregulars the Banda were able to perform duties for which regular Italian and colonial troops were unsuited and at lower cost.

Locally recruited bands were employed in the conquest of Italian Libya from 1911 to the 1930s. Their Somali counterparts played an important role in Italian Somaliland during the 1920s. In "Somalia italiana", the Italians also employed Dubats; levies that were maintained on a permanent basis and were better trained and equipped than the Banda. During the guerrilla war that continued in Ethiopia after the 1936 Italian invasion, Bande were recruited amongst groups collaborating with the Italian regime. One of the best known of these was the Gruppo Bande irregolari "Uollo Ambassel" in northern Ethiopia.

While most Bande were recruited in the Italian colonies in Africa, many units bearing this designation were also created as auxiliaries during the Second World War in Albania and in the occupied territories of the former Kingdom of Yugoslavia. The other branches of the Italian armed forces and corps created Bande. The Banda n° 9 della Marina, formed of Serbs, Croats, Slovenes and local young Italians from Dalmatia, was established in Zara under the control of the Regia Marina (Italian Royal Navy). These naval auxiliaries fought side by side with a company from the Reggimento San Marco from 1941 to 1943.

After the fall of Asmara the group (reduced to just 176 soldiers) did guerrilla war for many months.

The Gruppo Bande Amahara has suffered 826 deaths and more than 600 injured from the beginning of WW2; it had no deserters and received the gold medal of hero Togni with enemy's congratulations, written on official reports of the British High Command (Il Gruppo Bande Amahara ha avuto 826 morti e più di 600 feriti dall’inizio della guerra, nessun disertore e la medaglia d’oro alla memoria dell’eroico Togni e gli ammirati elogi del nemico, nelle relazioni ufficiali dello Stato Maggiore Britannico.) Amedeo Guillet

== See also ==
- Amedeo Guillet
- Dubats
- Eritrean Ascari
- Hamid Idriss Awate
- Zaptié
- Savari
- Italian Spahis
- Royal Corps of Colonial Troops (Italian)
- Ruga-Ruga, irregular troops in Eastern Africa, often deployed by western colonial forces.
