= Rosa Dainelli =

Italian doctor (1901–1973)

Rosa Dainelli (2 May 1901 – 17 March 1973) was an Italian doctor and spy in the SIM from Cuveglio who was working in East Africa during World War II, when Allied forces liberated all of East Africa from Italian occupation in the Horn of Africa and returned it to the Ethiopian Empire. She subsequently participated in the Italian guerrilla war in Ethiopia against the Allies before returning to Italy.

== Historical background ==
Italian holdouts fought a guerrilla war in Ethiopia after the Allied victory at the Battle of Gondar in November 1941, which marked the end of the last regular Italian forces active in the field in East Africa. They fought in the hope of an Italian victory with the help of Rommel in Egypt and in the Mediterranean that would originate a possible return of the Axis powers in East Africa.

== Dainelli guerrilla action ==
Dainelli became an active member of the Fronte di Resistenza (Resistance Front), an Italian paramilitary organization which fought the Allies in the Italian guerrilla war in Ethiopia from December 1941 until the summer of 1943.

In August 1942 (some sources claim the date of attack was actually 15 September 1941.) she entered a British ammunition dump in Addis Ababa and blew it up, surviving the subsequent explosion. Dainelli was taken prisoner by the British shortly after. This act of sabotage destroyed the ammunition for the new British Sten submachine gun and delayed the deployment of this stopgap, extremely simple and cheaply made submachine gun that used regular 9×19mm Parabellum ammunition, for many months. Dainelli was famous as one of the few women who actively participated in the Italian guerrilla war in Ethiopia after the East African campaign.

After the successful sabotage she was quickly captured with her brother Giulio, and interrogated by the Allied authorities in Ethiopia before eventually being released.

She was the only Italian woman to be tortured in Africa and considered that she did not mention the names of the collaborators, they attempted psychological conditioning by forcing her to witness the torture inflicted on other Italians such as passing the current through their teeth. She didn't give in. She then underwent two months of segregation and another six in a security cell. Torture and harsh detention seriously affected her health so much that the British decided to transfer her to isolation in the concentration camp of Dire Daua from where, seven months later, in the summer of 1943, a little restored, she was repatriated on a white ship and hospitalized in Florence.

After the war, Dainelli moved to Switzerland in 1945, where she worked in Geneva at the International Labour Organization of the United Nations. She was nominated, after the end of the war, for the Italian iron medal of honour ("croce di ferro").

== See also ==
- Francesco De Martini
- Italian guerrilla war in Ethiopia

== Bibliography ==
- Cernuschi, Enrico. La resistenza sconosciuta in Africa Orientale (in Italian). Rivista Storica, dicembre 1994.(Rivista Italiana Difesa)
- O'Kelly, Sebastian. Amedeo - the true story of an Italian's war in Abyssinia 2002 Paperback ISBN 0-00-655247-1
- Rosselli, Alberto. Storie Segrete. Operazioni sconosciute o dimenticate della seconda guerra mondiale (in Italian). Iuculano Editore. Pavia, 2007
- Di Lalla Fabrizio, “Le italiane in Africa Orientale. Storie di donne in colonia” (in Italian). Solfanelli Editore, Chieti, 2014, pp. 93, 143.
- Di Lalla Fabrizio, “Sotto due bandiere. Lotta di liberazione etiopica e resistenza italiana in Africa Orientale” (in Italian). Solfanelli Editore, pp. 153,199, 234.
- Roncari, Giorgio. "Rosa Costanza Danieli. Una vita coraggiosa". Tra memoria e storia (Menta e Rosmarino). Treviso, 2017
