= Italian Spahis =

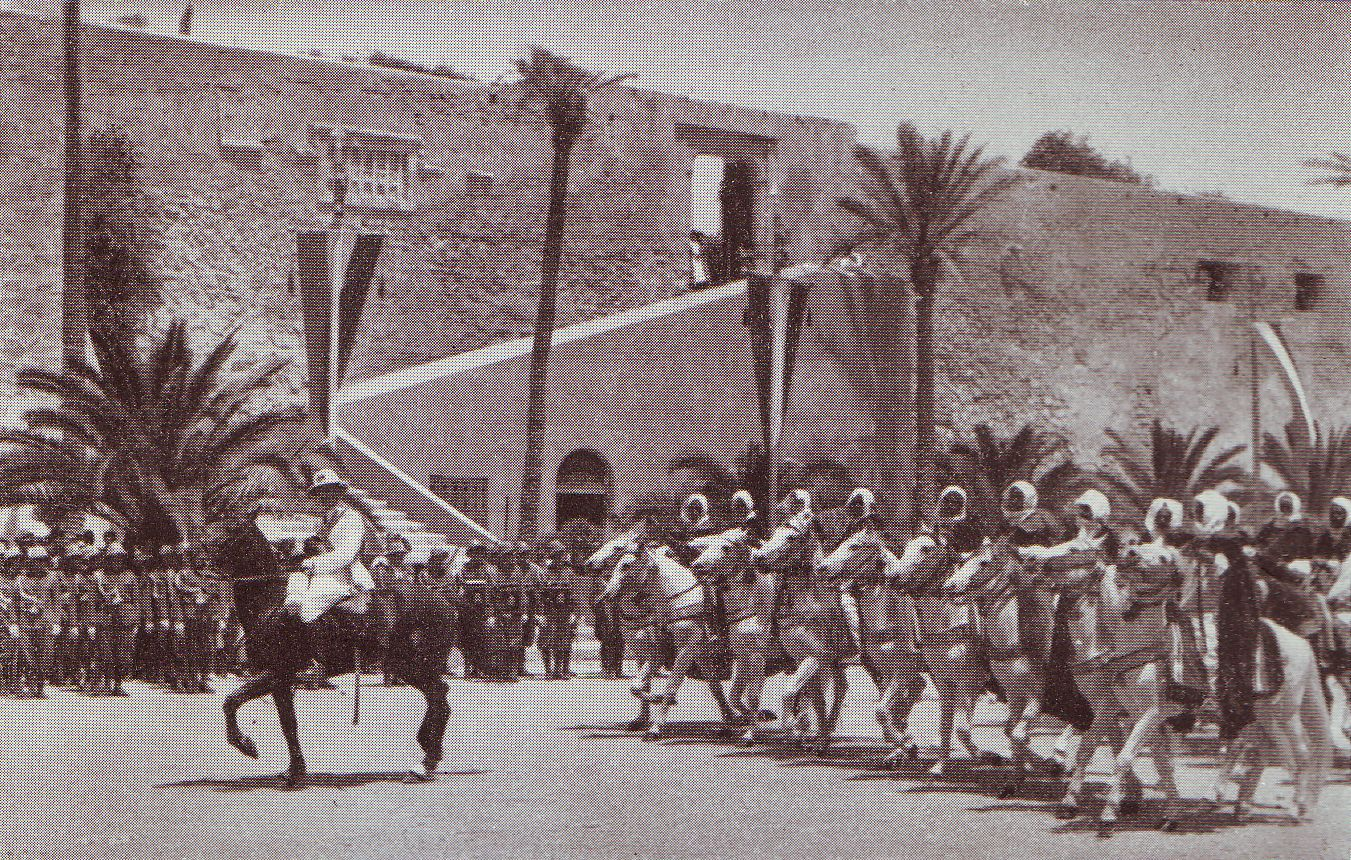
Spahis in Italian Libya, 1930s

Italian Spahis were light cavalry colonial troops of the Kingdom of Italy, raised in Italian Libya between 1912 and 1942.

== Characteristics ==
The Italian colonial administration of Libya raised squadrons of locally recruited Spahi cavalry immediately following the occupation of Libya, during the Italo-Turkish War of 1911–1912.

These differed from their French namesakes in that their prime role was that of mounted police, tasked with patrolling rural and desert areas, plus providing escorts and scouts. The name is the French form of the Ottoman word sipahi, a word originally derived from Middle Persian term Spah meaning "army", or "horsemen".

Although they had Italian officers these spahis were more loosely organised than the regular Libyan cavalry regiments (Savari). Newly enlisted spahis brought their own horses with them, in return for a government grant. The horse harness was obtained locally and was of Libyan design.

They usually wore a picturesque dress modelled on that of the desert tribesmen from whom they were recruited. After 1924 this consisted of a loose white coat, reaching to the ankles (parasia). The headdress was a white hood or smala worn over the low red-fez like cap (techia) worn by all Libyan units until 1942. This was completed by a dark blue burnous cloak, edged and embroidered in crimson braid.

== History ==
Initially raised as tribal irregulars in 1916–1919 to combat the Senussi resistance to the Italian annexation of coastal Libya, the Spahis were deployed along the Tunisian frontier in an effort to block the flow of weapons from French territory. Unlike their French Algerian and Moroccan counterparts (regular colonial cavalry also known as spahis) the Italian Spahis served as skirmishing auxiliaries armed with the light M1891 carbines of the Italian cavalry, but without sabres.

Following reorganisation in the 1920s, Italian Spahis formed part of the Regio Corpo Truppe Coloniali of Libya (Royal Corps of Libyan Colonial Troops), which included desert and camel troops, infantry battalions, artillery and cavalry. The Truppe Coloniali saw extensive service during the Italian conquest of Tripolitania and mainly contributed to the full control of Cyrenaica and Fezzan, which was not completed until 1932. Subsequently, they patrolled the border areas of Italian Libya. Throughout their history the Italian Spahis were recruited almost entirely from Tripolitania; an attempt in 1927–1929 to raise detachments in Cyrenaica to patrol the frontier with Egypt, proving unsuccessful because of a failure to obtain willing recruits.

In 1936, Spahis and other Libyan units took part in the Italian invasion of Ethiopia and received a "Gold Medal of Honor" for their distinguished performance in battle

=== Spahis of Amedeo Guillet ===
The Italian officer Amedeo Guillet commanded a "gruppo" of spahi irregular cavalry in Libya during 1934. The following year he and his Libyan spahis took part in the Invasion of Ethiopia.

== World War II ==
On the eve of Italy's entry into World War II the Royal Corps of Libyan Colonial Troops comprised approximately 28,000 locally recruited personnel, including nearly one thousand Spahis. In 1940-41 the existing four squadrons of Spahis were expanded to nine, organised in three Gruppo Squadroni (Groups of Squadrons).

The Libyan colonial infantry and artillery suffered heavy losses during the Battle of the Marmarica (December 1940) and were formally disbanded in January 1943 following the Italian withdrawal into Tunisia. The role of the Libyan Spahis and other horse mounted troops was limited mainly to patrol and scouting work by the demands of modern mechanized warfare. Spahi detachments were in control of Ghat and Ghadames until the first weeks of 1943.

== See also ==
- Italian Libya
- History of Libya as Italian colony
- Spahi
- Savari
- Dubats
- Zaptie

== Bibliography ==
- Antonicelli, Franco. Trent'anni di storia italiana 1915–1945. Mondadori. Torino, 1961.
- Crociani, Pietro. Le Uniformi Coloniali Libiche 1912–1942 La Roccia editore. Roma, 1980
