= Italian guerrilla war in Ethiopia =

1941–1943 theatre of World War II

- Part of the Mediterranean and Middle East theatre of the Second World War
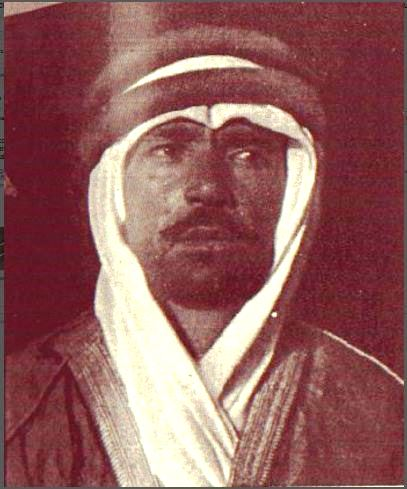
- Francesco de Martini
Date	27 November 1941 – October 1943
Location	East Africa
Result	Allied victory

Belligerents
United Kingdom; Ethiopia	Italy

Commanders and leaders
(United Kingdom) William Platt; (Ethiopian Empire) Haile Selassie	(Kingdom of Italy) Amedeo Guillet; (Kingdom of Italy) Francesco De Martini

Strength
	7,000 (including supporters)

The Italian guerrilla war in Ethiopia was a conflict fought from the summer of 1941 to the autumn of 1943 by remnants of Italian troops in Ethiopia and Somalia, in a short-lived attempt to re-establish Italian East Africa. The guerrilla campaign was fought following the Italian defeat in the East African campaign of the Second World War, while the war continued in Northern Africa and Europe.

== Background ==
By the time that Haile Selassie, the Emperor of Ethiopia, entered Addis Ababa in triumph in May 1941, the military defeat of Mussolini's forces in Ethiopia by the combined armies of Ethiopian partisans and Allied troops (mostly from the British Empire) was assured. When General Guglielmo Nasi surrendered with military honours the last troops of the Italian colonial army in East Africa at the Battle of Gondar in November 1941, many of his personnel decided to start a guerrilla war in the mountains and deserts of Ethiopia, Eritrea and Somalia. Nearly 7,000 Italian soldiers (according to the historian Alberto Rosselli) participated in the guerrilla campaign in the hope that the German–Italian army would win in Egypt (making the Mediterranean an Italian Mare Nostrum) and recapture the territories.

== Prelude ==
Two main Italian guerrilla organisations were formed, the Fronte di Resistenza (Front of Resistance) and the Figli d'Italia (Sons of Italy). The Fronte di Resistenza was a military organisation led by Colonello Claudio Lucchetti in the main cities of the former Italian East Africa. Its main activities were military sabotage and the collection of information about Allied troops to be sent to Italy. The Figli d'Italia organisation was formed in September 1941 by Blackshirts of the Milizia Volontaria per la Sicurezza Nazionale (a fascist organisation of volunteer soldiers). They engaged in guerrilla war against Allied troops and harassed Italian civilians and colonial soldiers (Askari) who had been called traitors for cooperating with the Allied and Ethiopian forces.

Other groups were the Gruppo Bande Amhara of Lieutenant Amedeo Guillet in Eritrea and the guerrilla group of Major Gobbi based at Dessie. From the beginning of 1942, there was a guerrilla group in Eritrea, under the command of Captain Aloisi, which was dedicated to helping Italians to escape from the British prisoner-of-war camps of Asmara and Decameré. In the first months of 1942 (because of the August 1940 Italian invasion of British Somaliland), there were also Italian guerrillas in British Somaliland.

While isolated, the guerrillas occasionally received support and encouragement from mainland Italy. On 9 May 1942, the Regia Aeronautica staged a long-range twenty-eight-hour Savoia-Marchetti SM.75 flight over Asmara, dropping propaganda leaflets telling Italian colonists that Rome had not forgotten them and would return. On May 23, 1943, two SM.75s made another long-range flight to attack the American airfield at Gura. One craft encountered fuel difficulties and instead bombed Port Sudan. Both aircraft hit their targets and returned to Rhodes, accomplishing a significant propaganda victory.

There were several Eritreans and Somalis (and even a few Ethiopians) who provided aid to the Italian guerrillas. Their numbers dwindled after the Axis defeat at the Second Battle of El Alamein in 1942.

These guerrilla units (Italian: Bande) operated in a very large area, from northern Eritrea to southern Somalia. They were quipped mainly with old Carcano "91" rifles, Beretta pistols, Fiat and Schwarzlose machine guns, hand grenades, dynamite and even some 65 mm guns but they were short of ammunition.

== Guerrilla war ==
From January 1942, many of these "Bande" operated under the command of General Muratori (commander of the fascist Milizia). He was able to encourage a revolt against the Allied forces by the Azebo Oromo people in northern Ethiopia, who had a history of rebellion. The revolt was put down by Allied forces operating with the Ethiopian army only at the beginning of 1943. During the Second Italo-Ethiopian War, the Oromo (called also "Galla") nobility sided with Italy hoping to exercise their power and taking advantage to return their lands. The Italian appointed them as governors of their former lands. In 1935, Raya Azeboos Oromos attacked the Abyssinian armies during the Battle of Maychew. Also, in early 1936, Oromos in Jimma expelled Amharas officials to defy the colonial rule. The Oromo nobility in western Ethiopia declared an independent Oromia state called "Western Oromo Confederation" (WOC) expressing a request for a mandatory state to the League of Nations. They obtained autonomy when the Italian Governorate of Eritrea was created in 1937. After the end of Italian rule in 1941 and Emperor Haile Selassie's return, the Oromos broadly contested Abyssinian rule and rebelled against the Shewa Amharan nobility, helped by General Muratori and instructed by his Italian Blackshirts. Such events were not mentioned in the Ethiopian historiography.

In the spring of 1942, even Haile Selassie I (who stated in his autobiography that "the Italians have always been the bane of the Ethiopian people") started to open diplomatic channels of communication with the Italian insurgents, allegedly because he was impressed by the victory of Rommel in Tobruk, Libya. Major Lucchetti declared (after the guerrilla war) that the Emperor, if the Axis had reached Ethiopia, was ready to accept an Italian protectorate with these conditions:

1. Amnesty for all the Ethiopians sentenced by Italy
2. the presence of Ethiopians at all levels of the administration
3. Participation of Emperor Haile Selassie in the government of the protectorate.

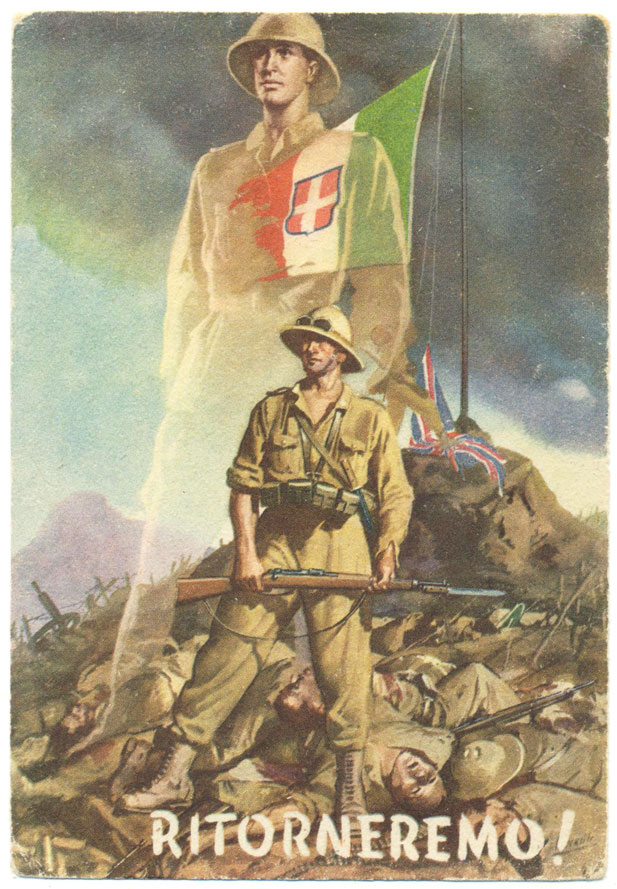
Italian propaganda poster calling for revenge after their losses in East Africa

In the summer of 1942, the most successful units were those led by Colonel Calderari in Somalia, Colonel Di Marco in the Ogaden, Colonel Ruglio amongst the Danakil and "Blackshirt centurion" De Varda in Ethiopia. Their ambushes prompted the Allies under William Platt with the British Military Mission to Ethiopia, to dispatch troops with aeroplanes and tanks from Kenya and Sudan to the guerrilla-ridden territories of the former Italian East Africa. That summer, the Allied authorities decided to intern the majority of the Italian population of coastal Somalia, to avoid them possibly contacting Japanese submarines. Italian guerrilla efforts declined following the Axis defeat at the Second Battle of El Alamein and the capture of Major Lucchetti (the head of the Fronte di Resistenza organisation).

The guerrilla war continued until the summer of 1943, when the remaining Italian soldiers started to destroy their arms and in some cases, escaped to Italy, like Lieutenant Amedeo Guillet, who reached Taranto on September 3, 1943. He requested from the Italian War Ministry an "aircraft loaded with equipment to be used for guerrilla attacks in Eritrea" but the Italian armistice a few days later ended his plan.

One of the last Italian soldiers to surrender to the Allied forces was Corrado Turchetti, who wrote in his memoirs that some soldiers continued to ambush Allied troops until October 1943. The last Italian officer known to have fought the guerrilla war was Colonel Nino Tramonti in Eritrea.

== Guerrilla leaders ==
Of the many Italians who performed guerrilla actions between December 1941 and September 1943, two are significant

- Francesco De Martini, captain of the Military Information Service (Servizio Informazioni Militare (SIM) who in January 1942 blew up a depot of captured Italian ammunition in Massawa, Eritrea and later organised a group of Eritrean sailors (with small boats called sambuco) to identify, and notify Rome with his radio, of Naval movements throughout the Red Sea until he was captured at Dahlak Kebir in August 1942. De Martini received the Italian Gold Medal of Military Valor.
- Rosa Dainelli, a doctor who in August 1942 succeeded in entering the main ammunition depot of the British Army in Addis Ababa and blowing it up, miraculously surviving the huge explosion. Doctor Dainelli was proposed for the Italian Iron Medal of Honor (croce di ferro). Some sources claim the date of the attack was actually 15 September 1941.

== See also ==
- List of British military equipment of World War II
- List of Second Italo-Ethiopian War weapons of Ethiopia – list of Ethiopian equipment of the time which would have been supplemented by captured Italian weapons
- List of Italian Army equipment in World War II

== Bibliography ==
- Archivio Segreto. Relazione Lucchetti. 2 Guerra Mondiale (Pacco IV) [Secret Archive. Lucchetti Report. World War II Part IV]. ASMAI/III [Analizziamo la Seconda Guerra Mondiale] (in Italian).
- Bullotta, Antonia (1949). La Somalia sotto due bandiere [Somalia under two flags]. Vita vissuta (in Italian). Edizioni Garzanti. OCLC 9422617.
- Cernuschi, Enrico (1994). "La resistenza sconosciuta. La guerra in A. O. dopo il 1941" [The Unknown Resistance. The war in A. O. after 1941]. Rivista Storica (in Italian). VII (10): 54–61. ISSN 0035-7073.
- Di Lalla, Fabrizio (2016). Sotto due bandiere. Lotta di liberazione etiopica e resistenza italiana in Africa Orientale [Under two flags. Ethiopian liberation struggle and Italian resistance in East Africa.] (in Italian). Chieti: Solfanelli Editore. ISBN 978-8-87-497932-5.
- Gebissa, Ezekiel (2002). "The Italian Invasion, the Ethiopian Empire, and Oromo Nationalism: The Significance of the Western Oromo Confederation of 1936". Northeast African Studies. 9 (3): 75–96. doi:10.1353/nas.2007.0011. ISSN 1535-6574. Archived from the original on 2025-04-24.
- Rosselli, Alberto (2007). Storie Segrete. Operazioni sconosciute o dimenticate della seconda guerra mondiale [Secret Stories. Unbeknownst or forgotten operations of the Second World War.] (in Italian). Pavia: Iuculano Editore. ISBN 978-8-87-072766-1.
- Sbiacchi, Alberto (April 1979). "Hailé Selassié and the Italians, 1941–43". African Studies Review. XXII (1). New Brunswick, NJ: African Studies Association: 25–42. doi:10.2307/523424. ISSN 1555-2462. JSTOR 523424. S2CID 143495345.
- Segre, Vittorio Dan (1993). La guerra privata del tenente Guillet [The private war of Lieutenant Guillet] (in Italian). Milano: Corbaccio Editore. ISBN 978-8-87-972026-7.
- Selassie, Haile (1997). My life and Ethiopia's progress, 1892–1937: The autobiography of Emperor Haile Sellassie I: Translated from the Amharic original. Vol. I. Translated by Ullendorff, Edward. Chicago, Ill: Research Associates School Times Publications. ISBN 978-0-94-839039-5.
