= Amedeo Guillet =

Italian army officer and diplomat (1909–2010)

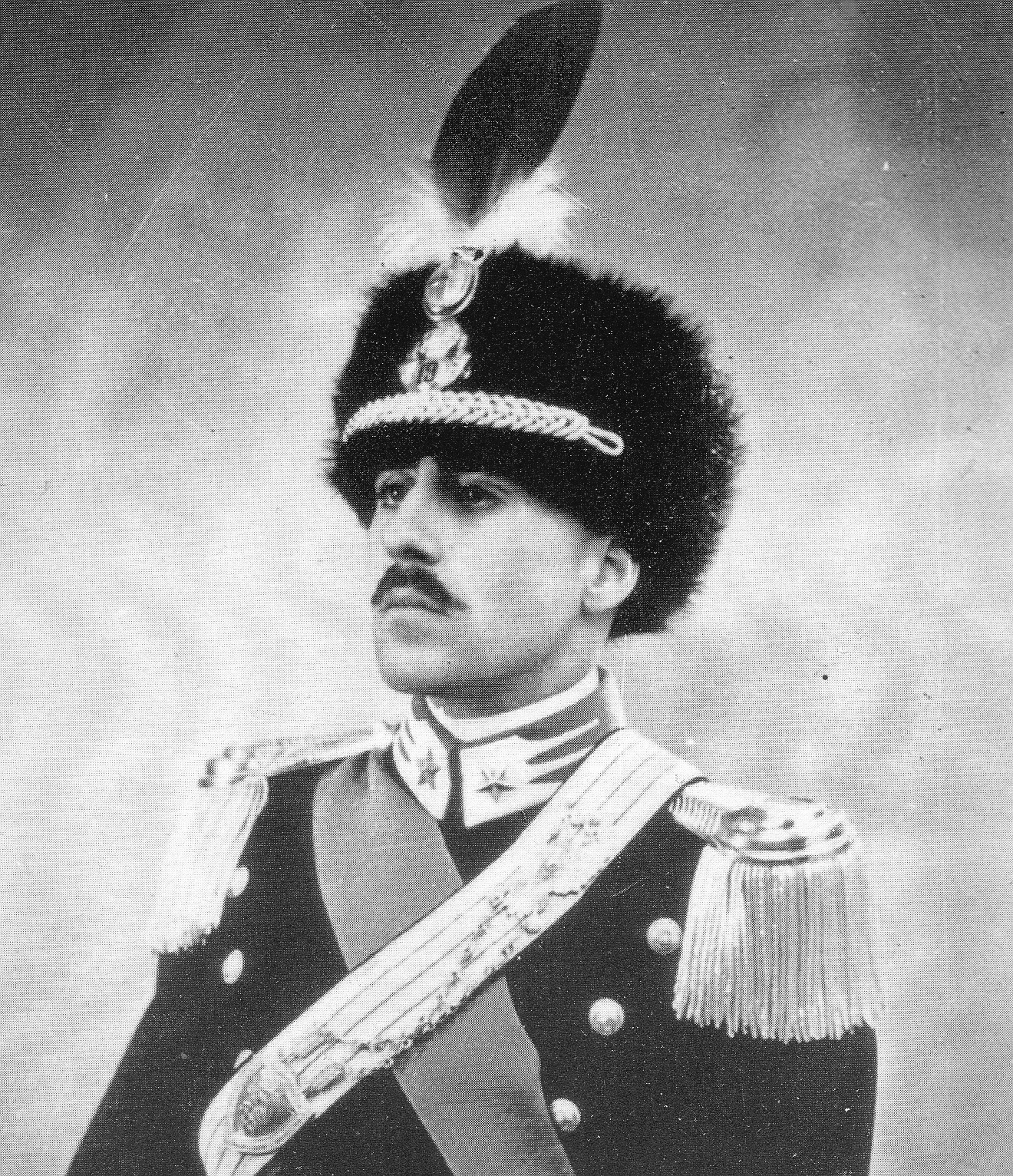
- Amedeo Guillet in 1935
- Nickname: Devil Commander
- Born: 7 February 1909; Piacenza, Kingdom of Italy
- Died: 16 June 2010 (aged 101) Rome, Italy
- Allegiance: Kingdom of Italy
- Branch: Royal Italian Army
- Service years: 1930–1945
- Rank: Colonel
- Conflicts: Second Italo-Abyssinian War; Spanish Civil War; World War II: East African Campaign; Italian guerrilla war in Ethiopia; Italian Campaign
- Awards: Knight Grand Cross of the Military Order of Italy

Baron Amedeo Guillet (7 February 1909 – 16 June 2010) was an officer of the Italian Army and an Italian Diplomat. Dying at the age of 101, he was one of the last men to have commanded cavalry in war. He was nicknamed Devil Commander and was famous during the Italian guerrilla war in Ethiopia in 1941, 1942 and 1943 because of his courage.

== Early life ==
He was born in Piacenza, Italy. Descended from a noble family from Piedmont and Capua. His parents were Franca Gandolfo and Baron Alfredo Guillet, a colonel in the Royal Carabinieri. Following his family tradition of military service, he enrolled in the Academy of Infantry and Cavalry of Modena at the age of 18, thus beginning his career in the Royal Italian Army.

He served in the Second Italo-Ethiopian War, which prevented him from competing in equestrian events in the Berlin 1936 Summer Olympics. Guillet was wounded and decorated for bravery as commander of an indigenous cavalry unit.

Guillet next fought in the Spanish Civil War serving with the 2nd CCNN Division "Fiamme Nere" at the Battle of Santander and the Battle of Teruel.

== World War II ==
In the buildup to World War II, Prince Amedeo, Duke of Aosta gave Guillet command of the 2,500-strong Gruppo Bande Amhara, made up of recruits from throughout Italian East Africa, with six European officers and Eritrean NCOs. The core was cavalry, but the force also included camel corps and mainly Yemeni infantry. For Guillet to be given command of such a force while still only a lieutenant was a singular honour.

In 1940, he was tasked to form a "Gruppo Bande a Cavallo". The "Bande a Cavallo" were native units commanded by Italian officers. Amedeo Guillet succeeded in recruiting thousands of Eritreans. His "Band", already named in the history books as "Gruppo Bande Guillet" or "Gruppo Bande Amahara a Cavallo", was distinguished for its absolute "fair play" with the local populations. Amedeo Guillet could boast of having never been betrayed, despite the fact that 5,000 Eritreans knew perfectly well who he was and where he lived. It was during this time, in the Horn of Africa that the legend of a group of Eritreans with excellent fighting qualities, commanded by a notorious "Devil Commander", was born.

The "Gruppo Bande Amahara" has suffered 826 deaths and more than 600 injured from the beginning of WW2; it had no deserters and received the gold medal in the memory of the heroic Togni, and high praise from our enemies, written in the official reports of the British High Command

Il Gruppo Bande Amahara ha avuto 826 morti e più di 600 feriti dall'inizio della guerra, nessun disertore e la medaglia d'oro alla memoria dell'eroico Togni e gli ammirati elogi del nemico, nelle relazioni ufficiali dello Stato Maggiore Britannico.

— Amedeo Guillet

Guillet's most important battle happened towards the end of January 1941 at Cherù when he attacked enemy armoured units. At the end of 1940, the Allied forces faced Guillet on the road to Amba Alagi, and specifically, in the proximity of Cherù. He had been entrusted, by Amedeo Duca d'Aosta, with the task of delaying the Allied advance from the north-west. The battles and skirmishes in which this young lieutenant was a protagonist (Guillet commanded an entire brigade, notwithstanding his low rank) are highlighted in the British bulletins of war. The "devilries" that he created from day to day, almost seen as a game, explains why the British called him not only "Knight from other times" but also the Italian "Lawrence of Arabia". Horse charges with unsheathed swords, guns, and incendiary grenades against the armoured troops had a daily cadence.

Official documents show that in January 1941 at Cherù "with the task of protecting the withdrawal of the battalions ... with skillful maneuver and intuition of a commander ... In an entire day of furious combats on foot and horseback, he charged many times while leading his units, assaulting the preponderant adversary (in number and means) soldiers of an enemy regiment, setting tanks on fire, reaching the flank of the enemy's artilleries ... although huge losses of men, ... Capt. Guillet, ... in a particularly difficult moment of this hard fight, guided with disregard of danger, an attack against enemy tanks with hand bombs and benzine bottles setting two on fire while a third managed to escape while in flames." In those months many proud Italians died, including many brave Eritreans who fought without fear for a king and a people whom they never saw or knew. To the end of his life, the "Devil Commander" used words of deep respect and admiration for that proud population to whom he felt indebted as a soldier, Italian, and man. He never failed to repeat that "the Eritreans are the Prussians of Africa without the defects of the Prussians". His actions served their intended purpose and saved the lives of thousands of Italians and Eritreans who withdrew into the territory better known as the Amba Alagi. At dawn, Gulliet charged against steel weapons with only swords, guns and hand bombs at a column of tanks. He passed unhurt through the British forces who were caught unaware. Amedeo then returned to the steps in order to recharge. In the meantime, the British artillery battery, under the command of Lieutenant Kenneth Simonds, succeeded in organizing themselves and firing at raised zero with their howitzers. The shells that actually exploded, and the extreme noise of the guns firing at point-blank range, successfully disrupted the cavalry attack and dispersed Guillet's troopers, ending the attack. He himself had his horse shot from underneath him by Lt Simonds' orderly with a Boys anti-tank rifle.

This action was the last cavalry charge that British forces ever faced, but it was not the final cavalry charge in Italian military history. A little more than a year later a friend of Guillet, Colonel Bettoni, launched the men and horses of the "Savoia Cavalry" against Soviet troops at Isbuchenskij.

Guillet's Eritrean troops paid a high price in terms of human losses. Approximately 800 died in little more than two years and, in March 1941, his forces found themselves stranded outside the Italian lines. Guillet, faithful until death to the oath to the House of Savoy, began a private war against the Allies. Hiding his uniform near an Italian farm, he set the region on fire at night for almost eight months. He was one of the most famous Italian "guerrilla officers" in Eritrea and northern Ethiopia during the Italian guerrilla war against the Allies occupation of the Italian East Africa.

Later (in early 1942) for security reasons he changed his name to Ahmed Abdallah Al Redai, studied the Koran and looked like an authentic Arab: so when British soldiers came to capture him, he fooled them with his new identity and escaped on two occasions. That's where he gained the nickname of "Devil Commander", as his men held that he seemed immortal.

After numerous adventures, including working as a water seller, Guillet was finally able to reach Yemen, where for about one year he trained soldiers and cavalrymen for Imam Yahya's army, whose son Ahmad became a close friend. Despite the opposition of the Yemenite royal house, he succeeded in embarking incognito on a Red Cross ship repatriating sick and injured Italians and finally returned to Italy a few days before the armistice in September 1943.

As soon as Guillet reached Italy he asked for gold sovereigns, men and weapons to aid Eritrean forces. The aid would be delivered by aeroplane and enable a guerrilla campaign to be staged. But with the Italy's surrender and the birth of the RSI, times had changed. Guilet was promoted to major for his war accomplishments and worked with Major Max Harari of the 8th King's Royal Irish Hussars who was the commander of the British special unit services that tried to capture Guillet in Italian East Africa. On 25 April 1945, he was entrusted as a secret agent with the mission to recover the crown of the Ethiopian negus from the "Garibaldi" partisan brigade, which had stolen it from the Social Republic. It was later given back to Emperor Haile Selassie. This was the first step towards reconciliation between Italy and Ethiopia.

At the end of the war, the Italian monarchy was abolished. Guillet expressed a deep desire to leave Italy. He informed King Umberto II of his intentions, but the King urged him to keep serving his country, whatever form its government might take. Concluding that he could not disobey his King's command, Guillet expressed his desire to teach anthropology at university.

== Later life ==
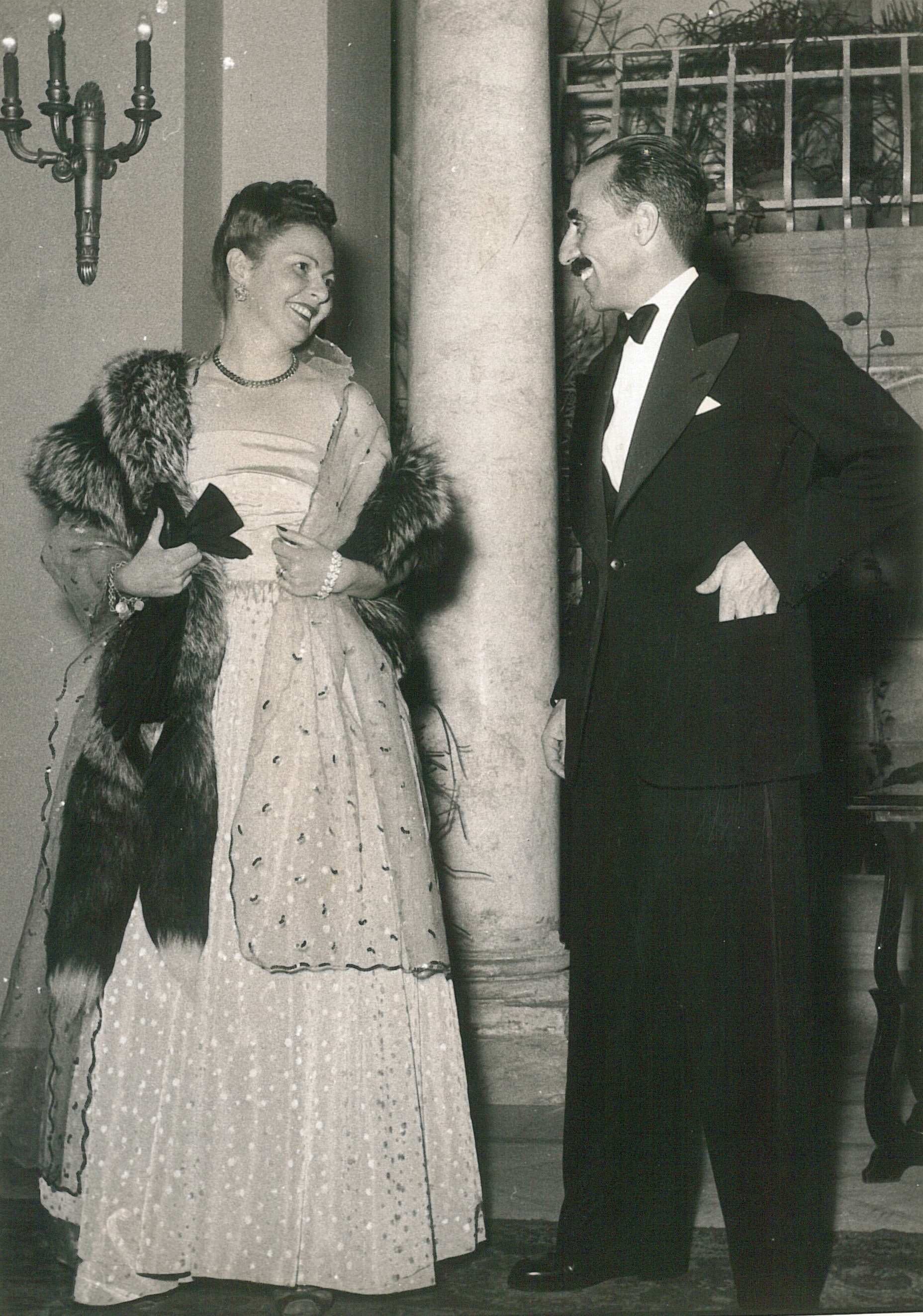
Amedeo Guillet and his wife at a reception in Cairo in 1953 (from "Immaginario diplomatico")

Following the war, Guillet entered the Italian diplomatic service where he represented Italy in Egypt, Yemen, Jordan, Morocco, and finally as ambassador to India until 1975. In 1971, he was in Morocco during an assassination attempt on the King.

On 20 June 2000, he was awarded honorary citizenship by the city of Capua, which he defined as "highly coveted".

On 4 November 2000, the day of the Festivity of the Armed Forces, Guillet was presented with the Knight Grand Cross of the Military Order of Italy by President Carlo Azeglio Ciampi. This is the highest military decoration in Italy. Guillet is one of the most highly decorated (both civil and military) people in Italian history. In 2001, Guillet visited Eritrea and was met by thousands of supporters. The group included men who previously served with him as horsemen in the Italian Cavalry known as Gruppo Bande a Cavallo. The Eritrean people remembered Guillet's efforts to help Eritrea remain independent of Ethiopia.

Since 1974, Guillet had been living in retirement in Kentstown, County Meath, Ireland although latterly he had spent his winters in Italy. For some years he was a member of and hunted with the Tara Harriers and the Meath Hounds.

In 2003, Amedeo reunited with one of his old wartime adversaries when he invited Lt Kenneth Simonds, the British officer who had faced his cavalry charge in command of an artillery battery, to his farm in County Meath. The two men were friends for the rest of their lives.

In 2009, his 100th birthday was celebrated with a special concert at the Palazzo Barberini in Rome.

Amedeo married Beatrice Gandolfo in 1944. The couple subsequently had two sons; Paolo and Alfredo. Beatrice died in 1990.

Amedeo Guillet died on 16 June 2010 in Rome.

== Documentary film ==
In 2007 Guillet's life story was the subject of a film made by Elisabetta Castana for RAI.

== Honors ==
Order of Merit of the Italian Republic 1st Class / Knight Grand Cross – 2 June 1975

== See also ==
- Italian Guerrilla war in East Africa
- Bands (Italian Army irregulars)
- East African Campaign (World War II)

== Bibliography ==
- Segre, Vittorio Dan (1993). La guerra privata del Tenente Guillet: la resistenza italiana in Eritrea durante la seconda guerra mondiale [The private war of Lieutenant Guillet: the Italian resistance in Eritrea during the Second World War]. Corbaccio Editore. ISBN 88-7972-026-0.
- O'Kelly, Sebastian (2002) Amedeo: The True Story of an Italian's War in Abyssinia, ISBN 0-00-655247-1
- Umiltà, Angelo; Barani, Giorgio & Bonati, Manlio (2004). Gli italiani in Africa: con appendici monografiche su esploratori e personaggi che calcarono il suolo africano dal 1800 al 1943 [The Italians in Africa]. T&M Associati Editore. ISBN 88-901220-5-6
- Scianna, Bastian Matteo (2019). "Forging an Italian hero? The late Commemoration of Amedeo Guillet (1909-2010)". European Review of History. 26 (3): 369-385. doi:10.1080/13507486.2018.1492520
