= Operation Appearance =

1941 British landing in Somalia in WWII

- Part of The East African campaign of the Second World War
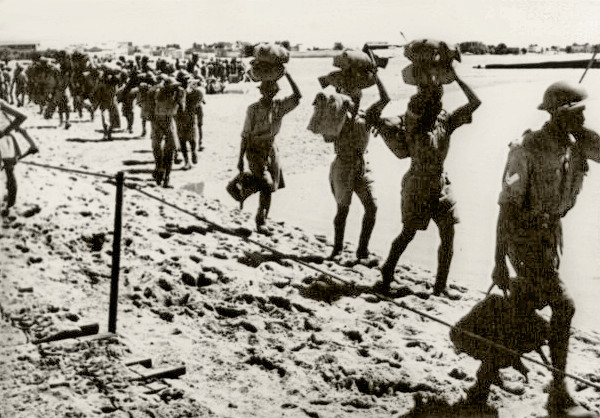
- Indian soldiers at the Recapture of Berbera, March 1941.
Date	16 March – 8 April 1941
Location	Somalia Governorate, Italian East Africa (Occupied British Somaliland) 09°33′N 44°04′E
Result	Allied victory
Territorial changes	Re-establishment of British Somaliland

Belligerents
United Kingdom; (British Raj) British India; South Africa; Somaliland	Italy; Italian East Africa

Commanders and leaders
Archibald Wavell; Ranald Reid	Prince Amedeo, Duke of Aosta; Arturo Bertello

Units involved
1st Punjab Regiment; 2nd Punjab Regiment; 11th African Division; 15th Punjab Regiment; Somali commando detachment 1401/1402 (Aden) Companies, Auxiliary Military Pioneer Corps Group	70th Colonial Infantry Brigade

Strength
2 battalions attached units 2 cruisers 2 destroyers 2 auxiliary cruisers 2 trawlers 2 transports	Colonial infantry brigade

Casualties and losses
1 killed 1 wounded	5,000 POW

Operation Appearance (16 March – 8 April 1941) was a British landing in the British Somaliland Protectorate against troops of the Italian Army. The Italian conquest of British Somaliland had taken place in August 1940, seven months earlier. The British had withdrawn from the protectorate after a delaying action at the Battle of Tug Argan. This withdrawal, after the disastrous conclusion of the Battle of France and the Italian declaration of war on 10 June 1940, had repercussions among British leaders. It led the Prime Minister, Winston Churchill, to lose confidence in General Archibald Wavell, the British commander in the Middle East, which culminated in Wavell's sacking on 20 June 1941.

British, Empire and Commonwealth forces from Britain, British India, Australia and South Africa in Aden trained for a prospective invasion of British Somaliland. The Far Eastern Fleet provided Force D, comprising two cruisers, two destroyers and a collection of adapted troop transports. To deceive the Italians in Ethiopia about British intentions in East Africa, Operation Camilla was leaked, suggesting that troop movements to Sudan were for an invasion of British Somaliland and that a diversionary operation would come from Kenya in the south. In Operation Canvas, the real invasion plan, Kenya was the base for the main invasion.

Force D and the Aden Striking Force conducted a beach landing at Berbera on 16 March 1941, taking the port by 10:00 a.m. The Italian garrison made a symbolic resistance and following their orders from the Duke of Aosta, withdrew into Ethiopia, most of their local troops deserting. In a few days, Berbera was developed to receive troops and supplies for the operations against Ethiopia, reducing the supply distance to the fighting front by 500 mi (800 km). A British military administration was imposed on the protectorate, the local police and the Somaliland Camel Corps were re-established, civilians were disarmed and the economy was revived.

== Background ==
=== Strategic situation, 1940 ===
On 10 June 1940, when Italy declared war on Britain and France, Italian military forces commanded by the viceroy and governor general of Africa Orientale Italiana (AOI, Italian East Africa), the Duke of Aosta became a threat to the British and French holds on their colonies in East Africa. Italian forces in Eritrea endangered British sea routes along the coast of East Africa, to the Red Sea and the Suez Canal. Anglo-Egyptian Sudan, French Somaliland, British Somaliland and Kenya Colony (British Kenya) were vulnerable to attacks from the AOI. The collapse in France and the Armistice of 22 June 1940 drastically weakened the British strategic position in the Middle East and East Africa. The closure of the Mediterranean to British sea traffic left only the 13,000 mi (21,000 km) voyage around Africa, to supply the British forces in the Middle East. On the eve of the Italian declaration of war, the Italian colonies in East Africa had 91,203 Italian members of the armed forces and police and 199,973 Eritrean, Ethiopian and Somali ascari. In July, the British had 47,000 men in British Kenya, Anglo-Egyptian Sudan and British Somaliland. (Note: Reinforcements later increased this to a peak of 254,000 men in East Africa.)

=== Italian invasion ===
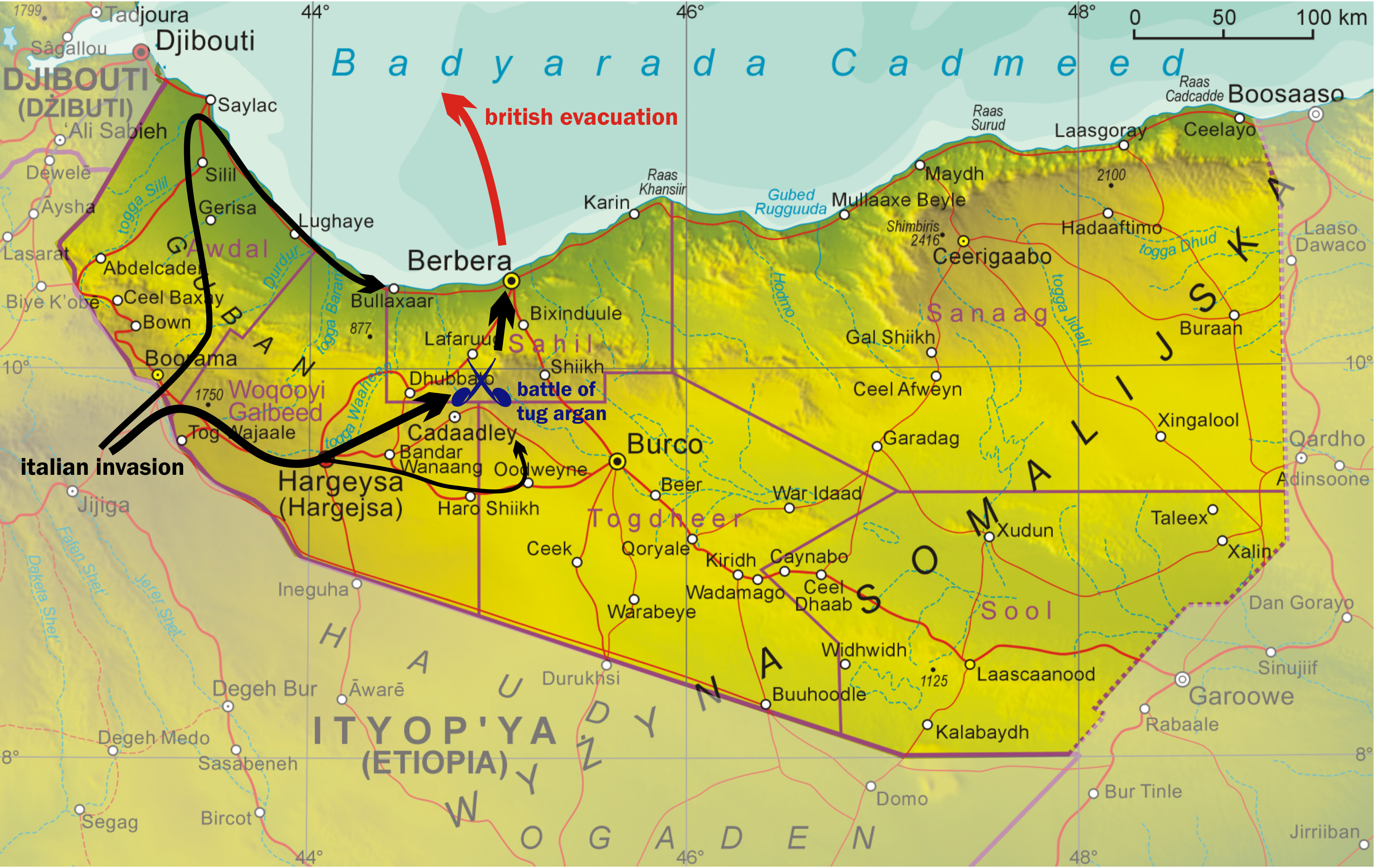
Map showing the Italian invasion of the British Somaliland Protectorate (3–19 August 1940) and adjacent territories of French Somaliland, Italian Ethiopia and Italian Somaliland

On 3 August 1940, British reconnaissance aircraft discovered that about 400 Italian troops had crossed the Ethiopian–British Somaliland frontier at Biyad, near Borama (Boorama). The Italian invasion force moved in three widely dispersed columns, co-ordinated by wireless and liaison aircraft. The main (central) Italian column advanced from the region of Harar in Italian Ethiopia, crossed the border south of Borama and reached Hargeisa on 5 August. The Somaliland Camel Corps skirmished with the Italians as they advanced and the central column attacked Hargeisa with infantry and light tanks covered by artillery and air attacks. A Rhodesian infantry company blocking the road retreated, after knocking out three light tanks, while the main British force slowly retired from the town. On the same day, the northern invasion column captured the port of Zeila (Saylac), not far from French Somaliland and then slowly advanced the 150 mi (240 km) down the coast road to Berbera, taking Bulhar (Bulaxaar), about 50 mi (80 km) from Berbera, on 17 August.

The main Italian force advanced in the centre from Hargeisa along the road to Berbera, only slightly delayed by road demolitions and improvised land mines. British troops in advanced positions were withdrawn on 10 August and the Battle of Tug Argan took place from 11 to 15 August. The Italians had achieved air superiority by 6 August and the defenders held the gap against Italian attacks for 72 hours, eventually running out of ammunition. Italian artillery superiority led to the defenders gradually being overwhelmed. By the time that the northern Italian column reached Bulhar, the defence of the Tug Argan gap had begun to collapse. Major-General Alfred Reade Godwin-Austen had been sent to command the forces in British Somaliland and on 14 August, judged that the situation at Tug Argan was irretrievable and was instructed by the General Officer Commanding-in-Chief Middle East Henry Maitland Wilson to withdraw from the protectorate (Wavell was in Britain). The garrison retreated to Berbera and by 2:00 p.m. 18 August, most of the contingent had been evacuated to Aden, with the HQ sailing in HMAS Hobart on the morning of 19 August; Italian forces entered Berbera that evening. The British suffered 38 men killed and 222 men wounded; the Italians 2,052 casualties.

=== Operation Camilla ===
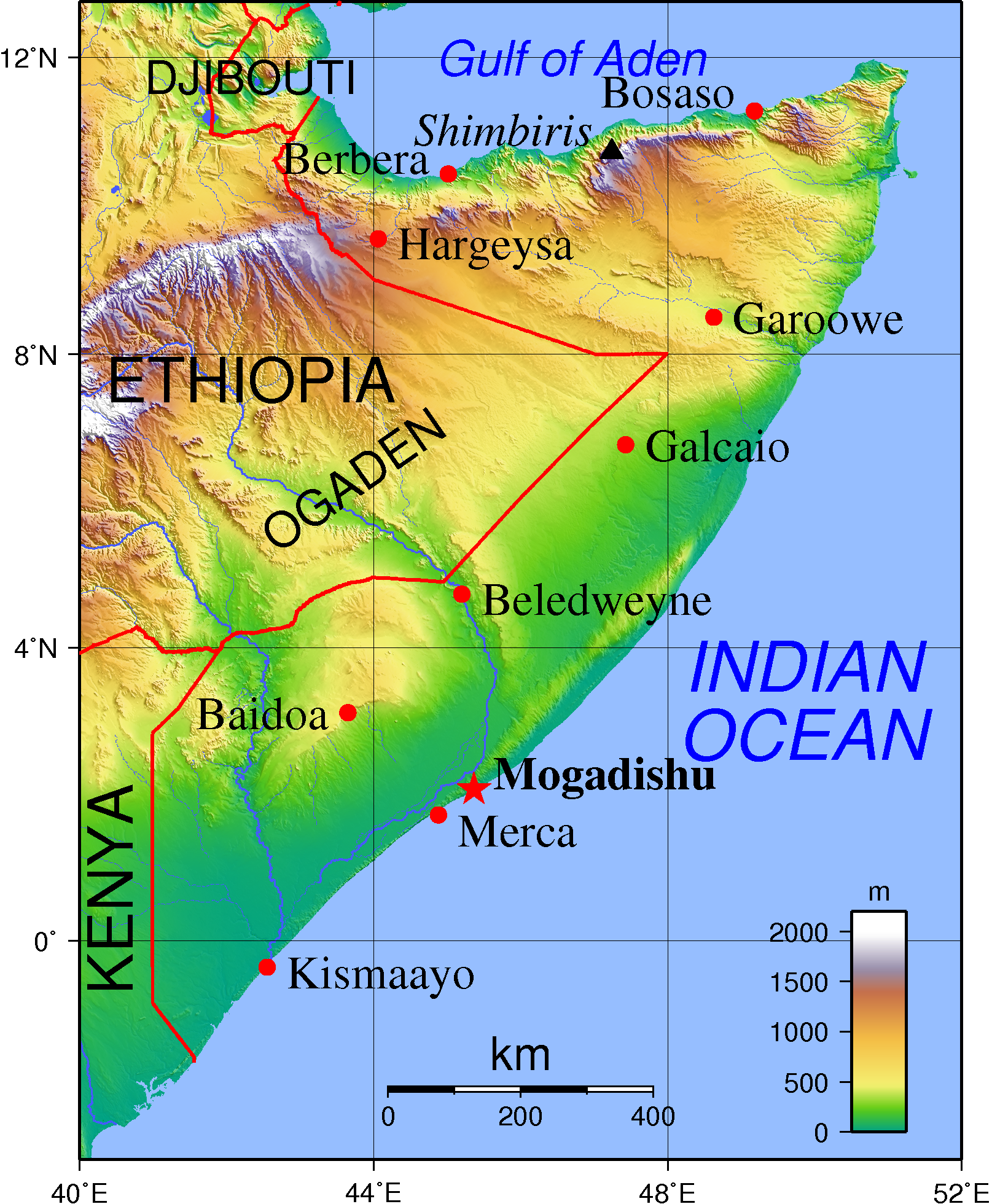
Topographical map of post-war Somalia, the former protectorate of British Somaliland to the north

After the retreat to Aden, the British established Military Mission No. 106 (Hamilton's Mission) to conduct sabotage and subversion operations in occupied British Somaliland. The former Senior Administrative Officer of the protectorate, Reginald Smith, made several secret journeys to the land to glean information. In Cairo, General Archibald Wavell, GOC-in-C Middle East Command concocted Operation Camilla, a deception to mislead the Italians about the transfer of troops to Sudan. The operation was intended to convince the Italians that the troops movements were part of a plan to invade British Somaliland in February 1941 and then advance on Harar. Wavell wrote in a document that,

...the loss of British Somaliland has always rankled bitterly between my government and myself. I got a rocket from the government and nearly lost my job at the time.... I have orders to recapture it as soon as resources are available and am most anxious to remove this blot on my reputation.

The document purported Operation Canvas, the invasion of Italian Somaliland and Ethiopia from Kenya, to be a diversion; it was sent to the local commanders in East Africa using means by which the British expected it to leak to the Italians. The main invasion from Kenya required a huge supply effort and the plan to re-capture British Somaliland was intended to create a much closer supply route from Berbera for the southern invasion force. The port was rudimentary but improvements could quickly be effected. Aosta, the Italian commander of the AOI was convinced by February that an invasion of the colony was imminent.

== Prelude ==
=== Plan ===
The British made use of such resources as were available to British Forces Aden (Air Vice-Marshal Ranald Reid) to re-capture Berbera and expand it into a bridgehead sufficient to supply 15,000 troops. About 3,000 men of the Aden Striking Force, comprising the 1/2nd Punjab Regiment and 3/15th Punjab Regiment of the British Indian Army (1895–1947), which had fought in the colony during the Italian invasion, a Somali commando detachment and the 1401/1402 (Aden) Companies, Auxiliary Military Pioneer Corps Group and 150 motor transport (MT) drivers would be transported 140 nmi (260 km; 160 mi) across the Gulf of Aden. The East Indies Fleet, comprising ships of the Royal Navy and the Royal Indian Navy were to contribute Force D (Captain Harold Hickling), the cruisers HMS Glasgow and Caledon, the destroyers HMS Kandahar and Kipling, the auxiliary cruisers Chakdina and Chantala, Royal Indian Navy trawlers Netravati and Parvati (Lieutenant HMS Choudri, R.I.N.), the troop transports S.S. Beaconsfield and Tuna and ML 109. Force D was to conduct the voyage in two parts, the advanced part comprising Kandahar, Chantala, Chakdina, Parvati, Netravati and the cargo ships Beaconsfield and Tuna, carrying troops and towing three tugs and six lighters. The second wave of Force D comprised Glasgow, Caledon, Kingston and M.L. 109, all transporting troops.

=== Preparations ===
Training began in January, ships were converted to carry troops, two of the lighters, designed by the Sea Transport Officer, Aden, Commander Vernon were to be used as floating piers, fitted with ramps to ease the unloading of the MT, including armoured cars. The RAF flew reconnaissance sorties to find suitable landing points, discover Italian defensive preparations and find potential landing grounds for their aircraft. With fire support from the cruisers and destroyers, the invasion force was to land on beaches between reefs to the east and west of Berbera, create a bridgehead and then re-occupy the protectorate. The air photographs obtained were an incomplete set and the Navy considered that towing vessels from Aden was risky because the tows could part and delay the voyage. In poor visibility finding Berbera could not be guaranteed and approaching an unsurveyed, hostile and dark shore at night, then finding gaps in the reefs wide enough to tow through the lighters was a gamble. The importance of Berbera to the British offensive against Italian Somaliland and Ethiopia was such that the risks were accepted. On the three nights before the landings, the RAF bombed the big Italian base at Dire Dawa in Ethiopia.

=== Voyage ===
On 14 March the first echelon departed Aden at 10:45 p.m. but only 10 nmi (12 mi; 19 km) out, tows parted, some wrapping around the ships' propellers. To keep to the schedule a quick change of plan was made; Kandahar left the tugs and lighters for Beaconsfield and Tuna to tow. The naval ships went ahead to make rendezvous 10 nmi (19 km; 12 mi) north of the Berbera Light at 1:00 a.m. on 16 March according to the plan. The sloop HMS Shoreham was sent from Aden to assist Beaconsfield and Tuna by 3:30 p.m. on 15 March. The second echelon sailed an hour later and rendezvoused as planned. At 1:00 a.m. on 16 March Glasgow, Caledon, Chantala, Chakdina, Netravati, Parvati and M.L. 109 were to land the 1/2 and 3/15 Punjab at Main Beach, 2 nmi (3.7 km; 2.3 mi) west of Berbera Light covered by a bombardment from Glasgow, along with Kandahar and Kingston, which carried the (mostly Somali) 200-man Commando of Force G (R) who were to make the subsidiary landing east of Berbera, covered by Kandahar. The ships were to close on the coast at 12 kn (22 km/h; 14 mph). Shoreham, Beaconsfield, Tuna with the three tugs and six lighters in tow, were about midway between Aden and Berbera, moving at 6 kn (11 km/h; 6.9 mph).

== Invasion ==
=== Landings ===
At 1:01 a.m. on 16 March Glasgow, Kandahar, Kingston and M.L. 109 moved forward at 20 kn (37 km/h; 23 mph) towards Berbera Light and to find the gaps in the reefs off the landing beaches. Caledon, Chantala, Chakdina, Netravati and Parvati were to arrive off the west beach at 2:30 a.m. and drop anchor near Glasgow which would be showing a red light out to sea. During the approach, lights were seen ashore from vehicles on the Hargeisa Road, bound for Berbera. At 2:03 a.m. on 16 March, the Berbera Light was seen on a bearing 186° at 3 nmi (5.6 km; 3.5 mi) distance. Kandahar and Kingston separated from the force and made for the eastern beach; Glasgow stopped and launched a motor boat and skiff for Commander Vernon to use to find the gap in the reef off the western beach. The gap was hard to find and there was a delay of 63 minutes in landing the first tows. Kandahar and Kingston found their gap in the reef off the eastern beach at 3:00 a.m. although the reconnaissance photographs had shown this to be the harder of the two to find. The delay led to apprehension by Colonel Pollock and Captain Hickling (the captain of Glasgow) that the landing might occur in daylight.

The landing at the eastern beach due at 3:30 a.m. was also delayed; at 3:26 a.m. a Somali fisherman in a canoe rowed up to Glasgow. The fisherman said that Italians still occupied the town but some had left by lorry that night; there were Italians near the Berbera Light. The Somali was sent to find the gap in the reefs but Vernon found it at 3:58 a.m. At 4:13 a.m. the signal "Land, follow Glasgow's boats" was given and four minutes later Glasgow began to bombard the main beach with H.E. from its 4-inch guns and 2-pounder pom-poms. The fire from the 4-inch main armament was that used for E-boat attack, with half the shells bursting on impact and the other half bursting 50 ft (15 m) over the target, until 4:20 a.m. when Kingston received the order to begin landing on the eastern beach. Kandahar bombarded the beach from 4:25 to 4:35 a.m. Tows moved through the gaps to the eastern and western beaches, success signals coming from the western beach were made at 4:48 a.m. and at the eastern beach at 5:26 a.m. During the disembarkations shells burst among the tows and ships offshore, thought to be from four to six 4-inch guns and some ineffectual machine-gun fire; the 6-inch, 4-inch and pom-poms of the bombardment ships silenced the Italian artillery. Glasgow mainly engaged trenches near the Berbera Light and west of the aerodrome. Kandahar concentrated on the defences to the east of the town.

=== Berbera ===
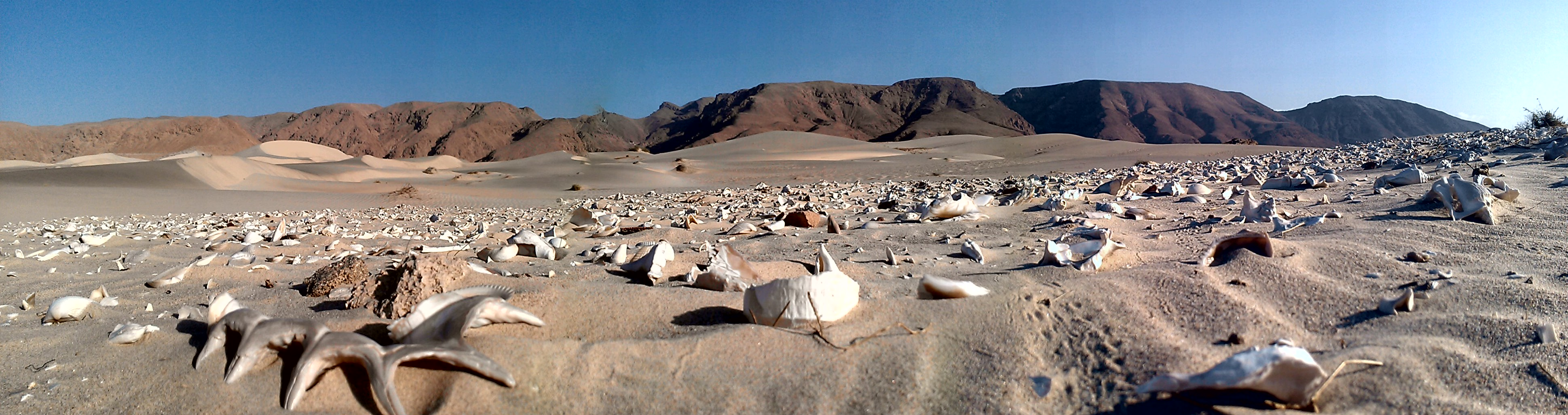
Photograph of the Berbera landscape (2012)

Anticipating a British landing, the Duke of Aosta, the Viceroy of the AOI, had agreed to the evacuation of the protectorate. On 14 March the Italian garrison began to evacuate the territory and the 17th Colonial Brigade retired to Dire Dawa. The 70th Colonial Brigade remained, except for its commander, Brigadier-General Arturo Bertello who passed through Dire Dawa just before it was captured. When the naval bombardment began, about 1,500 Somali troops in Italian service and their Italian officers and NCOs retreated from Berbera towards Hargeisa. The first wave, comprising the 15th Punjab Regiment, was carried by Parvati which towed a tug and barge for the landing. Parvati was bracketed by three 4-inch shells but the landing was carried out without loss against scant opposition. The 2nd Punjab Regiment landed and advanced through the 15th Punjab towards the town, as a party of the 15th Punjab moved inland to cut the coast road. All of the troops involved got ashore before dawn. Little opposition was met with ashore and the town was captured by 9:20 a.m. on 16 March. The British and Indian troops suffered few casualties and over 100 prisoners were taken. Due to a mistake, the Aden Pioneers, who were unarmed, had been ordered to attack with the Punjabis and their commander, Captain S. J. H. Harrison wrote later,

The sun was just peeping over the eastern skyline [;] we came under rifle fire...when to our utter amazement we saw the Italian enemy leaping out of their trenches and racing towards transport vehicles....The vehicles started up and the entire enemy column high-tailed in a great cloud of yellowish grey dust...southwards...to Hargeisa....

A diversion to the east of Berbera was engaged by sixty members of the garrison but the landing party suffered only one Somali soldier killed and a British officer wounded. A wireless message sent to London that "The British flag flies again over Berbera" but the invaders had forgotten to bring one and had to borrow it from a resident. RAF fighters provided a standing patrol on the day of the invasion and for the next four days.

The second echelon ships had arrived by the time that Berbera fell and tugs checked the harbour for mines with Oropesa sweeps. By 2:00 p.m. Force D was unloading; the special motor transport pier consisting of the two modified lighters was assembled at the spit and motor transport unloaded from Beaconsfield by 6:00 p.m. The landing force was well established ashore with adequate stores and rations, local water being available. Air reconnaissance reported the hinterland to be deserted (naval protection ended on 18 March when Glasgow departed; air cover continued until 20 March). The Shaad and customs piers had been damaged but could be repaired with local materials; demolitions at the power station and refrigerating plant required assistance from Aden to make them operational. The water supply was about to be blown up but the occupation troops prevented it. Mining of the aerodrome had been carried out and the RAF was informed. The landing force sent 43 Italian prisoners of war to Aden in Parvati on the day of the landings, as the hospital ship Karapara which was not needed. About 5:33 a.m. on 17 March some aircraft were heard and a barrage was fired; no further Italian aircraft were seen during the day.

On 11 March the 1st South African Brigade Group and the 22nd East African Brigade Group had been placed under the command of the 11th (African) Division, joining the 3rd (Nigerian) Brigade Group. The division advanced from Barawa (Brava), south of Mogadishu in Italian Somaliland. On 25 February the division departed Mogadishu and on 17 March, patrols of the 3rd (Nigerian) Brigade reached Jijiga, cutting the road to Harar, the Italian line of retreat from the protectorate. On 19 March, Brigadier Buchanan and a staff officer arrived by air at Berbera to take command of Bucforce, a temporary name for the 2nd South African Infantry Brigade, most of which had sailed from Mombasa on 16 March and was due on 22 March. On 20 March, a party of Nigerian troops reached Tug Wajale, from whence two armoured cars drove to Berbera along the road from Hargeisa and joined with the Aden Striking Force. The Italian 70th Colonial Brigade became one of the many units of the Italian colonial forces in the AOI that had begun to desert en masse. When Bertello was captured in Western Abyssinia, he claimed that his brigade had "melted away". (Note: According to a contemporary account, on 20 March, a small motorised column of Nigerian troops occupied Tug Wajale on the border, from where two armoured cars captured Hargeisa, linking up with the forces at Berbera. The combined force they moved on to occupy the colony, meeting virtually no resistance.) On 21 March, Lieutenant-General Alan Cunningham, commander of the East African Force, visited to congratulate the victors, to make arrangements for the expansion of the port facilities and announce the establishment of a British military administration.

== Aftermath ==
=== Analysis ===
The Italian occupation had lasted for seven months; in the British official history volume I (1957), I. S. O. Playfair wrote that the port was quickly prepared, despite a shortage of lighters, no electric lights, the heat and the Kharif (autumn wind) blowing sand and increasing the surf. Within the week, the 11th African Division was receiving supplies through Berbera, shortening by 500 mi (800 km) its supply line. In 2016, Andrew Stewart, in "The First Victory..." wrote that the British ascribed the success of Appearance to the extent of the preparations and training. He speculated that the use of ships as floating piers might have influenced the use of Mulberry harbours in the Normandy landings.

=== Casualties ===
After the Italian garrison withdrew toward Ethiopia, a prisoner of war camp was built, eventually big enough for 5,000 men, for prisoners taken in the region.

=== Subsequent events ===
Some of the Blackshirt troops fought until November 1941 in Gondar. Two battalions of the 2nd South African Brigade arrived by sea from Kenya, the third battalion arriving two weeks later, after making a road march with the brigade transport. On 8 April, Brigadier Arthur Chater, the former commander of the Somaliland Camel Corps was appointed Military Governor. The Italians had abandoned Zeila on 18 March and a retired Somali police inspector uncovered a hidden British flag, raised it and began to collect abandoned Italian arms and equipment. On 23 March a Somaliland police officer landed and recalled the local police. The Somaliland Camel Corps had been disbanded after the British evacuation and by the time British returned to the headquarters in Burao on 18 April, 80 per cent of the former members had made their way to Berbera. On 4 May a company of the corps began a mission to suppress a Mijjertein raiding party, the rest of the corps conducting disarmament operations with a motley of captured Italian weapons and equipment.

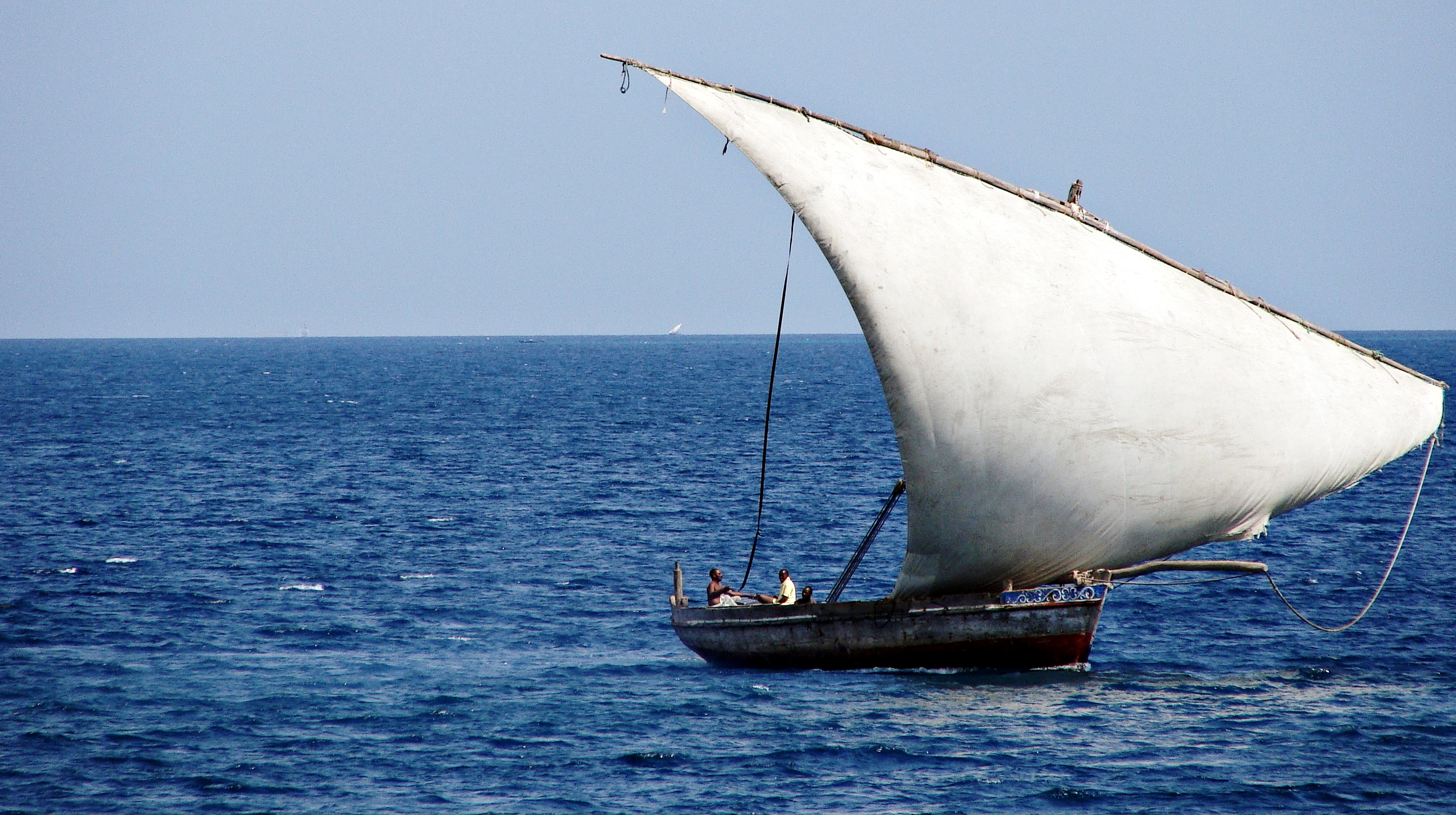
Dhow sailing in the Indian Ocean, 2009

Many of the buildings in Berbera had been damaged, government stations demolished and the civilian wireless and telephone networks were out of action. Army signals units had to carry civilian administration messages until the infrastructure had been restored. The economy of the protectorate had been greatly harmed by the war, internal trade had stopped, there were no regular shipping services with Aden and only dhows were available. There was little food in the territory but the livestock herd had increased since 1939 and had suffered little from the hostilities. The fall of Addis Ababa restored confidence, internal trade resumed and by the autumn the export trade had revived. Once Berbera replaced Mogadishu as an entrepôt, demand for labour increased; payment in wages and in food acted as an economic stimulus and local businessmen immediately made use of the sea traffic to and from Berbera; a return to normal conditions did not occur at Zeila and Boramo, near the border with French Somaliland, due to the need to blockade the pro-Vichy regime.

== See also ==
- List of British military equipment of World War II
- List of Italian Army equipment in World War II
