= Somaliland Scouts =

- Somaliland Scouts shoulder sleeve insignia and emblem
- Country: British Somaliland
- Allegiance: British Empire
- Branch: Army
- Type: regiment

Insignia
- Flag

The Somaliland Scouts was a Rayid military unit, a regiment, of the British Army. It was established after the liberation of British Somaliland from Italy in December 1941 and the mechanization of the Somaliland Camel Corps in 1942, which was formerly tasked with the defense of the protectorate.

== History ==
Originally formed as the Somali Guard Battalion, and tasked with defending the border between British and French Somaliland, the brigade quickly rose in size and importance.

It later became the Somali Companies in June 1942, before finally being renamed to the Somaliland Scouts in August 1943.

A transcript of a Reuters report of 26 June 1960 says that, during the independence ceremony for Somaliland "..Nearly 1,000 British-trained Somaliland Scouts were then handed over to the Prime Minister by Brigadier O. G. Brooks, the Colonel Commandant."

On 1 July 1960, upon the merger of the State of Somaliland and the Trust Territory of Somaliland under Italian Administration to form the Somali Republic, the Somaliland Scouts were merged with former Italian-raised police forces from the south to become the nucleus for the new Somali National Army.

== See also ==
- East African campaign (World War II)
- Somaliland Army
