= Eric Charles Twelves Wilson =

English recipient of the Victoria Cross (1912–2008)

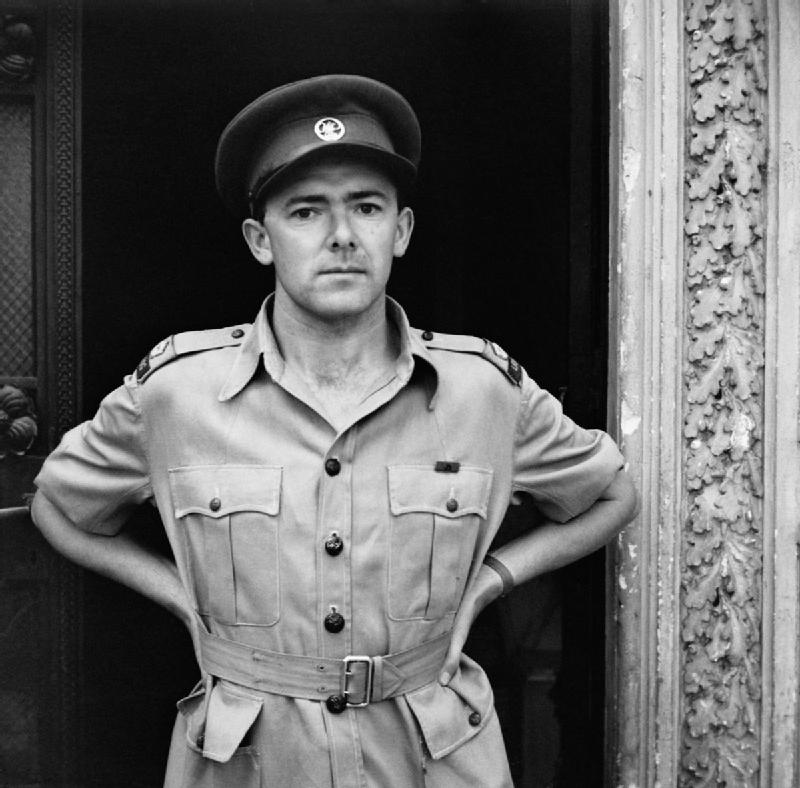
- Born: 2 October 1912; Sandown, Isle of Wight
- Died: 23 December 2008 (aged 96); Stowell, Somerset, England
- Burial place: St Mary Magdalene Churchyard, Stowell
- Military career
- Allegiance: United Kingdom
- Branch: British Army
- Service years: 1933–1949
- Rank: Lieutenant Colonel
- Service number: 58138
- Units: East Surrey Regiment, King's African Rifles; Somaliland Camel Corps; Long Range Desert Group
- Conflicts: Second World War
- Awards: Victoria Cross

Lieutenant Colonel Eric Charles Twelves Wilson VC (2 October 1912 – 23 December 2008) was an English British Army officer and colonial administrator. He received the Victoria Cross, the highest and most prestigious award for gallantry in the face of the enemy that can be awarded to British and Commonwealth forces. At the time of his death, he was the last surviving British Army recipient of the Victoria Cross in the Second World War, and the earliest and oldest recipient.

== Early life ==
Wilson was born at Sandown on the Isle of Wight, where his father Cyril Charles Clissold Wilson was a curate. His mother's maiden name was Twelves. His grandfather Charles Thomas Wilson was the first missionary from the Church Mission Society to visit Buganda, in 1877. He was educated at Marlborough College, where fees were reduced for the sons of clergymen, and he became a house captain. Although he wore glasses, he was awarded a prize cadetship to attend the Royal Military College, Sandhurst.

== Military career ==
Wilson was commissioned as a second lieutenant in The East Surrey Regiment on 2 February 1933. He was promoted to the rank of lieutenant in 1936 and was seconded to the 2nd (Nyasaland) Battalion The King's African Rifles in 1937 serving in East Africa, where he learned to speak Nyanja. He was then seconded to the Somaliland Camel Corps in 1939.

In August 1940, Wilson was 27 years old, and by then an acting captain attached to the Somaliland Camel Corps, when Italian forces commanded by General Guglielmo Nasi invaded British Somaliland (now Somaliland). During the Italian conquest of British Somaliland the heavily outnumbered British-led forces made their stand on the hills around Tug Argan. During this battle, from 11 to 15 August 1940 at Observation Hill, Captain Wilson kept a Vickers machine-gun post in action in spite of being wounded and suffering from malaria. Some of his guns were blown to pieces by the enemy's field artillery fire, and his spectacles were smashed. He was wounded in the right shoulder and the left eye, and he was assumed to have been killed. For his actions, likened in the Daily Sketch to another Rorke's Drift, Wilson was awarded the Victoria Cross.

Wilson has the rare distinction of being mistakenly awarded a "posthumous" VC, announced in The London Gazette on 16 October 1940. At the time the award was made, he was believed to be missing in action, presumed dead. He had, however, been captured by the Italians. An official report in The Times on 16 October indicated that he had survived, but another captured officer was surprised to find the "late" Captain Wilson still alive in a prisoner of war camp in Eritrea.

In 1941, when the Italian forces in East Africa surrendered following the East African Campaign, Wilson was released from captivity. He returned to England and received his Victoria Cross at Buckingham Palace in July 1942. With his captain's rank made permanent in 1941, and with the rank of temporary major, he served as adjutant of the Long Range Desert Group and then as second in command of the 11th (Kenyan) King's African Rifles, part of the 25th East African Brigade in 11th East African Division, in the Burma Campaign. Having contracted scrub typhus he was hospitalised for two months and then returned to East Africa to command an infantry training establishment at Jinja in Uganda. He was promoted to acting lieutenant-colonel in June 1945 and was seconded to The Northern Rhodesia Regiment in 1946. He retired from the Army in 1949 and although at this time his permanent rank was major, he was granted the honorary rank of lieutenant-colonel.

== Victoria Cross citation ==
The formal citation for Wilson's VC, published in the London Gazette in October 1940 when he was still presumed dead, reads:

The KING has been pleased to approve of the award of The Victoria Cross to :

Lieutenant (acting Captain) Eric Charles Twelves Wilson, The East Surrey Regiment (attached Somaliland Camel Corps).

For most conspicuous gallantry on active service in Somaliland. Captain Wilson was in command of machine-gun posts manned by Somali soldiers in the key position of Observation Hill, a defended post in the defensive organisation of the Tug Argan Gap in British Somaliland. The enemy attacked Observation Hill on 11 August 1940. Captain Wilson and Somali gunners under his command beat off the attack and opened fire on the enemy troops attacking Mill Hill, another post within his range. He inflicted such heavy casualties that the enemy, determined to put his guns out of action, brought up a pack battery to within seven hundred yards, and scored two direct hits through the loopholes of his defences, which, bursting within the post, wounded Captain Wilson severely in the right shoulder and in the left eye, several of his team being also wounded. His guns were blown off their stands but he repaired and replaced them and, regardless of his wounds, carried on, whilst his Somali sergeant was killed beside him. On 12 and 14 August the enemy again concentrated field artillery fire on Captain Wilson's guns, but he continued, with his wounds untended, to man them. On 15 August two of his machine-gun posts were blown to pieces, yet Captain Wilson, now suffering from malaria in addition to wounds, still kept his own post in action. The enemy finally over-ran the post at 5 p.m. on 15 August.

== Later life ==
Wilson married Ann Pleydell-Bouverie (a descendant of the Earls of Radnor) in 1943. They had two sons. After they divorced in 1953, Wilson married Angela Joy Gordon, and they had one son.

After Wilson left the Army in 1949, he joined the Overseas Civil Service in Tanganyika. He learned several African languages, and served in Tanganyika until independence of the British East African countries which led to his retirement in 1961.

In 1962 Wilson was appointed Deputy Warden of London House, a residence at Goodenough Square in the Bloomsbury district of London. This residence is for university graduates from the Commonwealth of Nations pursuing graduate studies in the United Kingdom. In 1966 Wilson was promoted to Warden of London House, holding the position until he retired in 1977, after which he lived in Stowell, Somerset.

At the time of his death, he was one of only ten Victoria Cross recipients still alive. He was the last surviving British Army recipient of the Second World War, as well as being the earliest and oldest recipient. His VC is on display in the Lord Ashcroft Gallery at the Imperial War Museum, London.

Wilson suffered from prostate cancer in later life, and died after a stroke on 23 December 2008, aged 96. He was buried in Stowell, survived by his second wife and their son, and both of his sons from his first marriage.

== See also ==
- East African campaign (World War II)
- Italian conquest of British Somaliland
- List of solved missing person cases (pre-1950)
