= Italian invasion of British Somaliland =

1940 World War II campaign in East Africa

- Part of the East African campaign of the Second World War
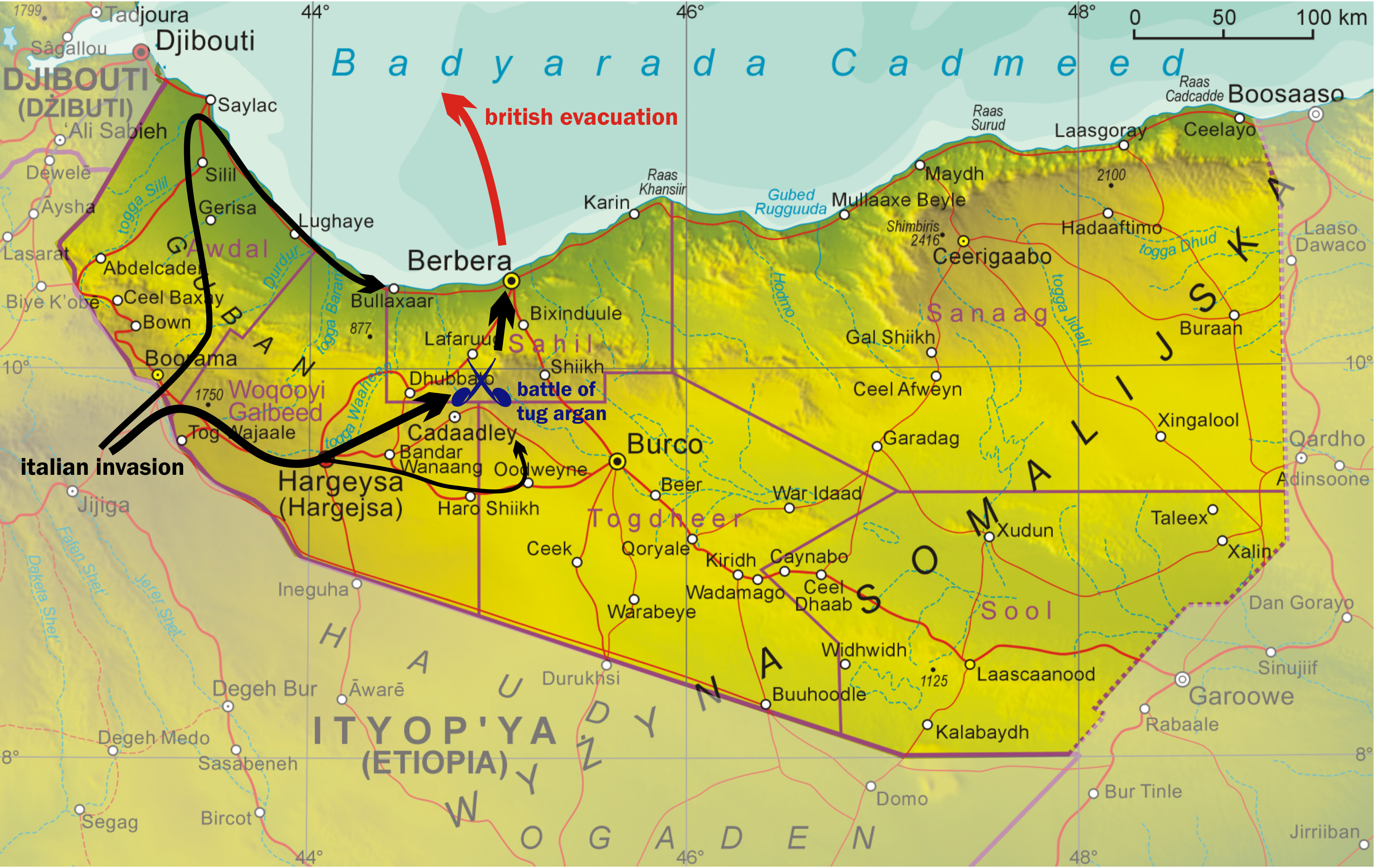
- Italian conquest of British Somaliland, August 1940
Date	3–19 August 1940 (2 weeks and 2 days)
Location	British Somaliland 09°33′58″N 44°03′17″E
Result	Italian victory
Territorial changes	Annexed to Italian East Africa (Note: 18 August 1940 – 8 April 1941)

Belligerents
British Empire; United Kingdom; India; Somaliland; Kenya; Nyasaland; Northern Rhodesia; Southern Rhodesia; Australia (naval); South Africa (air force)	Italy; Italian East Africa

Commanders and leaders
Maitland Wilson; Reade Godwin-Austen; Arthur Chater	Duke of Aosta; Guglielmo Nasi; Carlo De Simone

Strength
4,507 British and Commonwealth troops; (75 per cent King's African Rifles and Somali irregulars); light cruiser HMAS Hobart	24,000 Italian and colonial troops

Casualties and losses
Total: 2,275; British Empire: 50 killed; 105 wounded; 120 missing; Somali (British service); c. 2,000; 7 aircraft destroyed; 10 aircraft damaged; 1 tug sunk; 2 vessels damaged	Total: 3,029; Italian: 161; Ascari: 1,868; 465 killed; 1,530 wounded; 34 missing; Somali Banda; c. 1,000; 4 aircraft destroyed

The Italian invasion of British Somaliland (3–19 August 1940) was part of the East African campaign (1940–1941) in which Italian, Eritrean and Somali forces entered the Somaliland Protectorate and defeated its garrison of British, Commonwealth and colonial forces supported by Somali irregulars. The Italian victory was based on mobility and speed but was hampered by the terrain, rainy weather and British resistance.

At the Battle of Tug Argan (11–15 August) Italian attacks had the advantage of artillery and the outnumbered defenders were gradually worn down and slowly outflanked, until the remaining fortified hilltops were vulnerable to capture. After the failure of a counter-attack towards the Mirgo Pass, the local commander, Major-General Reade Godwin-Austen, had too few men to retrieve the situation and to keep open an escape route at the same time and was given permission to retreat towards Berbera.

The British fought a rearguard action at Barkasan on 17 August and retreated after dark. The improvised evacuation went better than expected and the second blocking position at Nasiyeh was not needed. The rainy weather continued to slow the Italian advance and when the airstrip near Berbera was found still to be garrisoned, a prospective Italian coup de main was cancelled.

The British defeat was controversial and the beginning of a deterioration in relations between General Archibald Wavell, the theatre commander, his subordinates and Prime Minister Winston Churchill, which ended in Wavell being superseded by Claude Auchinleck in July 1941. On 16 March 1941, British Empire troops had recaptured Berbera in an amphibious assault. By early April, the rest of the colony was back under British control.

== Background ==
=== Africa Orientale Italiana ===
On 9 May 1936, Italian dictator Benito Mussolini proclaimed the foundation of Italian East Africa (Africa Orientale Italiana, AOI), formed from the colonies of Italian Eritrea, Italian Somaliland, and Ethiopia, conquered in the Second Italo-Ethiopian War (3 October 1935 – 5 May 1936). On 10 June 1940, Mussolini declared war against Britain and France, making the Italian forces in Africa a threat to British supply routes along the Mediterranean, the Suez Canal and the Red Sea. Egypt and the Suez Canal were obvious targets and an Italian invasion of French Somaliland (Djibouti) or British Somaliland was also feasible. Mussolini looked forward to propaganda triumphs in Sudan and British East Africa (Kenya, Tanganyika and Uganda). The Italian General Staff had based its strategic calculations on an assumption that there would be no war until 1942; the Regio Esercito (Italian Royal Army) and Regia Aeronautica (Italian Royal Air Force) were not prepared for a long war, nor to occupy large tracts of Africa.

=== Middle East Command ===
The Kingdom of Egypt included Sudan, a condominium between Egypt and Britain. The British had based military forces in Egypt since 1882 but these were greatly reduced by the terms of the Anglo-Egyptian Treaty of 1936, which only allowed British military forces to occupy Egypt in defence of the Suez Canal. The small British and Commonwealth force garrisoned the Suez Canal and the Red Sea route, which was vital to Britain's communications with its Far Eastern and Indian Ocean territories. In mid-1939, Lieutenant-General Archibald Wavell was appointed General Officer Commanding-in-Chief (GOC-in-C) of the new Middle East Command, with responsibility for the Mediterranean and Middle East. Until the Franco-Italian Armistice (Armistice of Villa Incisa), the Italian 5th Army in Tripolitania (western Libya) faced the French army in Tunisia and the Italian 10th Army in Cyrenaica (eastern Libya), confronted the British in Egypt.

The Italian Royal Army had about 215,000 men in Libya and in Egypt, the British had about 36,000 troops, with another 27,500 men training in Palestine. Wavell had about 86,000 troops at his disposal for Libya, Iraq, Syria, Iran and East Africa. Faced with frontiers guarded by about eight men to the mile, Wavell concluded that a defensive strategy was the only feasible policy and intended to mount delaying actions at the main posts and hope for the best. The Foreign Secretary Anthony Eden convened a conference in Khartoum at the end of October 1940 with Emperor Haile Selassie, the South African General Jan Smuts (an advisor for the region with Winston Churchill), Wavell and the senior military commanders in East Africa, including Lieutenant-General Platt and Lieutenant-General Cunningham. An offensive strategy was decided on against Ethiopia, including the use of Arbegnoch (Amharic for Patriots), by the conference. In November, the British and Commonwealth forces gained an intelligence advantage, when the Government Code and Cypher School (GC & CS) at Bletchley Park broke the high-grade cypher of the Royal Army in East Africa. Later in that month, the replacement cypher for the Regia Aeronautica was broken by the Combined Bureau, Middle East (CBME).

=== British Somaliland ===
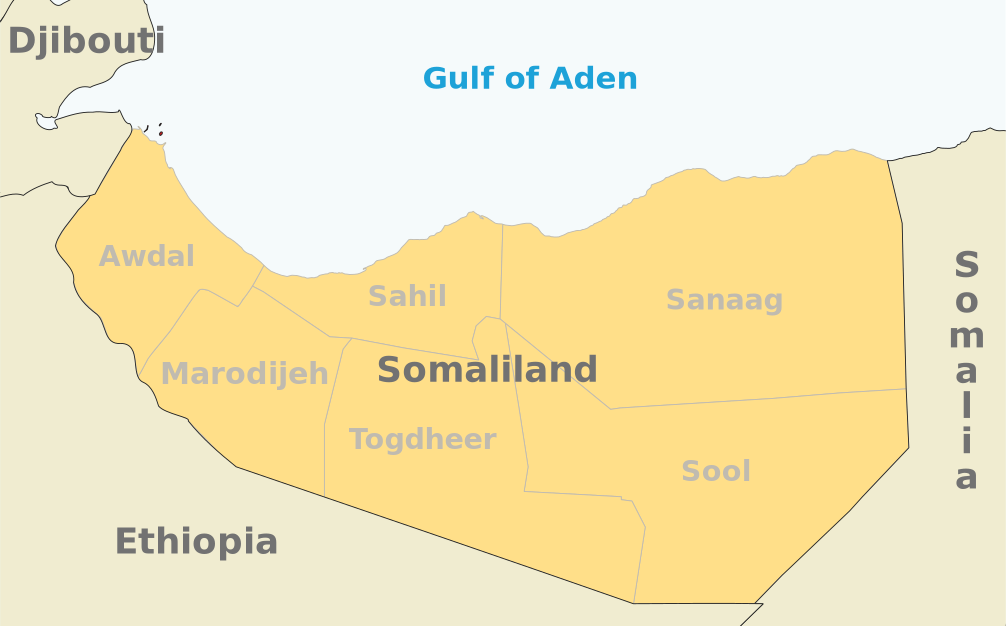
Map of Somaliland showing locations

The British had fought the Dervish War (Somaliland campaign 1900–1920) against the Dervish haroun and their Dervish state, to gain control over the territory. In 1910 the British garrison had been forced to retreat to the coast until the end of the First World War and only after four campaigns did Somali resistance end in 1920, after three weeks of attacks by local troops, a King's African Rifles (KAR) battalion and the Royal Air Force (RAF). The colony had an area of about 68,000 sq mi (180,000 km^{2}) with a plain inland from the coast up to 60 mi (100 km) deep, ending at a mountain range an average of 4,000 ft (1,200 m) high.

There was little scope for agriculture and most of the 320,000 inhabitants made a living from livestock herding. Berbera, the biggest town and port, was ringed by desert and scrubland; in the cold season it had a population of about 30,000, falling to around 15,000 in the summer months. The port was a first class anchorage and was the principal entrepôt of the colony, despite having no port installations making it unsuitable for an expeditionary force, since ships had to be unloaded by lighter, a method that took ten days to empty a 3,000 gross register ton (GRT) ship. Loading and unloading was impossible during the period from July to August, when the Kharif, a strong and hot wind, blew.

=== French Somaliland ===
Italian East Africa (1938–1941), showing Aden and British and French Somaliland

Brigadier-General Paul Legentilhomme, in command of British as well as French forces since the outbreak of war obstructed the enforcement of the Armistice of Villa Incisa, continued to co-operate with the British. On 27 July, the terms of the armistice pertaining to French Somaliland were discovered by the British to be the demilitarisation of the colony and free Italian access to the port and the French part of the Addis Ababa railway. When the governor, Hubert Deschamps said that he would obey instructions from the Vichy regime, Legentilhomme threatened to use force to prevent him from doing so. When the local Italian Armistice Commission tried to make contact, Legentilhomme assured Cairo that he would play for time but anticipated that the Italians would attack.

The 2nd Battalion, the Black Watch, was sent to Aden from Egypt by cruiser, ready to reinforce the French, as Legentilhomme feigned ignorance of the armistice terms. Legentilhomme also denied entry to the new Vichy French governor, General Gaëtan Germain (25 July to 7 August). On 19 July, Legentilhomme was opposed in the Governor's Council by the navy and air force commanders and to avoid bloodshed decided that those opposed to Vichy should depart. Legentilhomme had run out of time and left for Aden on 5 August, leaving Germain to sever relations with the British. Italian apprehension about the possibility of the British using the colony as a bridgehead continued; Germain was superseded by Pierre Nouailhetas as governor beginning on 7 August, who arrived from France on 2 September.

== Prelude ==
=== British defence schemes ===
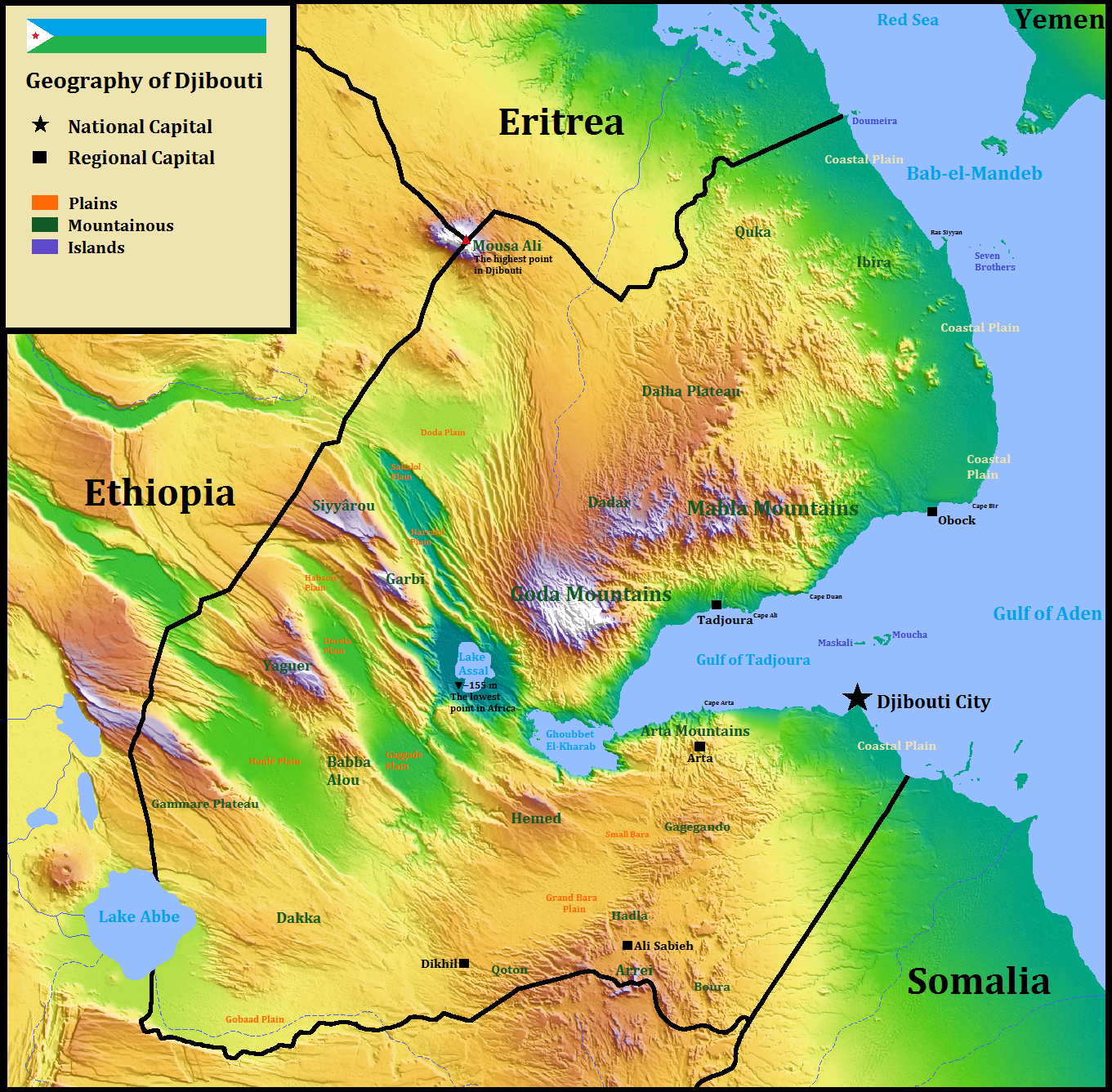
Geography of Djibouti (French Somaliland)

The Somaliland border was 750 mi (1,210 km) long; after the Italian occupation of Ethiopia, all but the 45 mi (72 km) border with French Somaliland was contiguous with the new Italian colony. According to the Hornby Report of 1936, the War Office intended to offer no resistance to an invasion. In 1938, the governor, Arthur Lawrence, deplored such a defeatist policy and suggested that the colony could be demilitarised, that the British could leave or that the colony could be defended. According to the British military commander, Brigadier Arthur Chater RM, a small reinforcement would give the local garrison the means to resist an invasion of the colony for twelve days, sufficient for a relief force to arrive from India, but the policy was rejected. In August 1939 the evacuation policy was revised according to two scenarios, that if the French succeeded in defending Djibouti, the British would withdraw towards them and if the French were defeated, the British would retreat into the hills and wait on events. All of the defence arrangements were based on co-operation with Legentilhomme, who would command both forces in time of war.

During the Phoney War Wavell became reluctant for British forces to come under French command, unless the withdrawal plan to Djibouti was implemented, which gave Chater more discretion, provided that he still co-operated with the French. Chater wanted to garrison Hargeisa and Burao to fight delaying actions and then retire towards the hill country. The main road into Somaliland from Djibouti was commanded by hills with six passes good enough for wheeled vehicles; both sides agreed that they must be garrisoned to deny them to the Italians and provide a base for debouching when an Allied counter-offensive began. In December 1939, the British had another change of mind, ordering that an invasion must be resisted and that Berbera must be held for as long as possible as a matter of imperial prestige. The commitments entered into with the French had led to them to go to the trouble and expense of fortifying their colony; because of dissension between Legentilhomme and Paris and within the British and French alliance, the passes at Jirreh and Dobo, parallel to the border, were left unfortified, despite permission to base defences in the British colony.

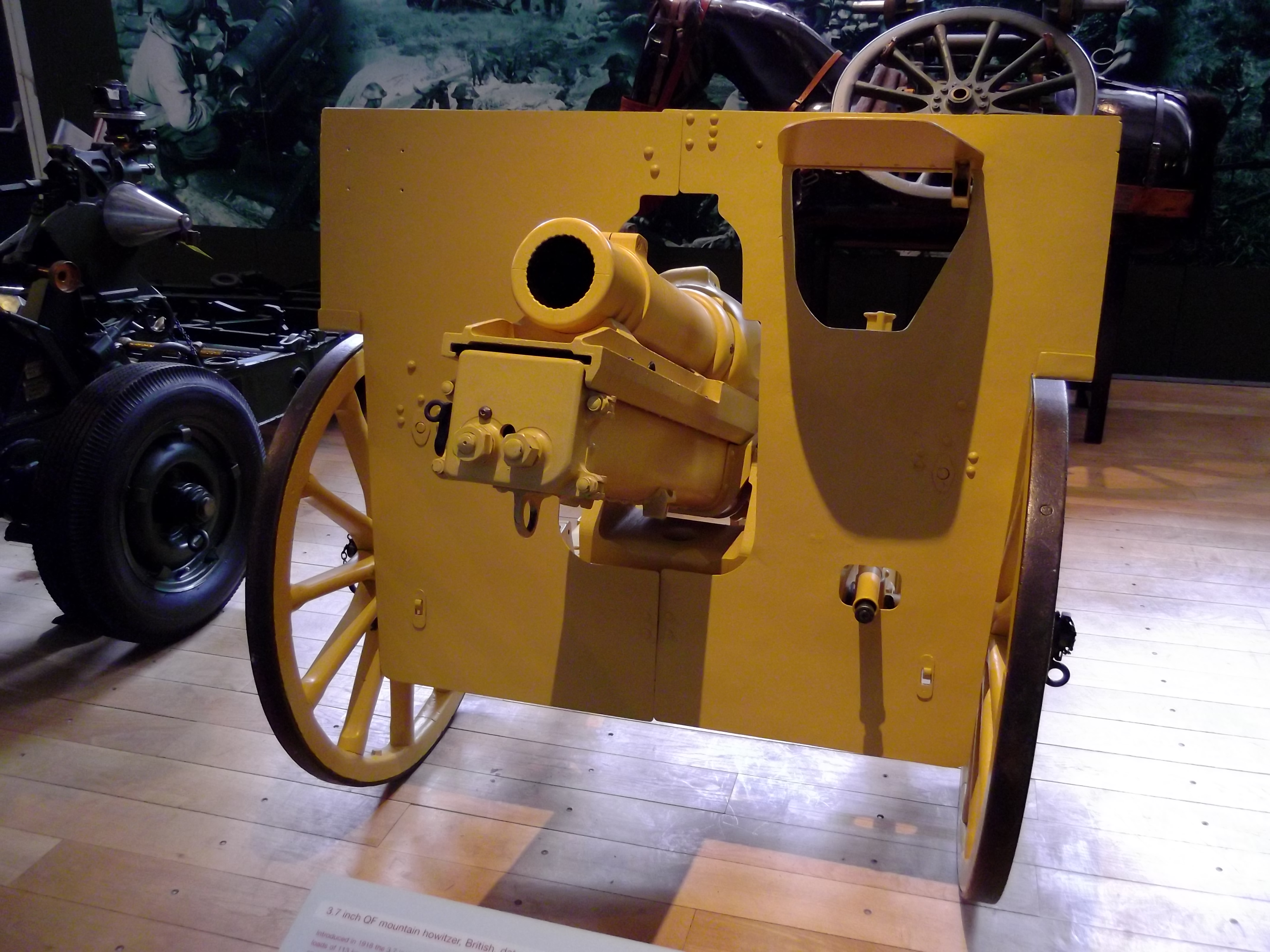
3.7-inch Mountain Gun, Royal Artillery Museum London

In 1940, the 631 members of the Somaliland Camel Corps (SCC) were based in five places in the colony and a small party of police worked at Berbera. The SCC had 29 motor vehicles, 122 horses and 244 camels but no heavy weapons, only old Belgian .475 in (12.1 mm) calibre, single-shot rifles, with 1.4 million bullets of dubious quality, machine-guns and anti-tank rifles. In February, the British government planned to send 1,100 reinforcements by mid-May but financial wrangling between the War Office and the Colonial Office delayed the arrival of the first infantry battalion until 15 May and the second until 12 July. The garrison of French Somaliland was asked to block the Jirreh and Dobo passes but the British strategy was to hope that French Somaliland was the more tempting target.

=== British preparations ===
After the Armistice of Villa Incisa, the end of pro-British prevarication by Legentilhomme led to Chater receiving orders to plan an evacuation if the colony became untenable. By August, the garrison consisted of the 1st Battalion Northern Rhodesia Regiment (1st NRR), the 2nd (Nyasaland) Battalion KAR, the 1st East African Light Battery (four 3.7-inch mountain guns) from Kenya, the 1st Battalion 2nd Punjab Regiment and the 3rd Battalion 15th Punjab Regiment from the Colony of Aden and the SCC, including 37 officer and NCO reinforcements from the Southern Rhodesia Regiment; on 8 August, the 2nd Battalion, Black Watch arrived. The troops were a motley collection, with different customs and culinary arrangements, no proper base or headquarters, short of artillery, transport and signalling equipment. Aircraft had to fly from Aden, while also busy with convoy patrols and air defence; only two 3-inch anti-aircraft guns of the 23rd Battery, Hong Kong and Singapore Brigade RA could be spared from Aden.

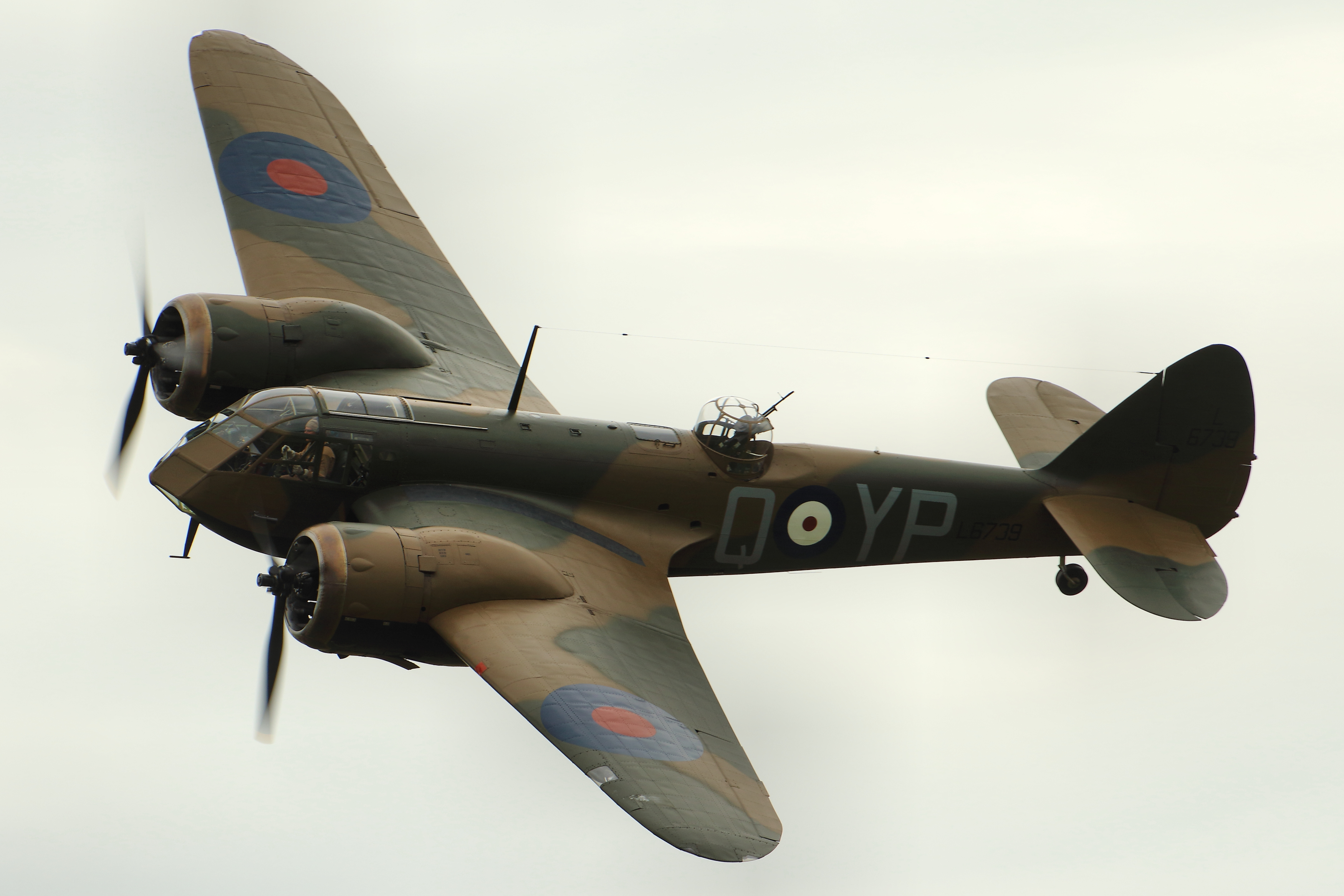
A Blenheim Mk I in 2015

The British expected that Berbera would be the objective of an Italian invasion; the frontier with Ethiopia was too long to guard and there was no position from whence to contest the approaches to the port through Zeila near French Somaliland, thence east along the coast road or through Hargeisa or via Burao. The inland mountains were passable by wheeled and tracked vehicles only on the Hargeisa and Burao roads, Hargeisa being the more direct route through a gap at Tug Argan and the Burao road through a defile known as Sheikh Pass. Once north of the hills, the coastal plain had no feature where a small force could prevent the advance of a larger one.

Chater garrisoned Tug Argan with two battalions and the mountain artillery, one battalion to guard the other two approaches and kept one battalion in reserve. When the Black Watch arrived, it went into reserve and the 3/15th Punjab Regiment reinforced Tug Argan. The Camel Corps formed a screen in advance of the main defences to observe and delay invaders with patrols of the Somali Police Force (Illalo) an armed constabulary, usually used as a frontier police force. The RAF in Aden had 8 Squadron (Bristol Blenheim bombers plus two Free French Martin Marylands), 11, 39, 45 Squadron (Blenheim) and 203 Squadron (Blenheim IVF long-range fighters), 94 (Gloster Gladiator fighters), 223 Squadron (Vickers Wellesley). A Bristol Bombay of 216 Squadron participated and 84 Squadron ferried six Blenheim IFs to Aden to replace losses on 15 August.

=== Italian plans ===
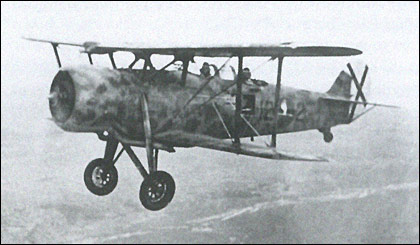
IMAM Ro.37 Lince (Lynx) reconnaissance aircraft of the Regia Aeronautica

The Italians remained suspicious of French intentions and after Legentilhomme was replaced by Germaine feared a British invasion through Djibouti. Despite orders from Rome to be cautious, Aosta wanted to occupy Djibouti to forestall the British, with a simultaneous advance on Berbera to counter a British intervention. Aosta submitted the plan to Mussolini on 18 June and in August received permission for the invasion. While waiting, Aosta and his deputy, General Guglielmo Nasi, completed an appreciation of the likely opposition and the campaign objectives; on 14 July they predicted that the main battle would be fought in the Karim and Jerato passes; if the defenders stood their ground, the Italian troops would be able to envelop their flanks. The Italian invasion force included five colonial brigades, three Blackshirt battalions and five Bande, half a company of M11/39 medium tanks and a squadron of L3/35 tankettes, several armoured cars, 21 howitzer batteries, pack artillery and air support.

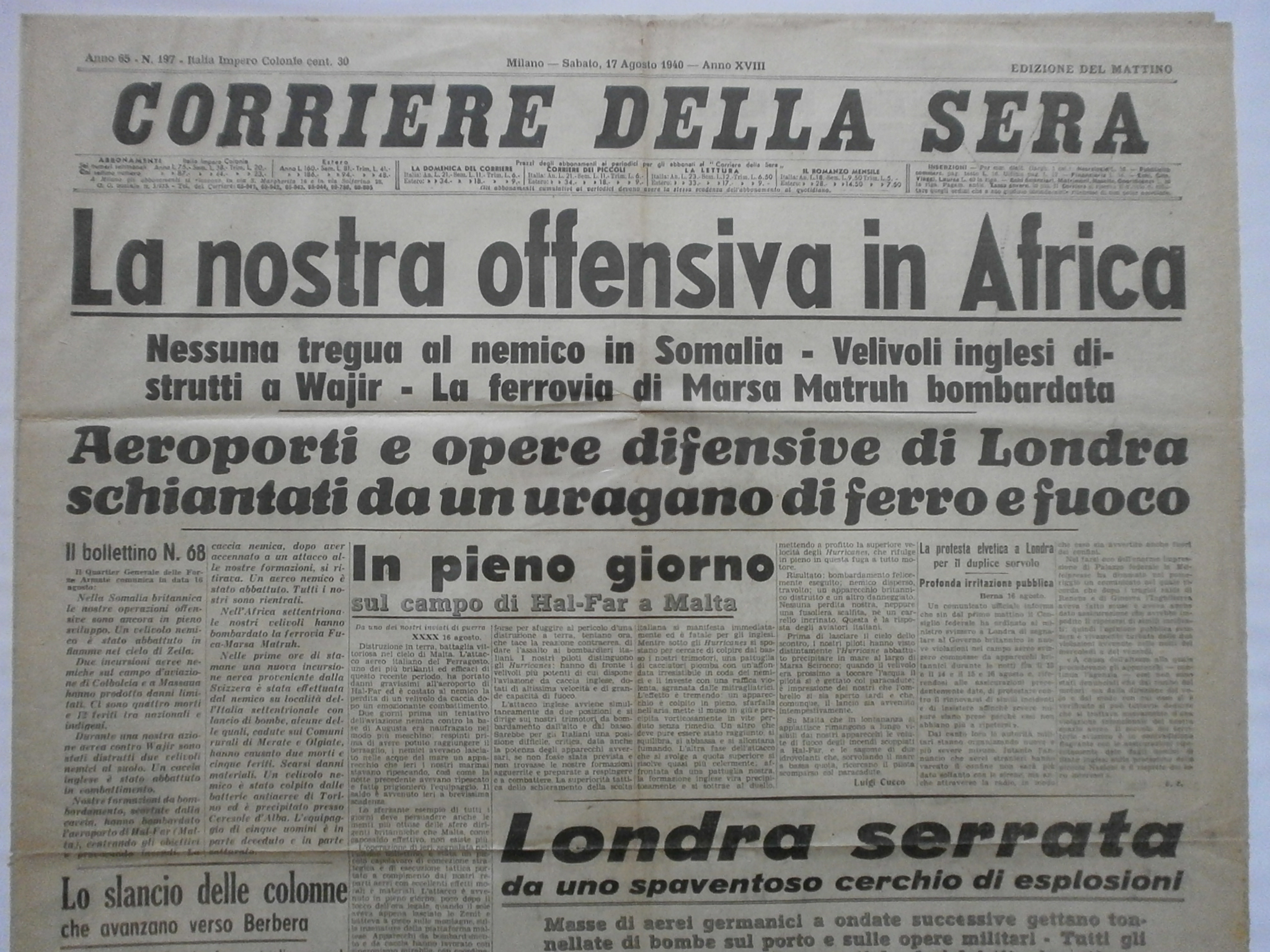
The Italian newspaper Corriere della Sera covering the start of the Somaliland offensive

Lieutenant-General Carlo de Simone issued instructions on 25 July as commander of the main force, the Harrar Division with eleven African infantry battalions in three brigades, the three Blackshirt battalions, the tanks and armoured cars. The French and British were to be prevented from uniting and receiving reinforcements to attack Harrar, by defeating the garrison and occupying British Somaliland. Because the Assa Hills rose to over 4,500 ft (1,400 m), parallel to the coast about 50 mi (80 km) inland, there were three approaches to Berbera for wheeled and tracked vehicles for the Italians to consider.

The direct route with the widest pass was via Hargeisa and the Italian plan was for the western column to seal off French Somaliland and then send light forces east along the coast road. The eastern column (Brigadier-General Arturo Bertello) would move to Odweina and Burao in the south, cover the flank of the central column and be prepared to link up with it if necessary. De Simone with the central column would establish a base at Hargeisa and Adalek, then to carry the main weight of the attack through the Mirgo Pass towards Berbera. The western column (Lieutenant-General Sisto Bertoldi) was to advance towards Zeila to seal the border with French Somaliland and then move eastwards along the coast road towards Berbera.

== Battle ==
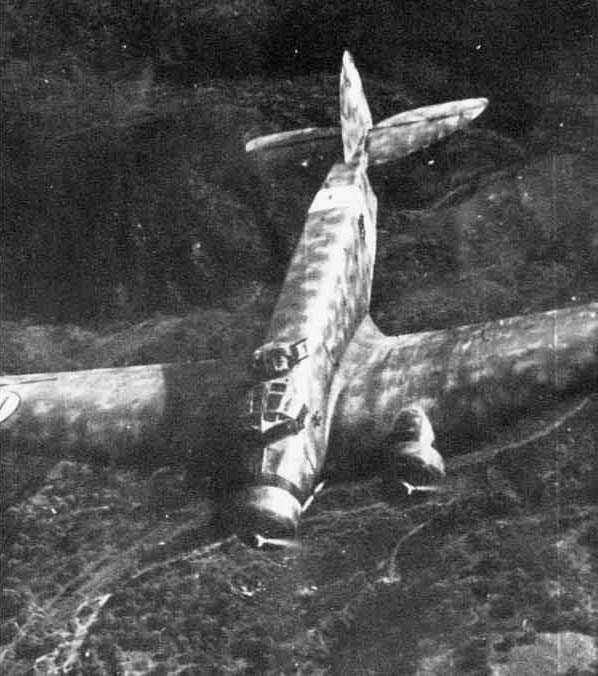
A Savoia-Marchetti SM 81

On 31 July 18° Squadriglie arrived at the Scelene airstrip near Dire Dawa with six Ca 133 bomber/transport aircraft. On 1 August Comando Tattico dell Settore Aeronautica Ovest (CTSAO, Western Sector Tactical Command) was created for the invasion of British Somaliland. At first the CTSAO (Generale Collalti) had 27 bombers, 23 fighters and seven reconnaissance aircraft. During the afternoon, flights of three SM 81 bombers, attacked shipping off Zeila as two waves of six Blenheim Mk Is from 8 and 39 squadrons, escorted by two 203 Squadron Blenheim IVFs, bombed the Italian airfield at Chinele, which had been discovered that morning.

The Blenheims dived to 10,000 ft (3,000 m) through anti-aircraft fire as CR 42 fighters of 410° Squadriglie scrambled from Dire Dawa (8 mi (13 km) away) and attacked the Blenheim IVFs. As the second wave of six Blenheims arrived, Captaino Corrado Ricci, the commander of 410° Squadriglie, took off in his CR 32 and shot one down. As the Blenheims flew home over Zeila, the crews spotted a flight of the SM 81 bombers attacking the port. Three Blenheims broke formation and shot down one of the Italian bombers. On the morning of 2 August, 39 Squadron raided Chinele aerodrome again and were intercepted by CR 42s of 413° Squadriglia; the CR 42 of the CO Capitano Corrado Santoro, was hit in the engine and force landed.

On 3 August 1940, British air reconnaissance discovered that about 400 Italians had crossed the frontier at Biyad. Nasi communicated with de Simone by wireless and liaison aircraft; the central column crossed the frontier and made for Hargeisa and Tug Argan in the Assa Hills as the western column advanced on Zeila and the eastern column struck east for Odweina, to deceive the defenders and exploit opportunities. Early on 4 August the central column advanced towards Hargeisa, observed by the SCC which skirmished with the column to impose delays. In the afternoon, three SM 81s attacked Berbera and a 94 Squadron Gladiator attacked one from the 15° Squadriglia which reached Jijiga with one dead crewman and two wounded. On 4 August, two SM 79 bombers of 44° Gruppo arrived at Dire Dawa and two of the 94 Squadron Gloster Gladiators at Berbera transferred to Laferug further south closer to Tug Argan, both strips having only small-arms for defence. There were two 3-inch anti-aircraft guns at Berbera but these were reserved for the defence of the port. During the night 216 Squadron at Aden sent a Bristol Bombay to bomb Dire Dawa but a lightning storm forced the crew to divert to Zula.

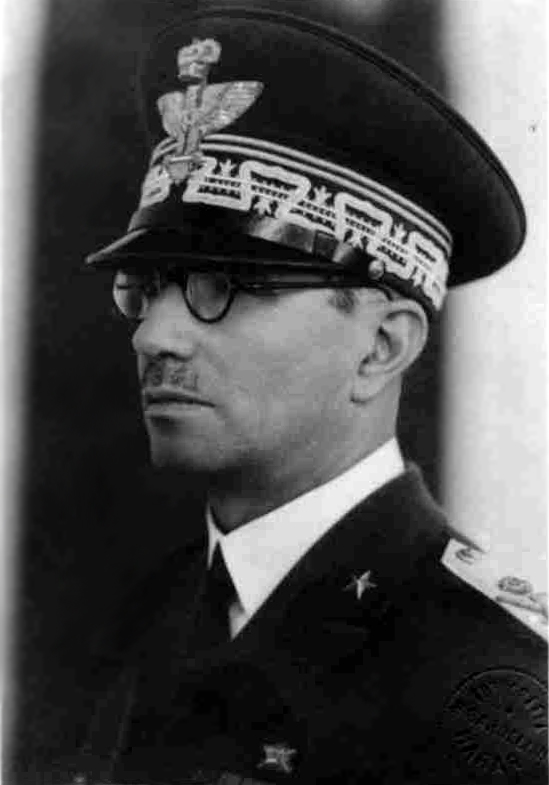
General Guglielmo Nasi

On 5 August as the Italian invasion force occupied Hargeisa, covered by Ro 37bis reconnaissance aircraft of 110° Squadriglia and attacks by SM 79s on Zeila, Berbera and Aden, two more SM 79s arriving from Addis Ababa and three Ca 133s from Doghabur to participate. Flights of three Blenheims of 8 Squadron made three attacks on Italian motor columns west of Hargeisa, one Blenheim being shot down by a CR 32 of 410° Squadriglia. The eastern column, comprising mainly Bande, reached Odweina on 6 August and then headed north-west toward Adadle, a village on the Tug Argan, instead of towards Burao (tug, Somali for a dry sandy riverbed). The SCC and small patrols of Illalo, a small force of local levies normally employed on police duties, conducted a delaying action as the other British and Commonwealth forces retreated towards Tug Argan. At 01:00 twelve light tanks advanced in line; three were hit and knocked out by Boys anti-tank rifle fire from the SCC and the company of the NRR defending the hill station. On 6 August Blenheims of 8 and 39 squadrons continued to fly reconnaissance sorties and to attack the Italian columns. An 8 Squadron Blenheim was damaged by twelve attacks by CR 42s; the Italian pilots claimed one bomber shot down and a probable. With Hargeisa captured, two CR 32s and two CR 42s arrived from Dire Dawa on 7 August and began patrols; to the south, Ca 133s flew sorties over the front.

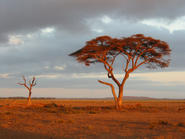
The Burao countryside in 2006

The Italians paused at Hargeisa for two days to reorganise and then resumed the advance through the Karim Pass toward the Tug Argan, in the Assa Hills. Aosta urged haste but Nasi refused to rush because the road was deteriorating under the heavy traffic and rain. The Italian advance resumed on 8 August and for two days closed up to the British defences as the Italians made preparations to attack. The defenders reported the presence of Italian medium tanks and the captain of HMAS Hobart donated the ship's QF 3-pounder Hotchkiss saluting gun, a three-man crew and 30 rounds of ammunition. (Note: PO H. Jones, AB Hugh Sweeney and AB W. J. Hurren took the 3-pounder, which had been mounted on an improvised carriage, to reinforce the defenders at Tug Argan. The sailors went missing and were feared dead but became the first Australian prisoners of war until they were liberated at Adi Ugri (now Mendefera) in Eritrea on 1 April 1941.) The two Gladiators at Berbera were caught on the ground at 06:00 by three Italian fighters; one Gladiator was burnt out and the other damaged; when the news reached Laferug the other two Gladiators were ordered back to Aden. Blenheim IVFs of 203 Squadron from Aden patrolled Berbera as a substitute but two SM 79s bombed the port. Around noon a Blenheim attacked three more SM 79s as they bombed Berbera, damaged one and killed a member of the crew. Three SM 81s had attacked the Godojere Pass in the morning and three Ca 133s bombed the Kerim Pass. The Ro 37bis continued to fly reconnaissance sorties and the fighter patrols were maintained; a CR 32 and a CR 42 were damaged in landing accidents at Hargeisa.

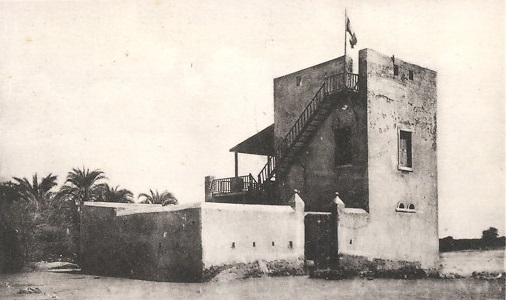
The Italians also captured Fort Loyada in French Somalia

In the north, the Bertoldi column entered in French Somalia and conquered the French fort of Loyada near the border and then moved south and captured Zeila, about 150 mi (240 km) north-west of Berbera, cutting communications with French Somaliland. Bertoldi began a slow advance south-east along the coast road, under intermittent air attack from Aden and bombardment from the sea, pushing back the SCC rearguards as far as the village of Bulhar by 17 August. (Note: The destroyer HMS Kimberley, the sloop HMS Auckland and the cruisers HMS Carlisle, Ceres and Hobart participated in shore bombardments. Hobart was attacked by three Italian fighters and sent its Walrus to attack an Italian headquarters at Zeila. The Walrus crew strafed Italian vehicles and dropped two 112 lb (51 kg) bombs.) Just before Wavell left Cairo to visit London for talks, reports of the size of the invasion force led him to order most of a field artillery regiment and two anti-tank guns of the 4th Indian Infantry Division to be sent from Egypt to Somaliland by special convoy. The Indian Army was asked to organise the first echelon of the 5th Indian Infantry Division for an infantry battalion, a field battery and a field company to be disembarked at Berbera. Anti-aircraft guns at Port Said were ordered to the colony but this decision was quietly countermanded two days later. Major-General Reade Godwin-Austen was appointed to command the enlarged force, with orders to defend the Tug Argan, defeat the Italian invasion and plan secretly to evacuate the defenders if it became necessary. Godwin-Austen reached Berbera on 11 July and took over command that evening; the reinforcements were too late and were diverted to Sudan.

=== Tug Argan position ===
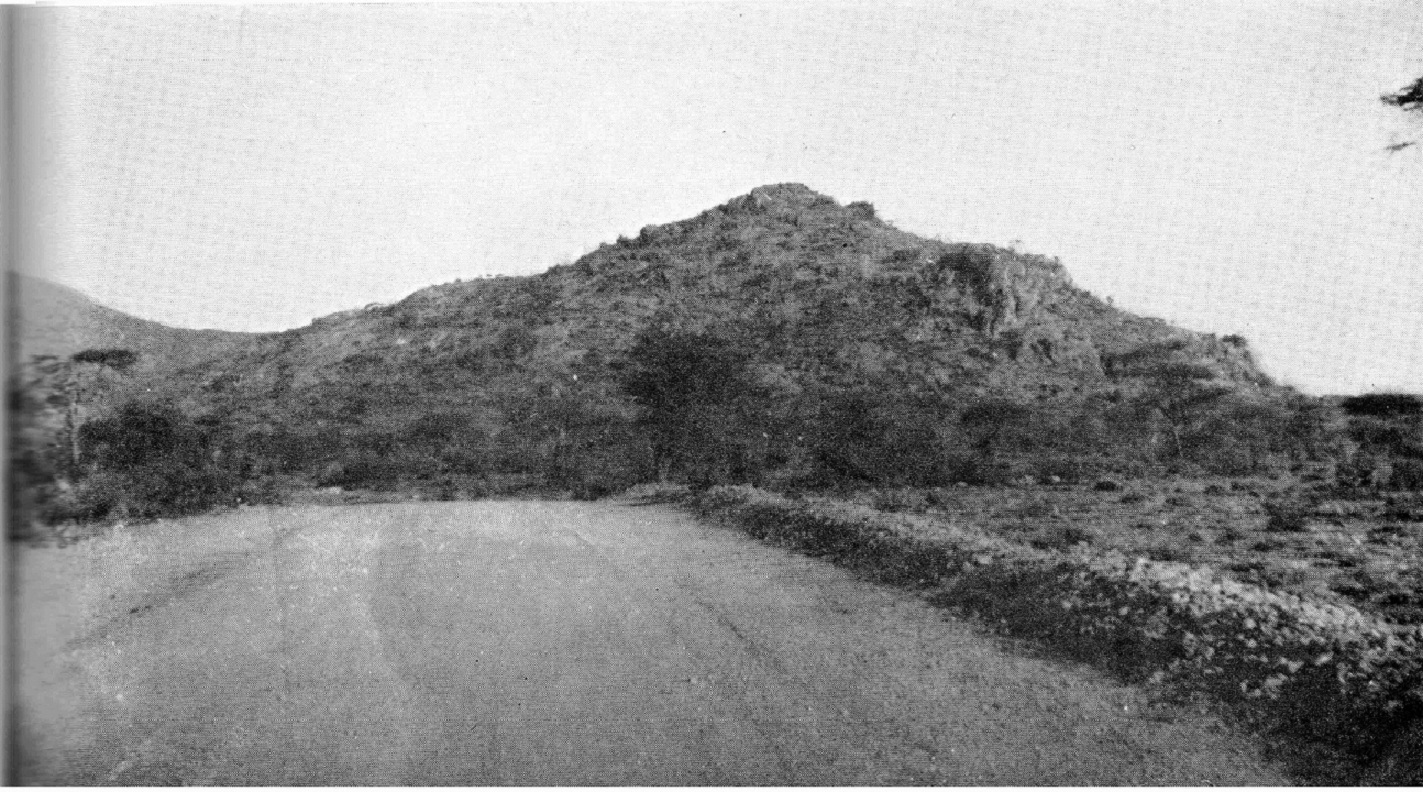
The Tug Argan Gap in 1954

From 7 to 8 August, the defenders had received reinforcements of the 1/2nd Punjab Regiment and the 2nd Battalion Black Watch; by 10 August, de Simone had closed up on the British positions behind the Tug Argan and prepared the Italian attack. The road from Hargeisa turns north through the Kerim Pass to Tug Argan and then east between the Assa hills to the south, hills and dry riverbeds (tugs) to the north. The pass is a flat stone expanse with occasional thorn bushes, tugs and a few rocky hills about 2,000 to 2,500 yd (1,800 to 2,300 m) apart, named Black, Knobbly, Mill and Observation hills by the defenders, with Castle Hill 2 mi (3.2 km) east of Mill Hill.

The positions had been fortified with machine-gun posts and a modest amount of barbed wire. The defences were impossible to by-pass and had good observation but with so little artillery, the advantage was dubious. The defenders were too few in number to cover the gap and the hills were far enough apart for an attacker to pass between them; only Castle Hill was behind the other fortified hill tops, providing little scope for defence in depth. There were several camel tracks through the Mirgo Pass 8 mi (13 km) from Black Hill and the Jerato Pass in the Assa Hills, which gave further opportunities for the Italians to exploit their numerical superiority. During the morning of 9 August, three Italian fighters strafed the airfield at Berbera but found only a damaged Blenheim. The aircraft were fired on by personnel at the base and the Australian cruiser Hobart in the harbour joined in with its machine-guns. The Gladiator damaged the day before was dismantled and taken to Aden. On 10 August the Italian northern column reached Zeila despite naval bombardments and bombing from aircraft flying from Aden; the column was eventually stopped by its vehicle tyres being damaged by the rough ground.

=== Battle of Tug Argan ===
Modern geographic map of Somaliland showing the coastal plain and hilly interior

The Australians from Hobart, with their Hotchkiss gun, arrived at dawn on 10 August but the gun had to be dismantled to load, which reduced its rate of fire to once every five minutes, while its 32 HE rounds and 32 solid shot lasted. The battle for Tug Argan began and another two CR 32 and a CR 42 were sent from Dire Dawa to Hargeisa along with a Ca 133 of 53° Squadriglia; five SM 79s from Addis Ababa were transferred to Dire Dawa. Early in the morning 8 Squadron sent three Blenheims to dive bomb Italian troops at Tug Argan, one being damaged by a CR 42. In the afternoon another three Blenheims bombed the village of Dubato; two of the Blenheims collided on the return journey and crashed in flames. On 11 August a morning attack was made by Six Ca 133s and three SM 81s on the Godojere Pass, a SM 81 being shot down by ground fire. Three CR 42s strafed Laferug and a SM 79 bombed the airstrip afterwards. A Blenheim was claimed shot down by Italian troops but no loss appeared in British records.

On 11 August, the Italians bombarded then attacked the west end of the Assa Hills at Punjab Ridge with a brigade of infantry, pushed back the defending company of the 3rd Battalion, 15th Punjab Regiment, then repulsed a counter-attack; attacks on Mill and Knobbly hills failed. At dawn a couple of Blenheims from 11 and 39 squadrons from Aden bombed Italian artillery around Darboruk against anti-aircraft fire then the 11 Squadron Blenheim was bounced by a CR 42 and damaged while the crew were trying to drop a message for British troops. The 39 Squadron machine was also attacked and made an emergency landing at Berbera. About two hours later three 39 Squadron Blenheims arrived to repeat the attack and the formation leader was attacked by a 410° Squadriglia CR 32. The pilot of the third Blenheim saw the attack, jettisoned bombs and attacked the Italian fighter, which made a head-on attack, wounding the Blenheim pilot and killed the observer. The pilot managed to reach Berbera and crash-land; the Italian pilot was also wounded. During the attack, a Blenheim IVF of 203 Squadron patrolled Berbera and tried to intercept three SM 79s but broke off the pursuit when a hit in the cockpit, wounded the pilot and navigator. Italian aircraft provided ground support all day, six Ca 133s bombing Mandera and Laferug.

On 12 August, all of the British positions were attacked simultaneously and by the evening Mill Hill, the least fortified position, had been captured after a determined resistance by troops of the Northern Rhodesian Regiment. Two of the East African Light Battery howitzers were lost and the Italians had established themselves in the Assa Hills, dominating the southern side of the gap. On 13 August, the defenders of Knobbly Hill defeated another attack but the Italians infiltrated down Mirgo Pass past the defended localities and ambushed a convoy carrying water and ammunition, which managed to fight its way through to Castle Hill. On 13 August the aircraft of CTSAO concentrated on the area to the east of Adadleh; the Jerato Pass was bombed by Ca 233s and the crashed Blenheims at Berbera were strafed twice by CR 32s, one on the second attack being hit by small-arms fire and landing inside British-held territory. Another three SM 81s were transferred from Shashamane (south of Addis Ababa) to Dire Dawa. Italian outflanking moves at Tug Argan led the British to begin a withdrawal to Berbera. Eleven 223 Squadron Wellesleys were sent to reinforce the RAF at Aden.

On 14 August, Castle Hill and Observation Hill were bombed and bombarded by artillery but an attack on Observation Hill failed. Mussolini signalled to Aosta,

Pour all available reserves into Somaliland to stimulate the operation. Order the entire Imperial air force to co-operate.

— Mussolini

Italian troops of the western column reported air attacks at Zeila and on a column advancing down the coast road towards Berbera, one bomber being claimed shot down but no losses appearing in RAF records. SM 79s attacked shipping off Bulhar, three SM 81s and three Ca 133s bombed a fort near the Godojere Pass and retreating troops on the road to Berbera, nearby. Three CR 32s attacked road transport at Laferug, Mandera and tracks to Berbera.

At Tug Argan a counter-attack towards Mirgo Pass by two companies of the 2nd KAR, had some success before it was forced back by Italian attacks. The Italians were close to positions from which they could cut off the defenders from their sole line of supply. The Italian advantage in artillery meant that the defended localities could be picked off piecemeal. After four days, the defenders were tiring and there was no better position to retreat to; an attempt to hold Berbara alone would be pointless. Godwin-Austen informed Henry Wilson, the GOC-in-C British Troops in Egypt, of the situation, concluding that further resistance at Tug Argan would be futile and likely to result in the loss of the force. Wavell had been called to London and arrived on 7 August but Wilson kept him informed of events, signalling his decision to order the evacuation of the colony to London with a few minutes. Wavell told Churchill who said that it could not be helped, then Wavell left to return to Cairo. Withdrawal would result in an estimated 70 per cent of the force being saved but if necessary the defenders would fight on. When it was clear that the attack towards Mirgo Pass had failed, sufficient troops were left, either to retrieve the situation or cover a withdrawal. Early on 15 August, Godwin-Austen signalled his conclusions to Wilson, who ordered him to withdraw from the colony. Godwin-Austin planned a slow retirement to Barkasan, about 33 mi (53 km) from Berbera, then to Nasiyeh, 17 mi (27 km) from the port. Over three nights, civilians then troops would be embarked, the time taken being determined by the monsoon, which usually made it difficult to reach ships by boat at night and before noon.

=== Retreat to Berbera ===
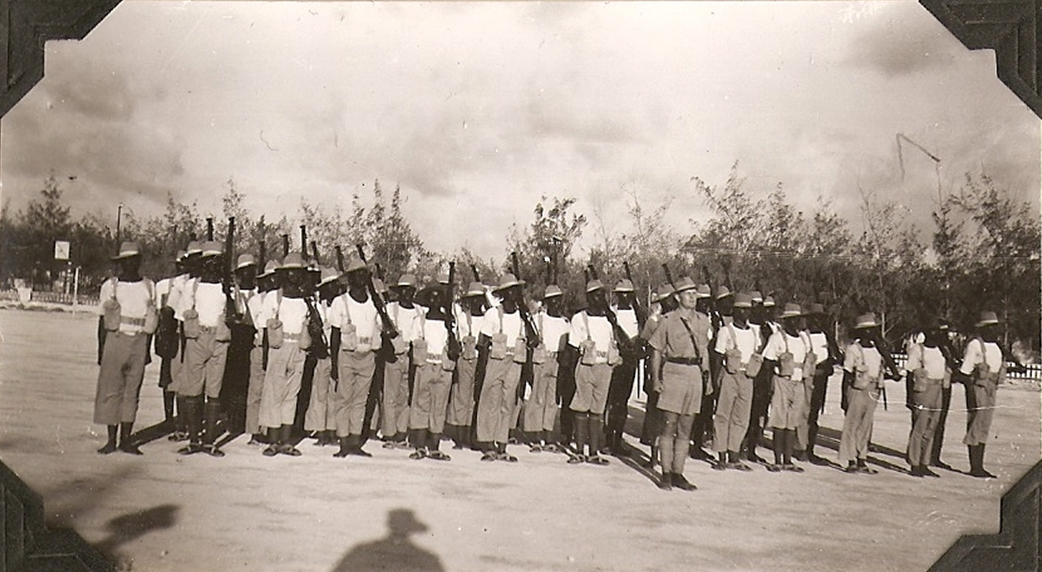
Kenyan troops from the 7th Battalion, King's African Rifles parading in Mogadishu, 1941

On 15 August, CTSAO bombers continued to fly sorties in support of the army. Three Ca 133s bombed around Laferug and three SM 79s bombed troops around Berbera. Six Blenheim I bombers flew from Iraq to reinforce the RAF at Aden and on passing Kamaran Island an SM 81 flew underneath the formation. The Blenheims dived on the bomber and three achieved firing positions, shooting it down. On landing the crews handed over their aircraft and returned to Iraq in Bombay transports the next day. After a long bombardment, the Italians overran Observation Hill and during the night the NRR retreated from Black, Knobbly and Castle hills. The Black Watch, two companies of the 2nd KAR and elements of 1/2nd Punjab Regiment formed a rearguard at Barkasan on the Berbera road, about 10 mi (16 km) behind Tug Argan and other troops moved back to Nasiyeh.

The CTSAO concentrated its operations against the port and in a dawn attack two SM 81 bombers attacked ships in the harbour and were damaged by anti-aircraft fire. Two SM 79s bombed at noon and one was also damaged by anti-aircraft fire. The third Italian raid, by three SM 79s met two Martin Marylands from the Free French flight in 8 Squadron, which were patrolling Berbera and one Maryland pilot claimed a SM 79 shot down; it was not confirmed but crashed in flames soon after. (Note: Not carrying wireless, the crew misunderstood hand signals from the other crews who could see smoke coming out of the aircraft. The SM 79 crew waved back but then the aircraft exploded and hit the ground near Sheikh, south of Berbera.) The CTSAO at Dire Dawa was reinforced by two SM 79s of 44° Gruppo and three CR 32s from 411° Squadriglia at Addis Ababa and three SM 81s from Shashamanna.

The retirement was followed up cautiously by the Italians, who attacked the defenders at Barkasan on 17 August. The Black Watch made several counter-attacks and repulsed the Italians but it was only a matter of time before the defences were outflanked. The evacuation at Berbera went more smoothly than expected and Godwin-Austen was able to withdraw the rearguard at Nasiyeh and once night fell, bring back the rearguard from Barkasan. Five Blenheims bombed the captured landing ground at Hargeisa and five Ca 133s with two CR 32 fighter escorts bombed the British residency at Sheikh. A 39 Squadron Blenheim on a reconnaissance sortie, was hit by ground fire and came down in the sea, the crew being rescued by the cruiser HMS Ceres. As the Italian invasion neared completion, three SM 81s of the 4° Gruppo went back to Shashamanna, two of the SM 79s of 44° Gruppo went back to Addis Ababa and three more SM 79s of 10° Squadriglia 28° Gruppo arrived from Gura in Eritrea after the 10° Squadriglia had exchanged it SM 81s from reinforcements of SM 79s being flown from Libya. In Aden 39 Squadron gave up two Blenheims to 11 Squadron so that each had five operational bombers.

=== Evacuation ===
The Royal Navy had built an all-tide jetty and had commenced evacuating civilian and administrative officials; on 16 August, the British started to embark troops. Attacks by the Regia Aeronautica on the British vessels in the Gulf of Aden and Berbera had begun on 8 August to little effect; Hobart was slightly damaged in two attacks and the auxiliary vessel Chakdina suffered splinter damage. On 17 August, the Italian western column at Bulhar, about 40 mi (64 km) west of Berbera, was engaged by the light cruiser Ceres and halted by gunfire. After dark, the rearguard was withdrawn to Berbera with minimal losses and loading was complete by the early hours of 18 August. At 05:35 on 18 August three 11 Squadron Blenheims bombed Italian vehicles near Laferug and were intercepted by two CR 32s of 410° Squadriglia, which shot down a Blenheim in flames. the crew parachuted but two of the men died in hospital of burns. Soon after the Blenheims took off, five Wellesleys from 223 Squadron flew from Perim Island and bombed Addis Ababa airfield in bad weather. A CR 42 managed to damage four of the Wellesleys whose crews claimed two hangars destroyed, two damaged, four SM 79s destroyed, two damaged and Aosta's runabout destroyed. Italian records show a SM 79, a S 75 and three Ca 133s destroyed, one SM 79 and a SM 81 damaged. Two attacks on Berbera were made by SM 79s during the morning and three SM 79s escorted by two CR 42s attacked soon after noon, the fighters driving a Blenheim F away. Italian troops overcame the second British defensive position before Berbera.

Before sailing for Aden early on 19 August, Hobart, with the force headquarters aboard, stayed behind to collect stragglers and complete the destruction of buildings, vehicles, fuel and stores. The tug Queen was the only British ship lost in the operation, scuttled by her crew on 18 August. Italian forces refloated the tug and renamed her Stella d' Italia, the only Italian naval ship south of Bab El Mandeb. The Royal Navy embarked 7,140 people, 5,690 of them front-line troops with 1,266 civilians and 184 sick. Most of the Somalis of the SCC were sent home to wait for the British to return, earlier plans for them to fight a guerrilla war being scrapped. SCC members who were embarked, became an armoured car unit under the same title. There was little Italian interference with the evacuation, perhaps because on 15 August Aosta had ordered Nasi to allow the British to evacuate without too much fighting, in the hope of a peace agreement being mediated through the Vatican. The last CTSAO raid was flown against Berbera by three SM 79s; soon afterwards, British aircraft from Aden attacked Italian troops as they occupied the town that evening. Much of Berbera was on fire and the wreckage of four British aircraft were found on the airfield. Mussolini annexed the colony to the AOI, as part of the Italian Empire.

== Aftermath ==
=== Analysis ===
Impero italiano (red); the maximum extent of the Italian Empire shown in purple

The Italians had shown the ability to coordinate columns separated by many miles of desert; the forces under British command had kept their discipline during the retreat and preserved most of their men. British Somaliland was annexed to Italian East Africa and Mussolini boasted that Italy had conquered a territory the size of England (British Somaliland, the border outposts of Karora, Gallabat, Kurmak and Kassala in Sudan and in Kenya, Moyale and Buna). News of the evacuation came as a shock to British public opinion but Wavell backed Godwin-Austen, saying that he had judged the situation correctly. The British had to immobilise and abandon 350 vehicles and most of their stores because of the need to ferry everything to the ships offshore.

From 5 to 19 August the RAF at Aden flew 184 sorties and dropped 60 long tons (61 t) of bombs. From 16 to 19 August, the RAF flew 12 reconnaissance sorties, 19 bomber-reconnaissance sorties, 72 bomber sorties against Italian troops and transport and 36 fighter sorties over Berbera. The British learned that inadequately defended airstrips could quickly be made untenable, leaving bombers flying from Aden unprotected against air attack. Despite the land campaign, a convoy sailed the Red Sea early in August and another convoy began the voyage on 19 August escorted by 14 Squadron Wellesleys as the Blenheim IVFs were busy over Berbera. After the British evacuation, both sides dispersed aircraft sent to reinforce the local units, the CTSAO being disbanded on 26 August.

Winston Churchill criticised Wavell for the loss of British Somaliland; because of the few casualties, Churchill thought that the colony had not been vigorously defended and proposed a board of inquiry. Wavell refused to co-operate and said that Godwin-Austen and Wilson had conducted a textbook withdrawal in the face of superior numbers. Wavell sent a telegram to Churchill which included the passage

...a big butcher's bill was not necessarily evidence of good tactics.

— Wavell

Churchill was said by General John Dill, the Chief of the Imperial General Staff (CIGS), to have been moved to "greater anger than he had ever seen him in before"; the incident was the beginning of the end for Wavell who was superseded by Claude Auchinleck in July 1941.

In 2016, Andrew Stewart wrote that given the exiguous nature of the British force in the colony, the defenders had done well to resist for as long as they had. The defence of British Somaliland took place during the Battle of Britain and the defeat could not be portrayed in heroic terms. Churchill was wrong to condemn Wavell and his subordinates but as Minister of Defence as well as Prime Minister, he could dictate consequences to defeated generals. Adolf Hitler called the evacuation of the colony a "hard blow" but

...all the British had lost was the privilege of maintaining an expensive garrison in their least valuable colony.

— Cowie War for Britain (1941) in Stewart (2016)

The capture of the colony was the greatest success of the Italians in the East African campaign but they were unable to exploit the opportunities that they had created. Delays caused by the terrain, weather and the cancellation of a coup de main by 300 Italian infantry on the port, had enabled the British to get away, despite the improvised nature of the embarkation.

=== Casualties ===
In 1954, Ian Playfair, the British official historian, wrote that the British suffered 260 casualties and estimated Italian casualties at 2,052 men. Seven British aircraft were shot down and ten were badly damaged in the fourteen days' fighting. In 1988, Alberto Rovighi, the Italian official historian, wrote that the Italians suffered 465 men killed, 1,530 wounded and 34 missing, a total of 2,029 men, of whom 161 were Italian and 1,868 were in local Eritrean and Somali Ascari units of the Regio Corpo di Truppe Coloniali. Somali irregulars supporting the British suffered about another 2,000 casualties during the invasion and occupation; about 1,000 Somali irregulars became casualties fighting on the Italian side. In 1993, Harold Raugh wrote that 38 of the British casualties had been killed and 222 wounded. In a 1996 publication, Christopher Shores gave the same figures for Italian casualties as Maravigna and wrote that the RAF lost seven aircraft and had ten damaged. In 2007, Andrea Molinari recorded 1,995 Italian casualties and four aircraft destroyed.

=== Recapture of Berbera ===
In January 1941, Wavell invaded Italian East Africa from Sudan and Kenya. On 16 March, a British amphibious force began Operation Appearance from Aden to recapture Berbera. The two Sikh battalions of the Indian Army that had been part of the defence force in August 1940 and a Somali commando detachment, landed on either side of Berbera from transports escorted by the cruisers HMS Glasgow and Caledon and the destroyers HMS Kandahar and Kingston. The invasion by the Sikhs was the first successful Allied landing on an occupied beach of the war; few men of the Italian 70th Colonial Brigade offered resistance. Repairs began on the port and supplies for the 11th African Division were passing through within a week, reducing the road transport distance by 500 mi (800 km). The British re-captured the rest of British Somaliland and on 8 April Chater was appointed Military Governor.

== See also ==
- Eric Charles Twelves Wilson, awarded the Victoria Cross for actions at Observation Hill
- List of British military equipment of World War II
- List of Italian Army equipment in World War II
- Military history of Italy during World War II
