= Somaliland Camel Corps =

- Logo of the Somaliland Camel Corps
- Active: 1914–1944
- Country: British Somaliland
- Allegiance: British Empire
- Branch: British Colonial Auxiliary Forces
- Type: Camel cavalry
- Headquarters: Laferug (Lafaruug)
- Engagements: Dervish War; Second Dervish expedition Third Dervish expedition Fifth Somaliland expedition 1922 Burao Tax Revolt; Italian conquest of British Somaliland; World War II: East African campaign; Burma campaign 1945 Sheikh Bashir Rebellion

Commanders
- Notable commanders: Hastings Ismay, 1st Baron Ismay; Eric Charles Twelves Wilson

The Somaliland Camel Corps (SCC) was a British Colonial Auxiliary Forces unit which was raised in British Somaliland. It existed from 1914 until 1944.

== Beginnings and the Dervish rebellion ==
In 1888, after signing successive treaties with the then ruling Somali Sultans, the British established a protectorate in northern present-day Somaliland referred to as British Somaliland. The British immediately recognized the affinity between the Somali people and their camel charges. The "Somali Camel Constabulary" was an early attempt to harness this natural affinity militarily.

In 1895, the haroun established the Dervish courts and Warfare commenced with colonial powers from 1900 until 1920.

== Dervish war ==
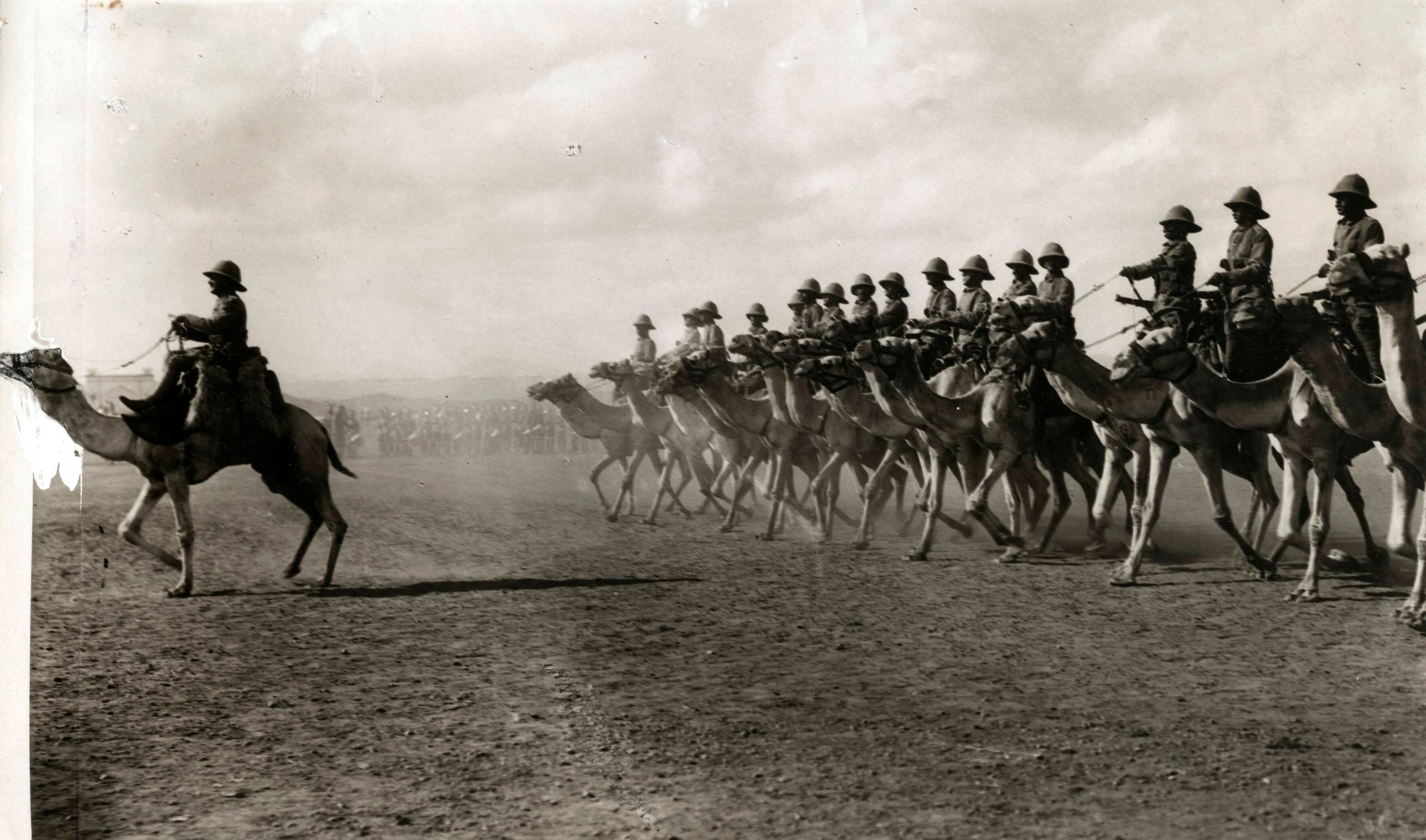
British camel troopers in 1913, between Berbera and Odweyne in British Somaliland.

On 9 August 1913, the "Somaliland Camel Constabulary" suffered a serious defeat at the Battle of Dul Madoba at the hands of the Ibraahin Xoorane and Axmed Aarey. Hassan, the emir of Diiriye Guure roamed British Somaliland, having already evaded several attempts at capture. At Dul Madoba, 57 members of the 110-man unit were killed or wounded, including the commander, Colonel Richard Corfield.

On 12 March 1914, the British set out to create what was to become the Somaliland Camel Corps, to maintain order in the protectorate. The corps served against the "Mad Mullah" but after four big expeditions to capture him, Hassan remained at large. During the same period, the corps set an impressive standard by covering 150 mi (240 km) in seventy-two hours. The SCC grew to include some 700 riders.

In November 1919, the British began the fifth expedition. In 1920, a combined land and air offensive defeated the Dervish army and occupied the capital, using the Somaliland Camel Corps, the 12 aircraft of Z Force Royal Air Force, Somaliland Police, elements from the 2nd (Nyasaland) Battalion and 6th (British Somaliland) Battalion of the King's African Rifles (KAR) and an Indian battalion.

During the Interwar years, the SCC was re-organised, better to defend the protectorate in the event of war. In 1930, Colonel Arthur Reginald Chater of the Royal Marines was placed in command of a slightly smaller corps of five hundred troopers. Like many other colonial units, the SCCs had British officers. In the late 1930s, the corps was given £900 to build pillboxes and reserve water tanks. After the financial crisis of 1931, the SCC numbered 14 British officers, 400 Somali Askaris and 150 African Reservists.

== World War II ==
In September 1939, the Somaliland Camel Corps had a total strength of fourteen British officers, one British non-commissioned officer, and 554 non-European (mostly ethnic Somalis) other ranks. Initially, the corps was placed under the garrison commander of French Somaliland. The four companies of the Somaliland Camel Corps were split among five different locations in the colony. Only "A" Company retained its camels, while the other companies had become infantry units.

Field Marshal Archibald Wavell, Commander-in-Chief of the Middle East Command, was appalled by the under-equipped force that was supposed to defend an entire colony. In 1940, as a result of his concern, the unit was partially mechanised and further defences were built. However, before the upgrades could be completed, the funding ceased.

At the beginning of the East African Campaign, the Somaliland Camel Corps, bolstered with a battalion of the Northern Rhodesian Regiment, had 1,475 men to defend British Somaliland. Reinforcements were eventually sent from Aden in a vain hope to stop the Italian invasion.

During the Italian conquest of British Somaliland, the Somaliland Camel Corps skirmished and screened the Italian attacking force along the border before pulling back to more defensible positions at the Tug Argan gap. During the Battle of Tug Argan, fought between 11–15 August when the Italian invaders attempted to force the positions, Camel Corps officer Captain Eric Charles Twelves Wilson of the East Surreys received the Victoria Cross (VC) for his use of a machine gun during the defence of Observation Hill. Despite wounds, malaria, and having several guns destroyed from under him, he stayed at his post. Wilson was the only VC recipient during the Italian invasion of British Somaliland; only six other VCs were awarded for operations in East Africa. Wilson was later found alive in an Italian prisoner of war camp.

The British were eventually forced to withdraw from Berbera on 17 August 1940. With the final withdrawal, most of the troops of the Somaliland Camel Corps were disbanded.

On 16 March 1941, less than one year from the date of withdrawal, the British returned to the colony. Soon afterwards the Somaliland Camel Corps was re-founded. By 18 April, the unit was at about 80% of its former strength. The Camel Corps spent the following months rounding up stray Italians and policing against local bandits. In 1942, the Somaliland Camel Corps became a mechanized regiment.

On 30 April 1944, six bombers of 61 Squadron, Royal Air Force, attacked and damaged the German submarine U-852 (Kapitänleutnant [Lieutenant-Captain] Heinz-Wilhelm Eck). He and 52 members of the crew came ashore, where members of the corps captured and interned them. For some time there were plans to send the Corps to Burma, however, they were disbanded in 1944 after several mutinies had taken place. It was succeeded by the Somaliland Scouts that year.

== Organization ==
In 1939, on the brink of war, the Somaliland Camel Corps was organized as follows:

- Headquarters and Headquarters Company, The Somaliland Camel Corps: Laferug (Lafaruug - located near Mandheera between Berbera and Hargeysa along Route 1 Highway)
- 'A' (Camel) Company: Hargeisa
- 'B' (Nyasa Infantry) Company: Tug Argan - southwest of Laferug near Hargeisa south of Assa Hills
- 'C' Company: Burao
- 'D' Company: Tug Argan (less 2 Platoons at Sheekh)

== Uniform ==
The troopers of the Somaliland Camel Corps had a distinctive dress which was based on the standard British Army khaki drill, but included a knitted woollen pullover and drill patches on the shoulders. Shorts were worn with woollen socks on puttees and "chaplis", boots or bare feet. Equipment consisted of a leather ammunition bandolier and a leather waist belt. The officers wore pith helmets and khaki drill uniforms. Other ranks wore a "kullah" with "puggree" which ended in a long tail which hung down the back. A "chaplis" is typically a colourful sandal. A "kullah" is a type of cap. A "puggree" is typically a strip of cloth wound around the upper portion of a hat or helmet, particularly a pith helmet, and falling down behind to act as a shade for the back of the neck.

== Notable servicemen ==
- Arthur Reginald Chater
- Hastings Ismay, 1st Baron Ismay
- Adrian Carton de Wiart
- Henry Howard
- Ismail Mahamed Ali
- Eric Charles Twelves Wilson
- Charles Doughty-Wylie
- Duncan Glasfurd
- David Smiley

== See also ==
- British Somaliland
- Somaliland Scouts
- Bikaner Camel Corps
- Sudan Defence Force
- King's African Rifles
- Camel cavalry
