= Battle of Tug Argan =

Part of the East African Campaign of the Second World War

- Part of The Italian invasion of British Somaliland, East African campaign of the Second World War
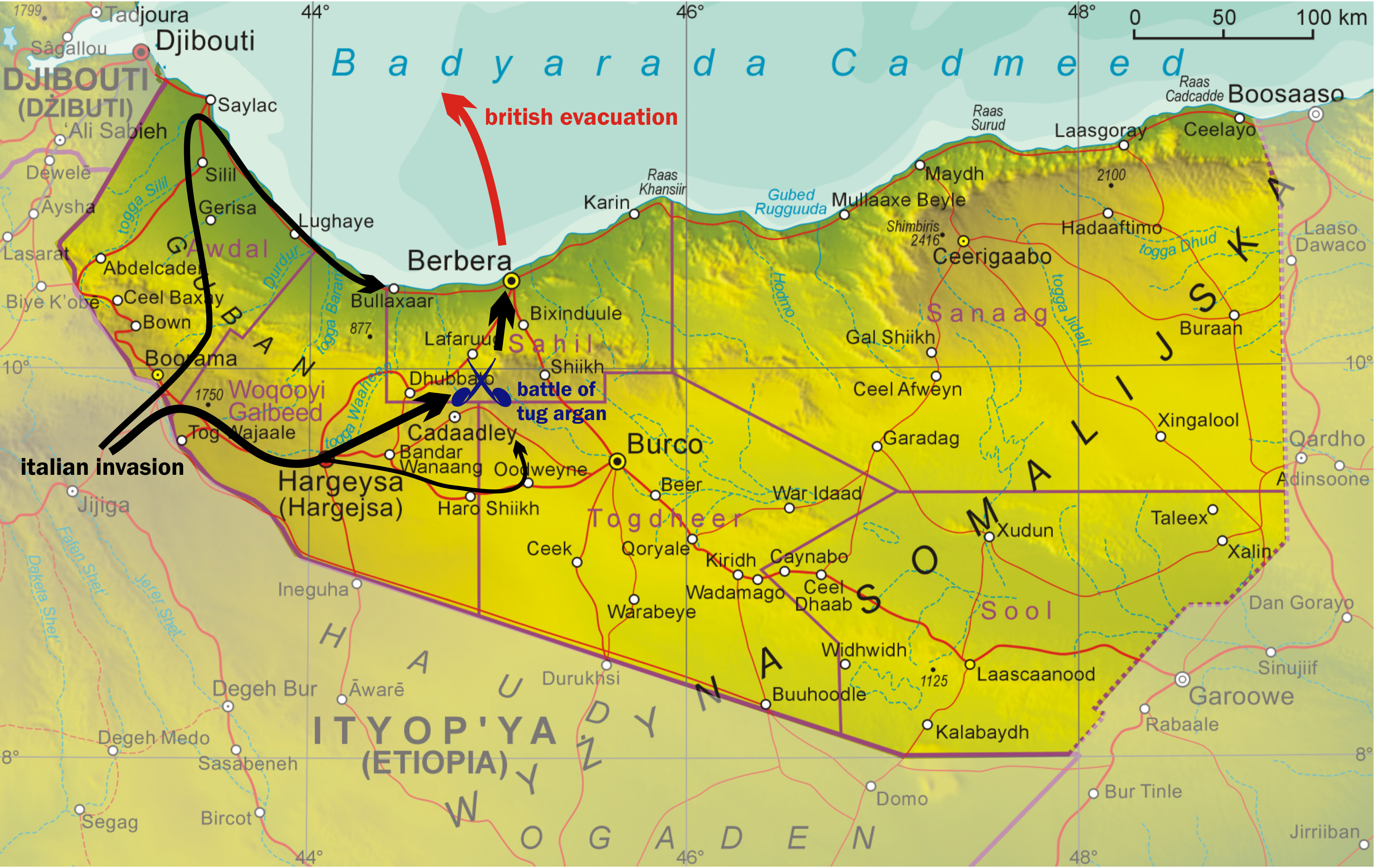
- Map depicting the Battle of Tug Argan and the British evacuation
Date	11–15 August 1940
Location	British Somaliland 09°57′30″N 44°27′27″E
Result	Italian victory

Belligerents
British Empire; British Raj; Southern Rhodesia	Italy

Commanders and leaders
Reade Godwin-Austen; Arthur Chater	Carlo de Simone; Guglielmo Nasi

Strength
5,000 regular and colonial infantry	30,000 Italian troops; Somali auxiliaries

Casualties and losses
38 killed; 102 wounded; 120 missing; 7 aircraft destroyed; 5 artillery pieces captured; 5 mortars captured	465 killed; 1,530 wounded; 34 missing

The Battle of Tug Argan was fought between forces of the British Empire and the Kingdom of Italy from 11 to 15 August 1940 in British Somaliland. The battle determined the result of the Italian invasion of British Somaliland in the East African Campaign of the Second World War.

Italian troops were advancing northwards on a north–south road toward the capital of Berbera through the Tug Argan gap, named after the dry river bed tug running across it, in the Assa hills, when they were confronted by a British garrison in fortified positions on hills across its breadth. Italian infantry, after four days of battle, overran the undermanned British positions and were able to seize the gap, compelling the defenders to withdraw to Berbera.

The Italian victory made the position of British forces in Somaliland untenable and the British colonial authorities evacuated the garrison by sea. Italy was able quickly to secure the territory, an achievement whose propaganda value to the Fascist regime was greater than its strategic importance.

== Background ==
Italy entered the war on 10 June 1940, towards the end of the Battle of France; Benito Mussolini, looked to Africa for easy conquests. The Somaliland Protectorate lacked resources, defenders and appeared vulnerable. Though Italy lacked the supply structure for a long war in the region, an expedition to Somaliland was authorised, set for late 1940. Italian forces in East Africa were relatively strong in numbers, if not in quality, with 29 colonial brigades, each comprising several infantry battalions and some light artillery, concentrated around the recently conquered Ethiopian capital, Addis Ababa. The Italians also possessed at least 60 light and medium tanks as well as 183 fighter aircraft, light and medium bombers.

The British were outnumbered and their exiguous colonial forces were dispersed around the Middle East, North and East Africa. With Cyrenaica and the Sudan under threat as well as Somaliland, only token units were available to control what was considered a relatively unimportant possession, devoid of infrastructure, productive capacity or natural resources. Until December 1939 British policy had been to abandon Somaliland if there was an invasion. General Archibald Wavell, the head of Middle East Command persuaded the Chiefs of Staff Committee that Somaliland should be defended. Five infantry battalions, the minimum force judged capable of defending the region, was assembled by the beginning of August. The defence force included two Sikh battalions and the 2nd King's African Rifles, which arrived by sea in from Aden. The Indian units, contrary to expectations, were composed of well-equipped and professional soldiers, a welcome reinforcement to the inexperienced Rhodesian troops.

Berbera, the capital of British Somaliland and its only big town and port, was the obvious destination of any invasion. As plans were made to defend the city, it became apparent that the border with Ethiopia was too long and open to be defended. The rugged Somali countryside was impassable by vehicles, meaning that the British could defend bottlenecks on the two roads to Berbera, which wound through the desert via the towns of Hargeisa and Burao, respectively. The Hargeisa road, the most direct route to the capital, was most easily blocked at the Tug Argan gap in the Assa hills. The pass was flat and open; a small force could not hold out for long against superior numbers but despite this topographical disadvantage, three battalions of the five and a light artillery battery were committed to the defence of Tug Argan with another battalion in reserve.

== Prelude ==
The strategic position of the British was undermined by the defeat in France and the French surrender on 22 June. British planners had anticipated fighting with the French, who controlled the western quarter of the Somali coast and had relinquished military control of the border regions adjoining the two protectorates. France had a larger garrison in Somaliland than Britain and could obtain reinforcements from Madagascar. Though the armistice had been signed at Compiègne, General Paul Legentilhomme, Commander-in-Chief of the French East African forces, announced that he would not join Vichy France in neutrality, proposing instead to continue the struggle from Djibouti. Le Gentilehomme was relieved of command by his superiors on 22 July and fled to Allied territory. His successor soon achieved détente with the Italians, leaving British Somaliland isolated.

On 3 August, General Guglielmo Nasi led 35,000 Italian troops, the vast majority of them African conscripts, across the border from their staging point at Harar into British Somaliland. The invaders were organised into three columns, one on the left, which would advance north to the coast at Zeila, a route recently vacated by the Vichy French, before turning east to Berbera; one on the right, which would make the opposite motion on the Burao road and a main central column, led by Carlo de Simone, containing the bulk of his forces. Simone was to capture the British positions at Tug Argan and make straight for Berbera, ending the campaign with a decisive battle. The Italians captured Hargeisa on 6 August, forcing the Somaliland Camel Corps (roughly of battalion strength) to withdraw. A few days of rest and rearmament ensued before the march was resumed on 8 August. The delay was extended by administrative inertia, as Italian officers complained of heavy rains and impassable roads. Following two days of probing, de Simone and his contingent reached the head of the Tug Argan gap and an initial assault was scheduled for 11 August. General Reade Godwin-Austen arrived to take command of the British garrison from the Military-Governor, Brigadier Arthur Chater, who retained control of the Tug Argan front.

== Battle ==
Geographic map of Somaliland

Holding Tug Argan was essential to halting an invasion and the British made its defence their priority, though diminished by the French change of sides. A unit of the Black Watch was rushed to the village of Laferug (to the rear of the gap) late on 10 August by truck and a brigade headquarters was established at nearby Barkasan. The defenders dug in across the broad arc of the gap. On the British right were three companies of the 3/15 Punjab Regiment, holding a group of southwest-facing strongpoints overlooking the rough wilderness beside the road. The British left was covered by another group of Indian troops, facing directly southward on Punjab Ridge.

The gap was manned by the more numerous Rhodesian infantry, on a line of knolls, named from north to south Black, Knobbly, Mill, Observation and Castle Hills, positioned in a ragged diagonal echelon with 2,000–2,500 yd (1.1–1.4 mi; 1.8–2.3 km) gaps between them across the mouth of the gap. Each was a miniature fortress, housing machine-gun nests surrounded by rings of barbed wire. Given that the front was far too wide for the troops available and the gaps between the hills too large, maintaining this balance in the face of superior numbers was a difficult task. The linear arrangement of the mounds denied the British position depth, increasing its vulnerability to penetration.

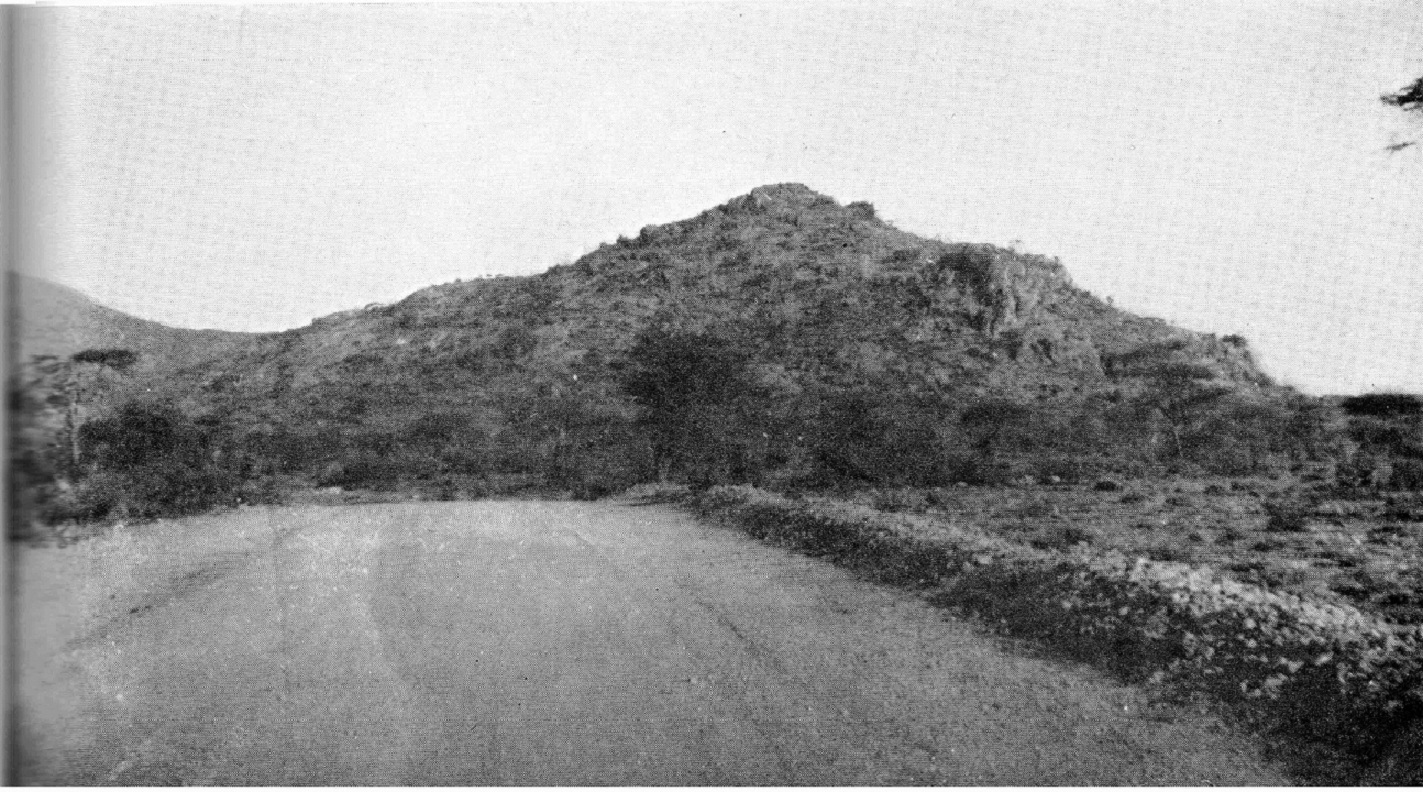
The Tug Argan Gap

On 10 August, the headlights of advancing Italian supply convoys were clearly visible and Somali refugees, fleeing before De Simone's column, crossed the Mirgo Pass on the British left. A K.A.R. patrol skirmished briefly with four Italian armoured cars but the exchange of fire terrified the British camels and forced their riders to flee. After receiving word from other scouts that the Italian tanks and infantry were easily avoiding the crude minefields laid before the creek, the British forces holding the forward trenches were withdrawn to the battle line. As this manoeuvre was nearing completion, Italian artillery and aircraft began to bombard the hills and parties of second-rate Ethiopian and Blackshirt troops attacked several times through the early evening. De Simone deployed his main forces opposite the British positions; on the Italian left, the II Brigade prepared to advance through the wilderness towards the Punjabi troops in the north. In the centre, the XIV Brigade faced the Rhodesian hilltop positions within the pass and the XV Brigade looked north towards Punjab Ridge on the Italian right. Behind them were XIII Brigade and the armoured vehicles.

The attack on the gap began at 7:30 a.m. on 11 August, as a flight of Savoia-Marchetti SM.81 medium bombers attacked Punjab Ridge, followed by an artillery bombardment lasting until noon. At 12:30 p.m., the infantry attack began; the II Brigade began moving slowly towards the Indians through the trackless wilderness north of the road, XIV Brigade attacked Mill, Knobbly and Observation Hills and XV Brigade ascended Punjab Ridge, engaging its defenders. The attacks of XIV Brigade against the Rhodesians failed but XV Brigade managed to drive the Indian defenders off Punjab Ridge. Counter-attacks were mounted against the Italians but these failed. The Italian attack on the hills was renewed the next day (12 August). The garrisons of Black, Knobbly and Mill Hills repulsed several attacks by XIV Brigade and the defence of the weakest of them, Mill Hill, began to crumble. By 4:00 p.m., the British defences were being overrun and after nightfall the British retreated from the hill, spiking their guns as they left.

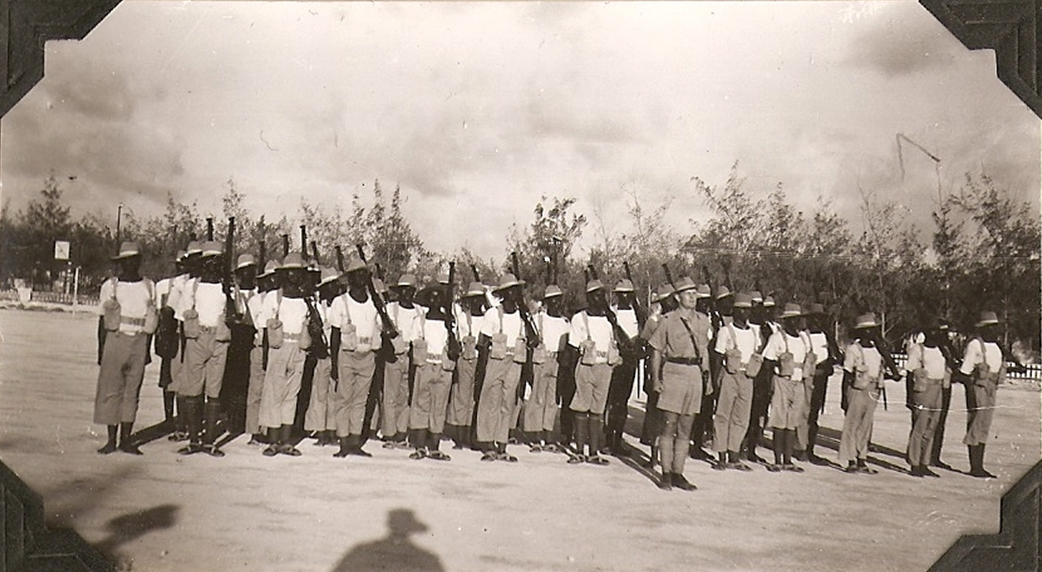
Kenyan troops of the King's African Rifles, who played a prominent role in the defence of Tug Argan

On 13 August the XIV Brigade attacks on the Rhodesian hilltop positions failed after some intense fighting, while II Brigade continued their trek through the wilderness toward the northern hills. XV Brigade began to infiltrate behind British lines, ambushing and dispersing a supply convoy. On 14 August, the XIV Brigade was relieved, after suffering many casualties, by the XIII Brigade. The fresh troops attacked Observation Hill but failed again, even after artillery bombardment throughout the day. The II Brigade had still failed to engage the Indians and XV Brigade made little progress before fending off a counter-attack from two companies of the 2nd King's African Rifles.

By 14 August, Godwin-Austen knew that the XV Brigade was encircling the position, his troops were exhausted and his artillery, some already abandoned to the Italians, were running low on ammunition. He informed General Henry Maitland Wilson, in command at Cairo, while Wavell was in England, that retreat from Tug Argan and evacuation from British Somaliland necessary. If his forces could be evacuated, perhaps 70 per cent of them might be removed or he could fight to the end or surrender. Wilson agreed to Godwin-Austen's request the next day and preparations were made to retreat after dark on 15 August. During that day, Observation Hill was attacked for the last time. De Simone had decided to continue the attack in the gap in lieu of completing the flanking manoeuvre and this final push succeeded. By 7:00 p.m., the XIII Brigade had seized Observation Hill, from which the British retreated in disarray. After dark, the defenders of the remaining hills were withdrawn, along with the Punjabis, who departed just as II Brigade was able to make inroads through their deserted positions. As the garrison retreated towards Berbera, the Italians occupied the Tug Argan Gap.

Following the battle, the Italians swiftly completed the investment of Berbera. To permit the main body of the colonial garrison to reach the coast, units of the Black Watch, 2nd Battalion King's African Rifles and the 1/2 Punjab Regiment formed a small rearguard at Barakasan, which fought into the night of 17 August. The Royal Navy had begun to evacuate troops from Berbera on 16 August, operations that few Italian aircraft flew against, possibly due to uncertainty about whether a peace treaty might be signed. By 19 August, all remaining British military forces, including the rearguard, the last of which had embarked late the previous day, had been evacuated by sea. An estimated 5,300–5,700 troops reached Aden. Italian forces, which had been held up by naval bombardment by HMS Ceres on 17 August, arrived in a Berbera on 19 August.

== Aftermath ==
=== Analysis ===
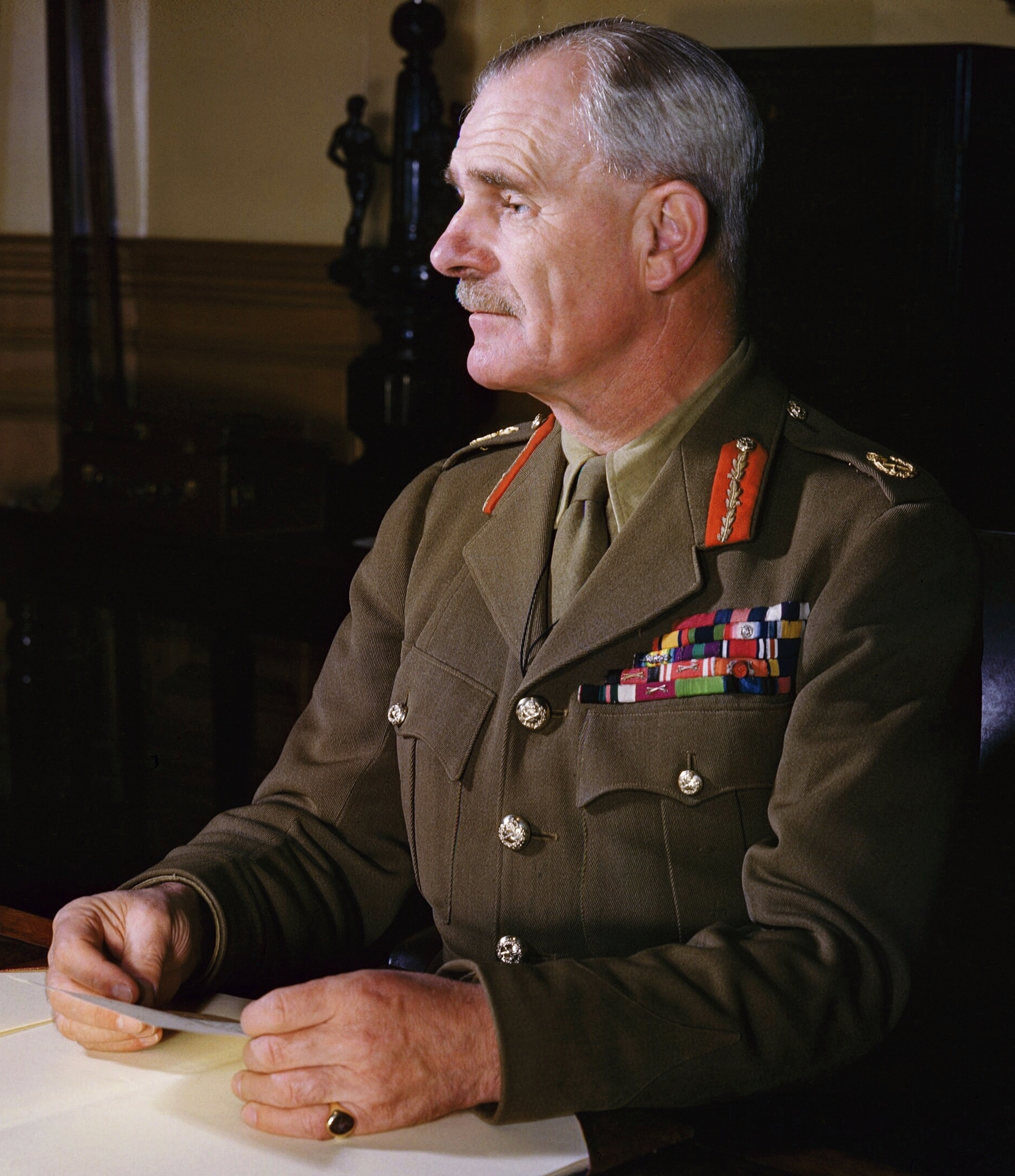
Archibald Wavell, whose reputation as one of Britain's finest officers suffered as a result of the retreat from Tug Argan

The Government Code and Cypher School (GC&CS) in England and the Cipher Bureau Middle East (CBME) in Cairo had gained information on the Italian order of battle and aspects of the Italian strategic assessment but had not been able to uncover Italian tactical decisions.

The retreat from Somaliland, despite the prudent conduct of local commanders, infuriated the British Prime Minister, Winston Churchill. Irritated by Mussolini's boasting, Churchill excoriated Wavell via cable, labelling the low casualty numbers on the British side a mark of blatant cowardice and demanding that Godwin-Austen be subjected to a board of inquiry. Wavell replied that "a big butcher's bill is not necessarily evidence of good tactics", further enraging Churchill and beginning the decline of Wavell's reputation in London.

Despite the emotional attachments professed by Allied and Axis leaders to the rule of Somaliland, few spoils changed hands after the Italian victory. Defeat was a blow to British prestige but the territory had little significance to imperial strategy. Britain gained financially after being relieved of the burden of providing a garrison. The impact could have been far greater if the Italians had managed to move faster after the battle. Heavy rains and difficulties supplying the troops hindered these efforts, removing any chance of a strategic victory.

=== Casualties ===
The British suffered casualties of 260, 38 killed, 102 wounded, and 120 missing; ten guns were left behind. In 1952, the Italian official historian wrote that Italian casualties were 16 officers killed and 46 injured, six NCOs killed, eleven wounded and one missing; metropolitan troops suffered 17 killed and 64 injured (161) and African troops suffered casualties of 426 killed, 409 injured and 33 missing (949). Regia Aeronautica losses were four aircraft shot down, 13 aircrew killed, 3 wounded and 7 missing, a total of 1,133 Italian casualties.

== See also ==
- Eric Wilson
- List of British military equipment of World War II
- List of Italian Army equipment in World War II

== Sources ==
- Hinsley, F. H.; et al. (1979). British Intelligence in the Second World War. Its influence on Strategy and Operations. History of the Second World War. Vol. I. London: HMSO. ISBN 978-0-11-630933-4 – via Archive Foundation.
- La Guerra in Africa Orientale, Giugno 1940 – Novembre 1941 [The War in East Africa: June 1940 – November 1941] (in Italian). Roma: Italia Stato maggiore dell'esercito Ufficio storico. 1952. OCLC 799948460.
- Mackenzie, Compton (1951). Eastern Epic: September 1939 – March 1943: Defence. Vol. I. London: Chatto & Windus. OCLC 59637091.
- Mockler, Anthony (2003). Haile Selassie's War. Signal Books. ISBN 978-1-902669-53-3.
- Moyse-Bartlett, Lieutenant-Colonel H. (2012). The King's African Rifles. Vol. II. Andrews UK Limited. ISBN 978-1-78150-663-9.
- Pitt, Barrie (2004). Churchill and the Generals. Barnsley: Pen and Sword. ISBN 978-1-84415-101-1.
- Playfair, I. S. O.; et al. (1954). Butler, J. R. M. (ed.). The Mediterranean and Middle East: The Early Successes Against Italy (to May 1941). History of the Second World War, United Kingdom Military Series. Vol. I. London: HMSO. OCLC 494123451. Archived from the original on 28 September 2018.
- Stewart, Andrew (2016). The First Victory: The Second World War and the East Africa Campaign. London: Yale University Press. ISBN 978-0-300-20855-9.
- Stone, Bill (1998). "The Invasion of British Somaliland". stone & stone: second world war books.
- Tucker, Spencer (2005). World War II. Santa Barbara, CA: ABC-CLIO. ISBN 978-1-85109-857-6.
- Wavell, A. (1946). Operations in the Somaliland Protectorate, 1939–1940 (Appendix A – G. M. R. Reid and A. R. Godwin-Austen). London: London Gazette. published in "No. 37594". The London Gazette. 4 June 1946. pp. 2719–2727.
