= Arthur Reginald Chater =

Major-General Arthur Reginald Chater CB CVO DSO OBE
- Born: 7 February 1896; Kensington, London, England
- Died: 3 January 1979 (aged 82); Colchester, Essex, England
- Military career
- Allegiance: United Kingdom
- Branch: Royal Marines
- Service years: 1913–1948
- Rank: Major-General
- Commands: Chatham Group Royal Marines (1946–48); Portsmouth Division Royal Marines (1943–44); Somaliland Camel Corps (1937–40); Sudan Camel Corps (1927–30)
- Conflicts: First World War; Second World War
- Awards: Companion of the Order of the Bath; Commander of the Royal Victorian Order; Distinguished Service Order; Officer of the Order of the British Empire; Mentioned in Despatches; Croix de guerre (France)

Major-General Arthur Reginald Chater CB, CVO, DSO, OBE (7 February 1896 – 3 January 1979) was an officer in the Royal Marines during the First World War, the interwar years, and Second World War.

== Military career ==
Chater was commissioned into the Royal Marines Light Infantry in 1913. He served in the First World War and saw action at Antwerp with the Chatham Battalion of the Royal Marine Brigade in 1914. He fought on the Gallipoli Peninsula in Turkey from 28 April to 12 May 1915, and in March 1918 he participated in the Allied raid on Zeebrugge. He was awarded the Distinguished Service Order (DSO) in July 1918, the citation for which appeared in The Edinburgh Gazette and reads as follows:

Was of the greatest assistance in keeping up communication between the various units of the battalion, and carried out his duties in a calm manner, which greatly contributed to the success of the operations. Gave great assistance in the preparation of the plan for the assault.

During the interwar period Chater served with the Egyptian Army and the Sudan Camel Corps. He became Commanding Officer of the Sudan Camel Corps in 1927, Commander of military operations in Kordofan in Sudan in 1929 and Senior Royal Marines Officer at the East Indies Station in 1931. He served in the Second World War as Military-Governor of British Somaliland from 1941, whose evacuation he oversaw following the Battle of Tug Argan, as Commander of the Portsmouth Division of the Royal Marines from 1943 and as Director of Combined Operations for India and South East Asia from 1944.

Papers related to his service are held in the Liddell Hart Centre for Military Archives, King's College London, and comprise notes on Operation Lightning for the capture of Akyab Island, Burma, on 3 January 1945; photographs of amphibious landings by 15 Indian Corps at Kangaw, Burma, January 1945; and notes on combined operations training of allied forces for Operation Zipper, the planned invasion of Malaya, August 1945.

Having been made a Companion of the Order of the Distinguished Service Order, he became Commander of the Chatham Group of Royal Marines in 1946 and retired in 1948.

A road on the site of the former Royal Marine Infirmary Barracks in Deal, Kent, which was built in 1900 and demolished c.1990 was named Chater Court.

== Honours ==
Chater was made a companion of the Order of the Bath, a commander of the Royal Victorian Order, and a member of the Order of the British Empire.

== Honours and awards ==
- Companion of the Order of the Bath – January 1941
- Commander of the Royal Victorian Order – June 1966
- Distinguished Service Order – July 1918
- Officer of the Order of the British Empire – June 1931
