= Vehicle registration plates of Ethiopia =

Ethiopia requires its residents to register their motor vehicles and display vehicle registration plates. Current plates feature Ge'ez text.

Image	First issued	Design	Slogan	Serial format	Serials issued	Notes
	1950s			AB 12345		Addis Ababa
	1980-1989			4 A/B 12345		Government owned vehicle
	2000s			1 AB over 12345		Addis Ababa
	2002-2026			1 AB 123456		Addis Ababa
	2026-			1 AB 123456		Private

== Italian Africa (1913-1941) ==
The very first Italian registration plates, from 1913 to the end of the 1920s, were rectangular, with a white background and with the name or initials of the colony in red followed by the registration number, on a single line, but the documentation on this is fragmentary. For the Italian colonial troops, however, special military service plates were used with the initials SOM (Somalia) or T (Tripolitania) in front. Subsequently, until 1935, the Italian colonies used white plates on black with a colonial code on the first line, and up to 5 numbers on the second line. The numbers, in relief, were assigned serially and the plates were made of metal, with the fasces as a seal. The colonial codes were:

- ERITREA, later ER for Eritrea
- SOMALIA, later SOM for Somalia
- TRIPOLI for Tripolitania
- CNA for Cyrenaica

Between 1937 and 1941 there was an Italian governorate in Ethiopia and in those years a new type of Italian license plate was issued. They were exactly the same as the previous ones, but they had three squares on the left, colored top to bottom green, white and red, like the Italian flag, with the letters AOI (Africa Orientale Italiana) for Italian East Africa inside. The front plates resembled standard Italian front license plates, as these were smaller, and only sometimes had the colored squares like the rear license plates. The abbreviations used to indicate the origin are:

- AA for Addis Ababa
- AM for Amara
- ER for Eritrea
- OS for OROMO e Sidama
- HA for Harrar
- SC for Scioà
- SOM for Somalia

== Diplomatic Plates ==
On vehicles of the diplomatic corps, the coding also consists of two numbers, and another four numbers. The plates would be coloured black letters on a white background. The first two or three numbers indicate a country or organization as listed in the table below.

Ethiopia Diplomatic License Plate 04 - United States

Diplomatic Code	Country
01	Italy
02	France
03	United Kingdom
04	United States
05	Belgium
06	Turkey
07	Egypt
08	Greece
09	Czech Republic
10	Russia
11	Sweden
12	India
13	Yugoslavia
14	Germany
15	Netherlands
16	Yemen
17	Mexico
18	Saudi Arabia
19	Switzerland
20	Sudan
21	Vatican
22	Bulgaria
23	Japan
24	Liberia
25	Ghana
26	Spain
27	Poland
28	Somalia
29	Iran
30	Nigeria
31	Malawi
32	Senegal
33	Zaire
34	Tanzania
35	Indonesia
36	Austria
37	South Korea
38	Malaysia
39	Burundi
40	Zambia
41	—
42	Morocco
43	Finland
44	Thailand
45	Hungary
46	Canada
47	Ivory Coast
48	Cameroon
49	Kenya
50	Equatorial Guinea
51	Venezuela
52	Sierra Leone
53	Rwanda
54	Guinea
55	Jamaica
56	China
57	Mali
58	Uganda
59	Argentina
60	—
61	Pakistan
62	Gabon
63	Libya
64	Romania
65	—
66	Cuba
67	Niger
68	North Korea
69	Algeria
70	Vietnam
71	Djibouti
72	Zimbabwe
73	Congo
74	Chad
75	Mozambique
76	Australia
77	Tunisia
78	Afghanistan
79	Nicaragua
80	—
81	Palestine
82	Angola
83	Iraq
84	Israel
85	Madagascar
86	Norway
87	Namibia
88	Mali
89	—
90	Eritrea
91	Ireland
92	South Africa
93	Lesotho
94	Mauritius
95	Kuwait
96	Burkina Faso
97	Botswana
98	Cape Verde
99	Togo
100	Portugal
101	Gambia
102	Benin
103	Mauritania
104	Ukraine
105	Denmark
106	—
107	Brazil
108	Slovakia
109	United Arab Emirates
110	League of Arab States
111	South Sudan
112	Luxembourg
113	Comoros
114	Georgia
115	Seychelles
116	Qatar
132	Armenia
