= Italians of Ethiopia =

Italian community in Ethiopia

Italo-etiopi (Italian)
- (Italy) (Ethiopia)
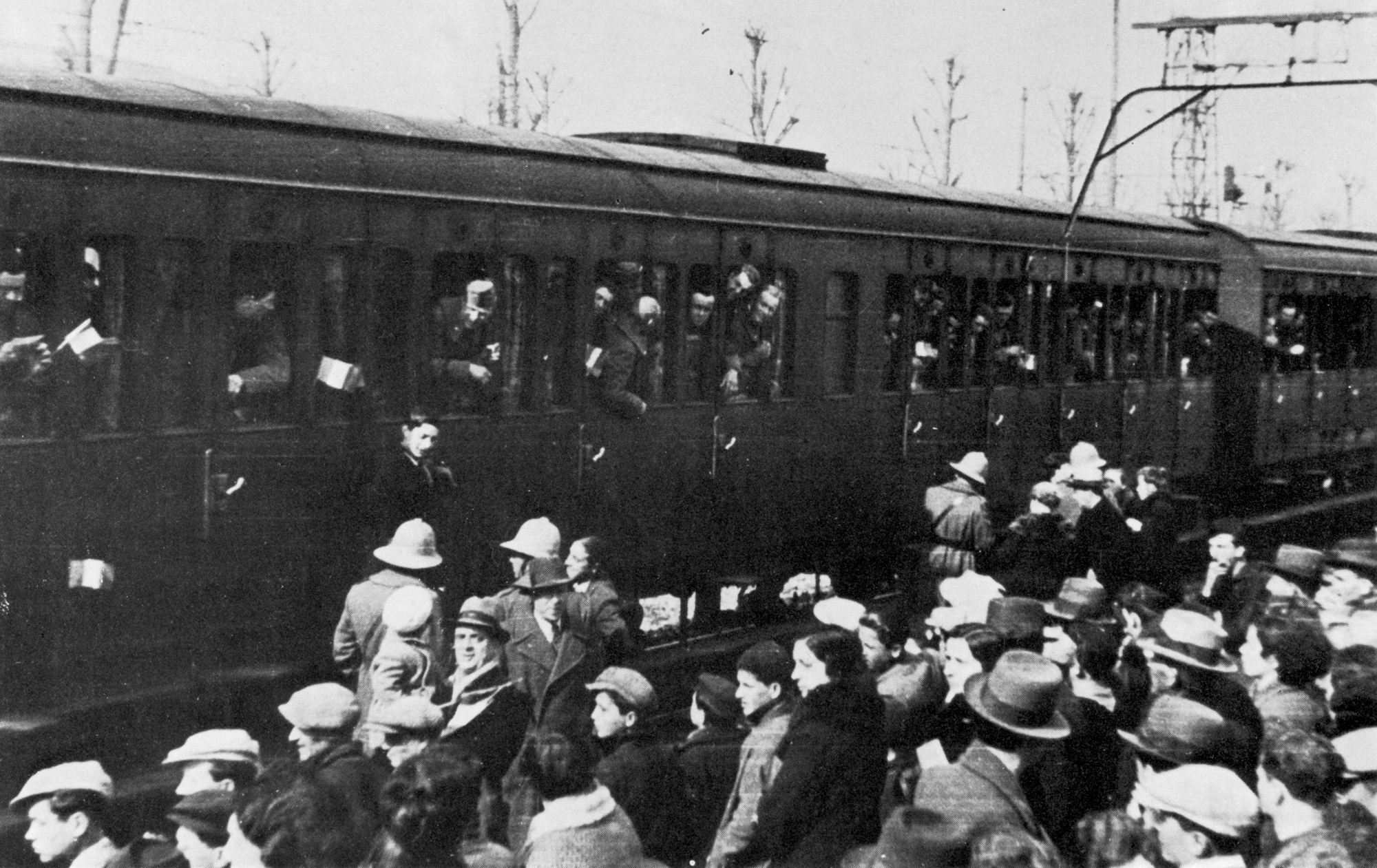
- Italian soldiers leaving for Ethiopia in 1935

Total population
- 1,400 (plus 2,000 descendants)

Regions with significant populations
- Addis Ababa, Gondar, Harar and Dire Dawa.

Languages
- Italian, Amharic and other Languages of Ethiopia

Religion
- Christianity, mostly Roman Catholic, minority of Ethiopian Orthodox Tewahedo Church.

Related ethnic groups
- Italians, Italian Algerians, Italian Angolans, Italian Egyptians, Italian Eritreans, Italian Libyans, Italian Moroccans, Italian Mozambicans, Italian Somalis, Italian South Africans, Italian Tunisians, Italian Zimbabweans

Italians of Ethiopia (Italian: Italo-etiopi, also called Italian Ethiopians,) are Ethiopian-born citizens who are fully or partially of Italian descent, whose ancestors were Italians who emigrated to Ethiopia starting in the 19th century during the Italian diaspora, or Italian-born people in Ethiopia.

Most of the Italians moved to Ethiopia after the Italian conquest of Abyssinia in 1936. Italian Ethiopia was made of Harrar, Galla-Sidamo, Amhara and Scioa Governorates in summer 1936 and became a part of the Italian colony Italian East Africa, with capital Addis Ababa. and with Victor Emmanuel III proclaiming himself Emperor of Ethiopia.

== History ==
The 1880s were marked by the so-called "Scramble for Africa" and the Berlin Conference of 1884–85. When the Italians began to vie with the British and French for influence in the area. Asseb, a port near the southern entrance of the Red Sea, was bought by in March 1870 from the local Afar sultan, vassal to the Ethiopian Emperor, by an Italian company, which by 1890 led to the Italian colony of Eritrea being established. From then on, the Kingdom of Italy had traded and set up large tracts of farm land up to the borders with Ethiopia. As the Italian colonists moved further inland from the agreed upon borders of Eritrea which had been agreed upon in the Treaty of Wuchale, Emperor Menelik II saw this as an invasion less than a few decades, and support for the war was minimal, especially among Southern Italians who were forcibly conscripted. Anti-war riots and demonstrations broke out across Italy and in the city of Pavia the population came out to blockade the railroad to prevent Italian troops from leaving for Ethiopia. Many Italian prisoners of war were treated very well, and many given over to noble families for work on their estates, while others with specialized skills were used in the construction of the newly formed capital of Addis Ababa, such as St George's Cathedral. Italy and Ethiopia signed a provisional treaty of peace on 26 October 1896.

Conflicts between the two countries resulted in the Battle of Adwa in 1896, whereby the Ethiopians defeated Italy and remained independent, under the rule of Menelik II. At the time, Italy had only been unified fon to expand the African colonial possessions of Italy in the 1930s. In October 1935, Mussolini launched the Second Italo-Abyssinian War and invaded Ethiopia. Emperor Haile Selassie went exile to avert the genocide in the hands of Italians in war and appeal to the society of the nations the Ethiopian capital of Addis Ababa on 2 May 1936 and the Fascists entered the city on 5 May, after several bloody battles which included the Fascist army's use of mustard gas in battle against the Geneva Protocol of 1929 (of which Italy was a signatory).

Map of Italian East Africa after Italy's annexation of Ethiopia

Victory was announced on 9 May 1936 and Mussolini declared the creation of the "Italian Empire". The Italians merged Eritrea, Italian Somalia, and newly occupation Ethiopia into Italian East Africa (Africa Orientale Italiana, A.O.I.). Among the war crimes committed under the orders of Mussolini was the robbing of one of the so-called Axum Obelisks(properly termed a 'stele' or, in the local Afro-Asiatic languages, hawelt/hawelti as its form is not topped by a pyramid).

The Italian King Victor Emmanuel III added Emperor of Ethiopia to his titles, a title not welcomed by the many nations that were part of the society of the nations.

From 1936 to the start of World War II Mussolini controlled much of Ethiopia, but a guerrilla war raged in areas of Ethiopia still controlled by Ethiopian resistance fighters linked to Haile Selassie (who was exiled in Great Britain) and the royal family remaining in Ethiopia, including the efforts of Ras Imru Haile Selassie who was captured on December 19, 1936 and taken to prison on the Island of Ponza until freed after the Armistice of Cassibile

== Italian occupation ==
Since 1 June 1936 Italian Ethiopia was part of the newly created Italian East Africa, and was administratively composed of four governorates: Amhara, Harar, Galla-Sidamo and Scioa. The Scioa Governorate was originally known as the Addis Abeba Governorate, but enlarged in November 1938 with parts of the neighboring governorates of Harar, Galla-Sidamo, and Amhara. Each Governorate was under the authority of an Italian governor, answerable to the Italian viceroy, who represented the Emperor Victor Emmanuel III.

Italian Ethiopia had an area of 790,000 square kilometres (305,000 sq mi) and a population of 9,450,000 inhabitants, resulting in a density of 12 inhabitants per square kilometre (31/sq mi)

Governorate	Capital	Total population	Italians	Car Tag	Coat of Arms
Amhara Governorate	Gondar	2,000,000	11,103	AM	
Harrar Governorate	Harar	1,600,000	10,035	HA	
Galla-Sidamo Governorate	Jimma	4,000,000	11,823	GS	
Scioa Governorate	Addis Ababa	1,850,000	40,698	SC	

Only 3,200 Italian farmers moved to colonize rural areas, mainly because of the threat of violence from the Arbegnoch, who controlled as much as 1/10 of the Ethiopian Highlands in 1940.

There was substantial investment in Ethiopian infrastructure development, with the budget for AOI from 1936 to 1937 requiring 19,136 billion lire when the annual revenue of Italy was only 18,581 billion lire. Some fascist politicians (like De Vecchi) complained in 1943 that Italy should have spent all this huge amount of money to modernize the italian army for the coming WW2, and so face the Allies better prepared.

This infrastructure development was part of a plan to bring half a million Italians to colonize the Ethiopian plateaus. The Italians created the "imperial road" between Addis Ababa and Massaua, the Addis Ababa – Mogadishu and the Addis Ababa – Assab.

The Imperial Line from Rome to Addis Ababa

Italians also created new airports and in 1936 started the worldwide famous Imperial Line, a flight connecting Addis Ababa to Rome. The line was opened after the Italian conquest of Ethiopia and was followed by the first air links with the Italian colonies in Italian East Africa, which began in a pioneering way since 1934. The route was enlarged to 6,379 km and initially joined Rome with Addis Ababa via Syracuse, Benghazi, Cairo, Wadi Halfa, Khartoum, Kassala, Asmara, Dire Dawa. There was a change of aircraft in Benghazi (or sometimes in Tripoli). The route was carried out in three and a half days of daytime flight and the frequency was four flights per week in both directions. Later from Addis Ababa there were three flights a week that continued to Mogadishu, capital of Italian Somalia.

== After World War II ==
After WWII, some Italian Ethiopians remained in the country, until the overthrow of the Emperor Haile Selassie in the Ethiopian Civil War in 1974; nearly 22,000 Italo-Ethiopians took refuge in Italy during the 1970s. Their main organization in Italy is the Associazione Italiana Profughi dall'Etiopia ed Eritrea (A.I.P.E.E.).

=== Contemporary relations ===
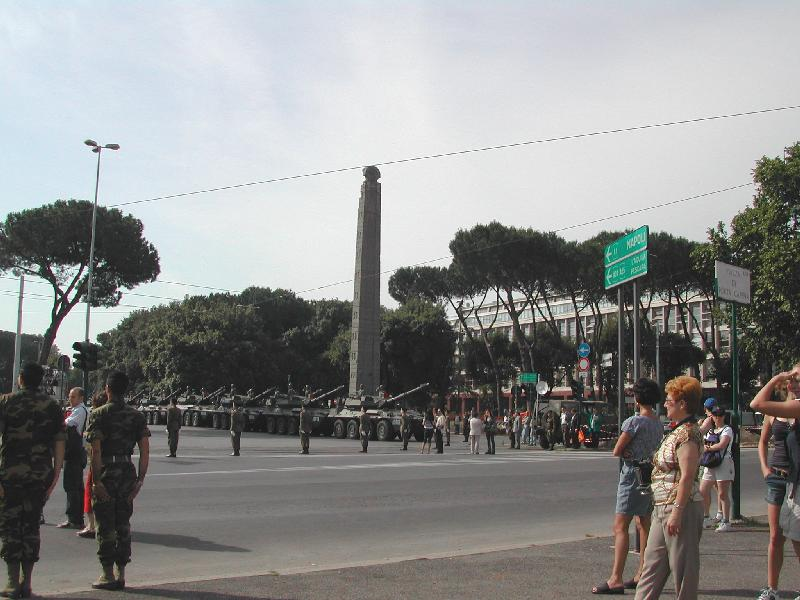
The Obelisk of Axum in Rome in 2002, before its repatriation.

In the mid-1990s despite a previous arrangement with the Dergue regime under Menghistu in the 1970s to cede the Obelisk of Axum to Italy in exchange for medical facilities and forgiving an accumulated debt to the Italian government, a populist movement made up of Italians and Ethiopians (both in country and expatriates around the world) began to petition the then current Italian government to return the obelisk, an event which eventually culminated in its repatriation in 2005 to Axum, the city of its creation.

In the 2000s, some Italian companies have returned to operate in Ethiopia, and a large number of Italian technicians and managers arrived with their families, residing mainly in the metropolitan area of the capital. In 2010, there were over 2,000 Ethiopians of Italian descent, while there were around 1,400 Italian citizens, sometimes nicknamed pejoratively Solati and yä‑hulätt bandira lǝǧ.

Ethiopia has the largest concentration of Italian schools and cultural institutes in Africa (such as the Scuola Statale Italiana of Addis Abeba), which foster and promote Italian and Ethiopian culture and are free to the public. The Italian firm Salini Costruttori was chosen by the Ethiopian government to design and build the Millennium or Renaissance Dam on the Blue Nile river which when completed will be the largest dam and hydroelectric plant in Africa. As the Italian engineers had helped to build the first railway from Addis Ababa to Djibouti in the past, the Ethiopian government has contracted them again to expand the railroad network. For the last 20 years Italy has continued to be among the top 5 trading partners with Ethiopia and a major investor in the Ethiopian economy.

== Notable immigrants ==
- Luciano Violante, judge and politician
- Luciano Vassallo, Ethiopian footballer and coach of Eritrean and Italian origin
- Italo Vassallo, footballer of Ethiopia national team
- Gabriella Ghermandi, writer and singer
- Rosa Dainelli, doctor

== See also ==
- Italian Ethiopia
- Italian Empire
- Italian East Africa
- History of Ethiopia
- Ethiopia–Italy relations
- Ethiopians in Italy

== Bibliography ==
- Antonicelli, Franco. Trent'anni di storia italiana 1915 - 1945. Mondadori ed. Torino, 1961
- Blitzer, Wolf. Century of War. Friedman/Fairfax Publishers. New York, 2001 ISBN 1-58663-342-2
- Del Boca, Angelo. Italiani in Africa Orientale: La conquista dell'Impero, Laterza, Roma-Bari 1985. ISBN 8842027154
- Del Boca, Angelo. Italiani in Africa Orientale: La caduta d'Impero, Laterza, Roma-Bari 1986. ISBN 884202810X
- Labanca, Nicola. Oltremare. Storia dell'espansione coloniale italiana. Il Mulino. Bologna, 2007. ISBN 8815120386
- Rosselli, Alberto. Storie Segrete. Operazioni sconosciute o dimenticate della seconda guerra mondiale. Iuculano Editore. Pavia, 2007.
- Sbiacchi, Alberto. Hailé Selassié and the Italians, 1941-43. African Studies Review, vol.XXII, n.1, April 1979.
