= Somalia Governorate =

Former governorate of Italian East Africa

Somalia Governorate Governatorato della Somalia
- Governorate of Italian East Africa
- Coat of arms

- Somalia (green) within Italian East Africa
- Capital: Mogadishu
- Population
- ca. 1,150,000
- Government
- Governor
  - 1936–1937: Ruggiero Santini
  - 1937–1940: Francesco Caroselli
  - 1940–1941: Gustavo Pesenti
  - 1941: Carlo De Simone
- Historical era: Interwar period World War II
  - Created: 1 June 1936
  - British Somaliland annexed: 19 August 1940
  - British occupation: 25 February 1941
Preceded by
Italian Somalia
Ethiopian Empire
British Somaliland
Succeeded by
British Military Administration (Somaliland)
Ethiopian Empire
British Somaliland

Somalia Governorate was one of the six governorates of Italian East Africa. It was formed from the previously separate colony of Italian Somalia, enlarged by the Ogaden region of the conquered Ethiopian Empire following the Second Italo-Ethiopian War.

== History ==
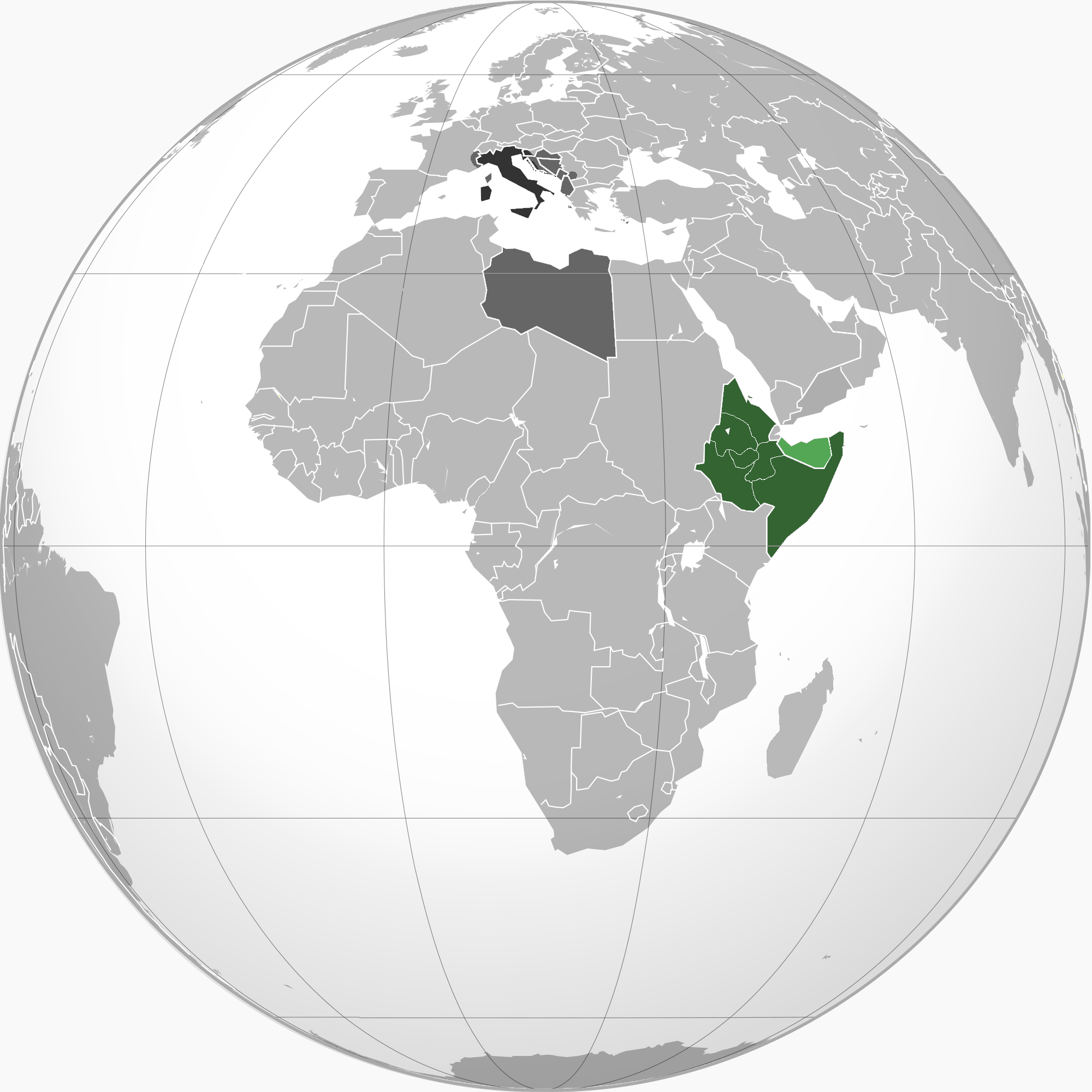
Italian East Africa in green. British Somaliland (light green) was annexed in 1940.

The Somalia Governorate lasted from 1936 until 1941. Its administrative capital was Mogadishu. In 1936, the capital had a population of 50,000 inhabitants, of which nearly 20,000 were Italian Somalis.

By 1941, 30,000 Italians lived in Mogadishu, representing around 33% of the city's total 90,000 residents. They frequented local Italian schools that the colonial authorities had opened, such as the "Liceum".

The Italian authorities in 1937 began construction of a paved highway from Mogadishu to Addis Ababa, which was nearly completed in 1941. Other roads were started in 1939, from Mogadishu to the northern Somali coast and to the British Kenya Colony to the south.

Additionally, there was a project to connect Mogadishu with the Addis Ababa-Djibouti railway, and another to start the construction of an airport on the outskirts of the city. The ports of the capital and of Kismayo further south were also slated for enlargement in 1941. However, the outbreak of World War II put a halt to these plans.

From 1936 the Mogadishu port started to have a weekly international ship line for passengers, connecting Italian Mogadiscio with Massaua in Eritrea and Genova in Italy with the Italian Lloyd Triestino and Italian Line. The MS Vulcania was a transatlantic ship that served the port of Mogadiscio. Later, in 1941 the port was damaged by British bombings during World War II.

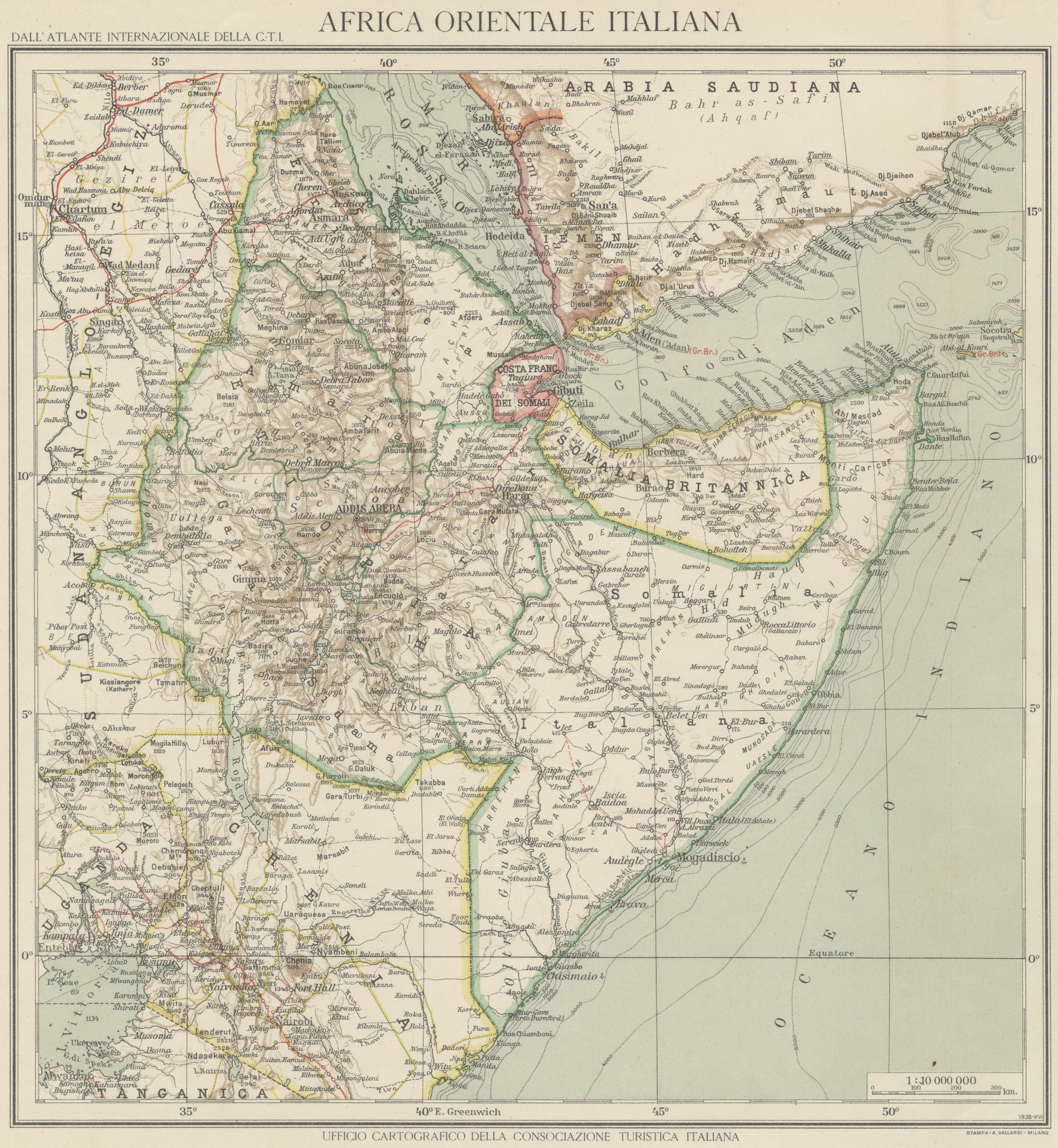
1938 Italian Somalia (enlarge to see detailed map)

The colony in the late 1930s was one of the most developed in all Africa in terms of the standard of living of the colonists and of the local inhabitants, mainly in the urban areas like the capital and Genale & Villaggio Duca degli Abruzzi. Also a car race circuit was created in the capital: the colonial-era famous Mogadiscio circuit.

By 1940, the Villaggio Duca degli Abruzzi (called also "Villabruzzi"; currently Jowhar) had a population of 12,000 people, of whom nearly 3,000 were Italian Somalis, and enjoyed a notable level of development with a small manufacturing area with agricultural industries (sugar mills, etc.).

The biggest production of salt in the world was exported from the Saline Dante of Hafun Salt Factory in northern Somalia (currently Hafun, then called "Dante").

== Governorates of Italian East Africa ==
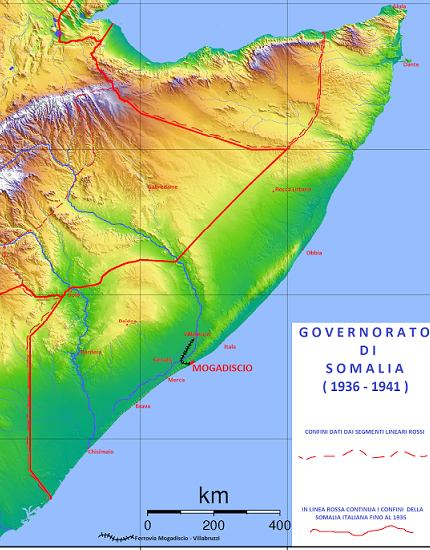
1936-1941 detailed Somalia Governorate map, with the Ogaden region annexed

English	Italian	Capital	Total population	Italians	Tag	Coat of Arms
Amhara Governorate	Amara	Gondar	2,000,000	11,103	AM	
Eritrea Governorate	Eritrea	Asmara	1,500,000	72,408	ER	
Galla-Sidamo Governorate	Galla e Sidama	Jimma/Gimma	4,000,0000	11,823	GS	
Harrar Governorate	Harar	Harrar	1,600,000	10,035	HA	
Scioa Governorate	Scioà	Addis Abeba	1,850,000	40,698	SC	
Somalia Governorate	Somalia	Mogadishu	1,150,000	19,200	SOM	

In the summer of 1940, Italian forces conquered British Somaliland and incorporated it into the Somalia Governorate. British troops later re-seized the territory in March 1941.

== See also ==
- Italian Somaliland
- List of governors of the Somalia Governorate
- Italian East Africa

== Bibliography ==
- G. Pini. La strada nell’Africa Orientale Italiana in “Quaderni italiani serie xv, L’Africa Italiana” n. 4
