= Scioa Governorate =

Administrative division of Italian East Africa (1938–1941)

Addis Abeba Governorate (1936–1938) Governatorato di Addis Abeba Scioa Governorate (1938–1941) Governatorato dello Scioa
- Governorate of Italian East Africa
- Coat of Arms (1936–1938) Coat of Arms (1938–1941)

- Scioa (purple) within Italian East Africa
- Capital: Addis Abeba
- Population
- ca. 1,850,000
- Government
- Governor
  - 1936: Giuseppe Bottai
  - 1936–1938: Alfredo Siniscalchi
  - 1938–1939: Francesco Canero Medici
  - 1939: Enrico Cerulli
  - 1939–1940: Guglielmo Nasi
  - 1940–1941: Giuseppe Daodice
  - 1941: Agenore Frangipani
- Historical era: Interwar period World War II
  - Created: 1 June 1936
  - Enlarged into the Scioa Governorate: 11 November 1938
  - Allied occupation: 6 April 1941
Preceded by	Succeeded by
Ethiopian Empire	Ethiopian Empire

The Scioa Governorate (Governo dello Scioa), also known as the Shewa Governorate, was one of the six governorates of Italian East Africa. It was formed in 1936 from parts of the conquered Ethiopian Empire following the Second Italo-Ethiopian War with its administrative capital being Addis Abeba.

== History ==
It was originally founded as the Addis Abeba Governorate (Governorato di Addis Abeba), but on 11 November 1938 it was enlarged with parts of the Scioa region from the bordering Harar, Galla-Sidamo and Amhara Governorates, and the name was changed to the Scioa Governorate.

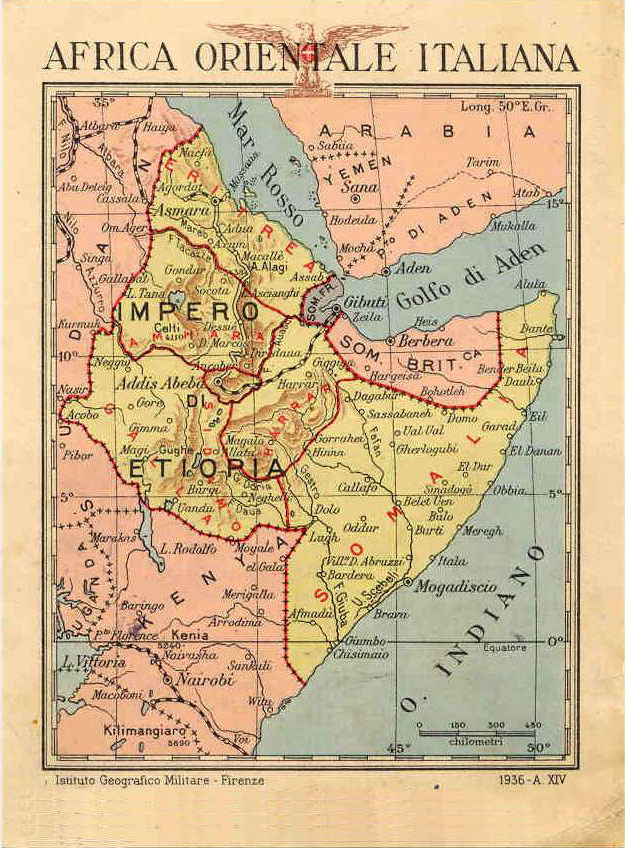
Map of the governorates of Italian East Africa in 1936, showing the smaller Addis Abeba Governorate before it became the Scioa Governorate

The Scioa Governorate was the only area of former Ethiopia fully pacified and rid of Ethiopian guerrilla in 1939, that allowed a huge development of infrastructures (roads like the Stada Imperiale between Asmara and Addis Abeba, buildings, dams, etc.) with the creation of a state-of-the-art "Addis Abeba Urbanistic and Architectural Plan" and a beginning of colonization in agricultural areas assigned to Italian colonists. Even some industrial facilities were developed in Addis Abeba and surroundings: for example at Addis Alem a huge factory for the production of slaked lime was established in 1938, and in its first year of production it turned out 30,000 hundredweights of the material.

The total area of the Scioa Governorate was initially in 1936 more than 7000 km^{2} (with 300000 inhabitants), but in 1939 was increased to nearly 65000 km2 and the population was more than one million and half inhabitants. Up to 85% of the 40000 Italians of Ethiopia lived in this governorate when the Allies conquered in it spring 1941, along with the rest of Italian Ethiopia. In October 1939 the Italian population of Addis Abeba was 35,441 of which 30.232 were male (85,3%) and 5,209 female (14,7%): in 1939 nearly 800 Italo-Ethiopian children were born from them.

The last governor of Scioa was Agenore Frangipani, who found himself having to counter the Allied advance without any hope in early 1941, was forced to give the Ethiopian capital to the British on 6 April 1941 without a fight. Indeed, the Italian Viceroy Prince Amedeo, Duke of Aosta ordered him to surrender the city peacefully in order to forestall a massacre of Italian civilians such as what happened a few days before in Dire Dawa. Frangipani-who was prepared for a defensive battle-reluctantly accepted the order to surrender. But having on him the responsibility and dishonor of surrender, Frangipani committed suicide during the retreat from the city. His family honored his old-aristocracy feelings about not accepting surrender without combat.

== See also ==
- List of governors of the Scioa Governorate
- Italians of Ethiopia
- History of Addis Ababa

== Bibliography ==
- Beltrami, Vanni. "Italia d'oltremare. Storie dei territori italiani dalla conquista alla caduta." Edizioni Nuova Cultura. Roma, 2013 ISBN 978-88-6134-702-1
- Del Boca, Angelo. La nostra Africa. Neri Pozza Editore. Vicenza, 2003 ISBN 8854509892
