= List of governors of the governorates of Italian East Africa =

The governorates of Italian East Africa after the 1938 creation of the Scioa Governorate, and before the 1940 invasion of British Somaliland.

Coat of arms of Italian East Africa.

Italian East Africa (Italian: Africa Orientale Italiana, A.O.I.) was a territory occupied by Fascist Italy from 1936 to 1941 in the Horn of Africa. It encompassed Italian Somaliland, Italian Eritrea, and occupied Ethiopian territories, all administered by a single administrative unit, the Governo Generale dell'Africa Orientale Italiana. The region was governed from Addis Ababa under the authority of a Governor-General, who represented the Italian crown and exercised executive powers in the territories.

Italian East Africa was administratively divided into six governorates. Eritrea and Somalia, Italian possessions since the 1880s, were enlarged with captured Ethiopian territory and became the Eritrea and Somalia Governorates. The remainder of the occupied Ethiopian territories comprised the Harar, Galla-Sidamo, Amhara, and Scioa Governorates. The following list details the individuals who served as governors of these territorial units during the occupation.

== List ==
=== Addis Ababa / Scioa Governorate ===
Arms of the Addis Ababa Governorate.

Arms of the Scioa Governorate.

No.	Portrait	Governor	Took office	Left office	Time in office
Addis Ababa Governorate
1	Giuseppe Bottai	Giuseppe Bottai (1895–1959)	5 May 1936	27 May 1936	22 days
2	Alfredo Siniscalchi	Alfredo Siniscalchi (1885–1954)	1 June 1936	23 September 1938	2 years, 114 days
3	Francesco Canero Medici	Francesco Canero Medici (1886–1946)	23 September 1938	1 January 1939	100 days
Scioa Governorate
1	Enrico Cerulli	Enrico Cerulli (1898–1988)	1 January 1939	5 May 1939	124 days
2	Guglielmo Nasi	Guglielmo Nasi (1879–1971)	5 May 1939	2 June 1940	1 year, 28 days
3	Giuseppe Daodice	Giuseppe Daodice (1882–1952)	2 June 1940	3 April 1941	305 days
–	Agenore Frangipani	Agenore Frangipani (1876–1941 (Note: Committed suicide.)); Acting	3 April 1941	6 April 1941 †	3 days

=== Amhara Governorate ===
Arms of the Amhara Governorate.

No.	Portrait	Governor	Took office	Left office	Time in office
1	Alessandro Pirzio Biroli	Alessandro Pirzio Biroli (1877–1962)	1 June 1936	15 December 1937	1 year, 197 days
2	Ottorino Mezzetti [it]	Ottorino Mezzetti (1877–1962)	15 December 1937	1 January 1939	1 year, 17 days
–	Luigi Frusci	Luigi Frusci (1879–1949); Acting	1 January 1939	19 May 1941	2 years, 138 days
–	Guglielmo Nasi	Guglielmo Nasi (1879–1971); Acting	19 May 1941	27 November 1941	192 days

=== Eritrea Governorate ===
Arms of the Eritrea Governorate.

No.	Portrait	Governor	Took office	Left office	Time in office
1	Alfredo Guzzoni	Alfredo Guzzoni (1877–1965)	1 June 1936	1 April 1937	304 days
2	Vincenzo de Feo	Vincenzo de Feo (1876–1955)	1 April 1937	15 December 1937	258 days
3	Giuseppe Daodice	Giuseppe Daodice (1882–1952)	15 December 1937	2 June 1940	2 years, 170 days
–	Luigi Frusci	Luigi Frusci (1879–1949); Acting	2 June 1940	19 May 1941	351 days

=== Galla-Sidamo Governorate ===
Arms of the Galla-Sidamo Governorate.

No.	Portrait	Governor	Took office	Left office	Time in office
1	Carlo Geloso	Carlo Geloso (1879–1957)	1 June 1936	9 July 1938	2 years, 38 days
2	Armando Felsani	Armando Felsani (1892–?)	10 July 1938	12 August 1938	33 days
3	Pietro Gazzera	Pietro Gazzera (1879–1953)	12 August 1938	6 July 1941	2 years, 328 days

=== Harar Governorate ===
Arms of the Harar Governorate.

No.	Portrait	Governor	Took office	Left office	Time in office
1	Guglielmo Nasi	Guglielmo Nasi (1879–1971)	1 June 1936	5 May 1939	2 years, 338 days
2	Enrico Cerulli	Enrico Cerulli (1898–1988)	5 May 1939	11 June 1940	1 year, 37 days
–	Guglielmo Nasi	Guglielmo Nasi (1879–1971); Acting	11 June 1940	4 February 1941	238 days
–	Pompeo Gorini [it]	Pompeo Gorini; Acting	4 February 1941	9 March 1941	33 days
–	Carlo De Simone	Carlo De Simone (1885–1951); Acting	10 March 1941	24 April 1941	45 days

=== Somalia Governorate ===
Arms of the Somalia Governorate.

No.	Portrait	Governor	Took office	Left office	Time in office
1	Ruggero Santini	Ruggero Santini (1870–1958)	25 May 1936	15 December 1937	1 year, 204 days
2	Francesco Caroselli	Francesco Caroselli (1887–1967)	15 December 1937	11 June 1940	2 years, 179 days
–	Gustavo Pesenti	Gustavo Pesenti (1878–1960); Acting	11 June 1940	31 January 1941	234 days
–	Carlo De Simone	Carlo De Simone (1885–1951); Acting	31 January 1941	20 March 1941	48 days

== See also ==
- Italian East Africa
  - List of governors-general of Italian East Africa
- Italian Ethiopia
- Italian Eritrea
  - List of colonial governors of Italian Eritrea
- Italian Somaliland
  - List of colonial governors of Italian Somaliland
- History of Ethiopia
- History of Eritrea
- History of Somalia
- Second Italo-Ethiopian War
- East African campaign (World War II)
  - Arbegnoch
  - Italian guerrilla war in Ethiopia

== Bibliography ==
- Sbacchi, Alberto (1997). Legacy of Bitterness. Lawrenceville, NJ: Red Sea Press(NJ). ISBN 0-932415-74-1.
- Ben-Ghiat, R.; Fuller, M. (30 April 2016). Italian Colonialism. New York: Springer. ISBN 978-1-4039-8158-5.
- Mockler, Anthony (2019). Il mito dell'Impero. Storia delle guerre italiane in Abissinia e in Etiopia (in Italian). Res Gestae. ISBN 978-88-6697-269-3.
- Pergher, Roberta (2 November 2017). Mussolini's Nation-Empire. Cambridge University Press. ISBN 978-1-108-35595-7.
