= Agenore Frangipani =

Italian general

- Born: 4 December 1876; Benevento, Kingdom of Italy
- Died: 6 April 1941 (aged 64); Addis Ababa, Italian Ethiopia
- Military career
- Allegiance: Kingdom of Italy
- Branch: Royal Italian Army
- Rank: Major General
- Conflicts: Italo-Turkish War; World War I; Battles of the Isonzo; Second Italo-Ethiopian War; Spanish Civil War; Italian invasion of Albania; World War II; East African Campaign
- Awards: War Cross for Military Valor; War Merit Cross; Military Order of Savoy; Order of the Crown of Italy; Colonial Order of the Star of Italy

Agenore Frangipani (Benevento, 4 December 1876 – Addis Ababa, 6 April 1941) was an Italian general and colonial official, and the last Italian governor of Addis Ababa and Scioa.

== Biography ==
Frangipani was born in 1876 to an aristocratic family, the second son of the Marquis of Mileta. He initially enlisted in the Royal Italian Navy, attending the Naval Academy of Livorno for some time, but moved to the Royal Italian Army after some time, attending the Nunziatella Military College in Naples and graduating in 1899 as lieutenant of the Corazzieri.

In 1906 he was promoted to captain, and on the following year he married Countess Cristina Agazzi, member of a noble Lombard family. In 1911 Frangipani fought in Libya during the Italo-Turkish War, and during World War I he fought on the Karst Plateau, being promoted to major in 1917 and to colonel in 1919. In 1923 he joined the National Fascist Party; in the following years he worked for the Ministry of War and served as military attaché in Berlin and Paris until 1930. He also served as official in the colonial administrator in Italy's East African colonies for many years (in 1922 he signed a treaty with Arthur Wallace Skrine, British deputy governor of Kassala province, rectifying the border between Eritrea and Sudan), as well as consul in Ethiopia.

During the second half of the 1930s he fought in the Second Italo-Ethiopian War, being promoted to major general in 1936, then in the Spanish Civil War and finally in the conquest of Albania. At the outbreak of World War II he was in Italian East Africa, and on 3 April 1941 he replaced Giuseppe Daodice as governor of Addis Ababa and the Scioa Governorate. He was ordered by the Duke of Aosta, Viceroy of Italian East Africa, to surrender Addis Ababa to the advancing British forces without fighting, in order to spare the civilian population.

He found himself having to counter the Allied advance without any hope: he was forced to give the Ethiopia's capital to the British on 6 April 1941. Indeed, the Italian Viceroy Amedeo d'Aosta ordered him (the Italian governor of Addis Abeba), to surrender the city to the British commanders without any fight, in order to forestall the massacre of Italian civilians. The Viceroy decided to allow British troops to enter the Ethiopian city to prevent from happening again the atrocities similar to those committed a few days before at Dire Dawa and other Ethiopian cities against Italian civilians. The first British troops entered the town at dawn on April 5, a month before Negus Haile Selassie returned there escorted by British troops. Frangipani-who was prepared for a defensive battle- accepted reluctantly the order to surrender. Roberto Biagioni

Frangipani reluctantly carried out this order on 6 April 1941, but later on the same day, feeling dishonored, he committed suicide.

His family honored his old-aristocracy feelings about not accepting surrender without combat.

== Awards ==
Some of the Awards (and Medals) received by Agenore Frangipani were:

Grand'Ufficiale dell'Ordine della Corona d'Italia - ribbon for ordinary uniform

Grand'Ufficiale dell'Ordine della Corona d'Italia

Grand'Ufficiale dell'Ordine dei Santi Maurizio e Lazzaro - ribbon for ordinary uniform

Grand'Ufficiale dell'Ordine dei Santi Maurizio e Lazzaro

Commendatore dell'Ordine militare di Savoia - ribbon for ordinary uniform

Commendatore dell'Ordine militare di Savoia

Commendatore dell'Ordine coloniale della stella d'Italia - ribbon for ordinary uniform

Commendatore dell'Ordine coloniale della stella d'Italia

Gold Medal of Military Valor

== Bibliography ==
- Goffredo Orlandi Contucci, A.O.I.- AFRICA ORIENTALE ITALIANA - La conquista dell'Impero nel ricordo del tenente Goffredo Orlandi Contucci - Edizioni MyLife, Monte Colombo/Coriano, 2009 ISBN 978-88-6285-100-8

Preceded by Giuseppe Daodice	Italian Governor of Addis Ababa	Succeeded by vacant
