= Governorates of Italian East Africa =

The six AOI governorates: Eritrea, Amara, Harar, Galla-Sidamo, Scioa and Somalia

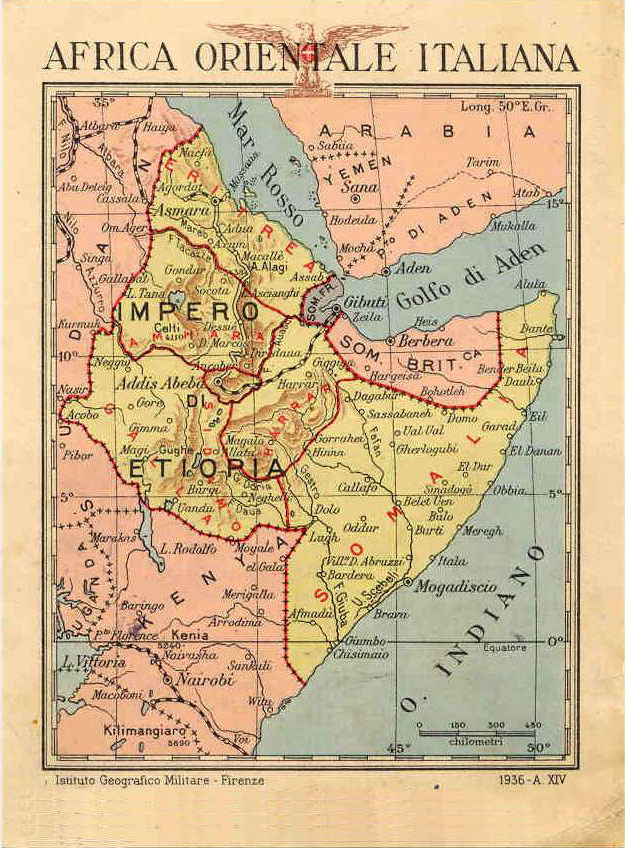
Map showing Italian East Africa, with the borders of the governorates. (Note the smaller Addis Abeba Governorate before it became the Scioa Governorate)

Italian East Africa was a territory occupied by Fascist Italy from 1936 to 1941 in the Horn of Africa. It encompassed Italian Somaliland, Italian Eritrea, and occupied Ethiopian territories, all administered by a single administrative unit, the Governo Generale dell'Africa Orientale Italiana. The region was governed from Addis Ababa under the authority of a Governor-General, who represented the Italian crown and exercised executive powers in the territories.

Italian East Africa was administratively divided into six governorates. Eritrea and Somalia, Italian possessions since the 1880s, were enlarged with captured Ethiopian territory and became the Eritrea and Somalia Governorates. The remainder of the occupied Ethiopian territories comprised the Harar, Galla-Sidamo, Amhara, and Scioa Governorates. At its largest extent, Italian East Africa occupied territories in British Somaliland, British Kenya, and Anglo-Egyptian Sudan. By 1939, it was settled by about 165,270 Italian colonists.

The governorates were divided into governor commissariats, governed by a governor commissioner assisted by a vice commissioner. The commissariats were divided into residences, sometimes divided into vice residences. The governor commissioners were usually also the owners of the residence with headquarters in the commissariats capital. As a rule, the headquarters of the commissariats were provided with primary schools, post offices and telegraphs, infirmaries with a doctor, and runways for airplanes. The residences were equipped with a post office, telegraph and infirmary with a doctor.

== List of governorates ==
English	Capital	Total population	Italians	Tag	Coat of arms
Amhara Governorate	Gondar	2,000,000	11,103	AM	
Eritrea Governorate	Asmara	1,500,000	72,408	ER	
Galla-Sidamo Governorate	Jimma	4,000,000	11,823	GS	
Harar Governorate	Harar	1,600,000	10,035	HA	
Scioa Governorate (Known as the Addis Abeba Governorate until 1938)	Addis Ababa	1,850,000	40,698	SC	
Somalia Governorate	Mogadishu	1,150,000 (2,000,000 after the annexation of British Somaliland)	19,200	SOM	

== See also ==
- Italian East Africa
  - List of governors-general of Italian East Africa
- List of governors of the governorates of Italian East Africa

== Bibliography ==
- Ben-Ghiat, R.; Fuller, M. (2016-04-30). Italian Colonialism. New York: Springer. ISBN 978-1-4039-8158-5.
- Mockler, Anthony (2019). Il mito dell'Impero. Storia delle guerre italiane in Abissinia e in Etiopia (in Italian). Res Gestae. ISBN 978-88-6697-269-3.
- Pergher, Roberta (2017-11-02). Mussolini's Nation-Empire. Cambridge University Press. ISBN 978-1-108-35595-7.
- Sbacchi, Alberto (1997). Legacy of Bitterness. Lawrenceville, NJ: Red Sea Press(NJ). ISBN 0-932415-74-1.
- Stewart, Andrew (2016). The First Victory: The Second World War and the East Africa Campaign. London: Yale University Press. ISBN 978-0-300-20855-9.
