= Giuseppe Daodice =

Italian general

- Born: 16 April 1882; Dalmine, Italy
- Died: 4 December 1952 (aged 70); Bergamo, Italy
- Military career
- Allegiance: Kingdom of Italy
- Branch: Royal Italian Army
- Commands: General Officer of Italian Army; Governor of Eritrea; Governor of Scioa/Addis Abeba
- Conflicts: World War I;Second Italo-Abyssinian War;World War II

Giuseppe Daodice (16 April 1882 – 4 December 1952) was an Italian general. He was the 6th Italian governor of Addis Ababa and 3rd Italian governor of Scioa (1940–1941). He was a knight of the Order of Saints Maurice and Lazarus.

== Biography ==
Ordine supremo della Santissima Annunziata

Ordine di Vittorio Veneto

Ordine dei Santi Maurizio e Lazzaro

Ordine militare di Savoia

Ordine della Corona d'Italia

Giuseppe Daodice when was twelve years old went to a catholic seminary in Bergamo. But the young man did not want to pursue a career in the church and his parents enrolled him at the Nunziatella military academy. Then went to the Military Academy of Modena and became lieutenant of cavalry. He participated in the Italo-Turkish War as Official of active service in Tripoli, in the siege of Ain Zara and in Cyrenaica. He was conscript in 1915 and -by intervening in the battles of the Isonzo- he was wounded in the Seventh Battle of the Isonzo: for this serious wound he was relegated to service distant from the front for some months, but soon wanted to go back to the battle front. Daodice was then promoted to major after the Battle of the solstice and the Battle of Vittorio Veneto in 1918.

After the war, Daodice remained hostile to the Fascism becoming "military attaché" in 1926 in Lisbon and later in Budapest from 1928 to 1931. In 1934 he was promoted to colonel, fighting the Ethiopian War (First Battle of Tembien, Battle of Step Uarieu and Battle of Mai Ceu) as adjutant first to Badoglio and then to Rodolfo Graziani. During the war Daodice was the author of numerous deportations to concentration camps of members of the local population. With his successful victories, Daodice was awarded the Order of the Supreme Santissima Annunziata.

Daodice was governor of Italian Eritrea from December 1937 to June 1940 and greatly improved the colony during his mandate. During his rule he promoted the architectural development of Italian Asmara, a city that was nicknamed Little Rome even because of him. He was also Governor of Addis Ababa from 1940 to 1941, in the Africa Orientale Italiana.

In his governorship to Addis Ababa/Scioa Governorate (2 June 1940) Daodice built numerous infrastructure to improve the social status; the charge was transferred to Agenore Frangipani in 1941. Daodice returned to Italy just before the British conquest of Ethiopia's capital, where he was promoted to major general and was member of the Italian Parliament, retiring to private life and taking part in a few sessions in two years as "deputy".

Daodice voted against Benito Mussolini after 25 July 1943, and as a consequence from Frosinone, where he then lived, was forced to flee to Caserta and from there to Brindisi, with the King Victor Emmanuel III and Badoglio in September 1943.

After the war he was tried as fascist and for possible crimes perpetrated in Ethiopia: he was sentenced to fifteen years of forced labor, but he did only five. He died in Bergamo in December 1952.

== Awards ==
Giuseppe Daodice was named Knight receiving five military & civilian awards: Ordine supremo della Santissima Annunziata, Ordine di Vittorio Veneto, Ordine dei Santi Maurizio e Lazzaro, Ordine militare di Savoia and Ordine della Corona d'Italia.

== See also ==
- Second Italo-Ethiopian War
- East African Campaign (World War II)
- Eritrea Governorate
- Scioa Governorate

== Bibliography ==
- Goffredo Orlandi Contucci, A.O.I.- AFRICA ORIENTALE ITALIANA - La conquista dell'Impero nel ricordo del tenente Goffredo Orlandi Contucci - Edizioni MyLife, Monte Colombo/Coriano, 2009 ISBN 978-88-6285-100-8

Preceded by Vincenzo De Feo	Italian Governor of Eritrea; 1937-1940	Succeeded by Luigi Frusci
Preceded by Guglielmo Nasi	Italian Governor of Addis Ababa; 1940-1941	Succeeded by Agenore Frangipani
