= Harar Governorate =

Governorate of Italian East Africa (1936–1941)

Harar Governorate Governatorato di Harar
- Governorate of Italian East Africa
- Coat of arms

- Harar (yellow) within Italian East Africa
- Capital: Harar
- Population
- ca. 1,600,000
- Government
- Governor
  - 1936-1939: Guglielmo Nasi
  - 1939-1940: Enrico Cerulli
  - 1940-1941: Guglielmo Nasi
  - 1941: Pompeo Gorini
  - 1941: Carlo De Simone
- Historical era: Interwar period World War II
  - Created: 1 June 1936
  - Allied occupation: 24 April 1941
Preceded by	Succeeded by
Ethiopian Empire	Ethiopian Empire

Harar Governorate was one of the six governorates of Italian East Africa. It was formed in 1936 from parts of the conquered Ethiopian Empire following the Second Italo-Ethiopian War.

The capital of governorate was Harar, but Dire Dawa was the most important city. In the territories around these two cities more than 10,000 Italian colonists went to live since 1937 creating some manufacturing industries (after the area was pacified from the Arbegnoch guerrilla). In November 1938 some territory of Harar in the Scioa region was given to the neighboring Addis Abeba Governorate, enlarging it to the Scioa Governorate.

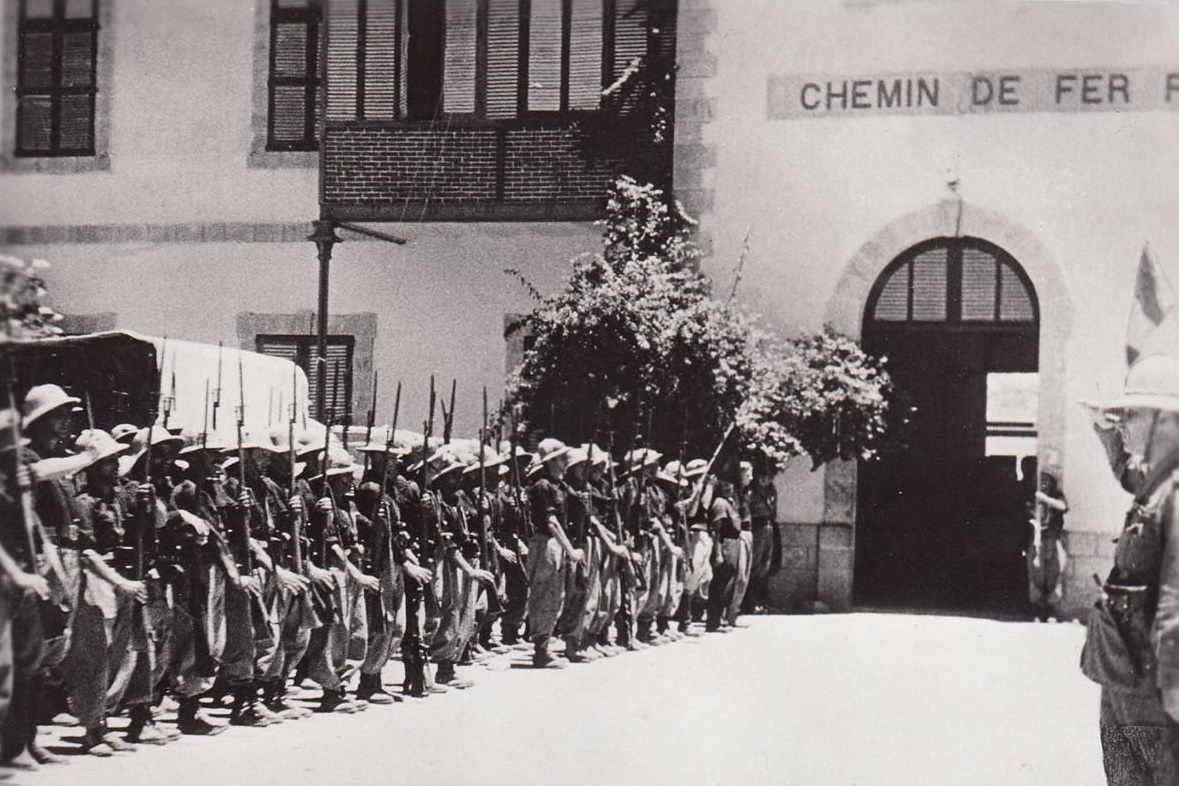
Italian troops in the Dire Dawa railway station in 1936

The Harar governorate was subdivided in the "Commissariati" of Arussi, Cercer, Dire Dawa, Ghimir, Giggiga, Goba, Harar and Adama.

== Subdivisions ==
The Amara Government was made up of the following commissioners:

- Arussi
- Cercer
- Dire Daua
- Ghimir
- Giggiga
- Goba
- Harar
- Adama

== Governors ==
- Guglielmo Nasi: 1936-1939 (first time)
- Enrico Cerulli: 1939-1940
- Guglielmo Nasi: 1940-1941 (second time)
- Pompeo Gorini: 1941
- Carlo De Simone: 1941

== See also ==
- Italian East Africa
- Italian Ethiopia
- List of governors of the Harar Governornate
