= Pietro Gazzera =

Italian army general (1879-1953)

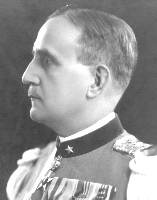

Minister of War
- In office 12 September 1929 – 22 July 1933
- Prime Minister: Benito Mussolini
- Preceded by: Benito Mussolini
- Succeeded by: Benito Mussolini

Viceroy of Italian Ethiopia
- In office May 23 – 6 July 1941
- Preceded by: Prince Amedeo, Duke of Aosta
- Succeeded by: Guglielmo Nasi

Governor of Galla-Sidamo
- In office 12 August 1938 – 6 July 1941
- Preceded by: Armando Felsani
- Succeeded by: title abolished

Personal details
- Born: 11 December 1879 Bene Vagienna, Kingdom of Italy
- Died: 30 June 1953 (aged 73) Cirié, Italy
- Party: National Fascist Party
- Occupation: Politician

Pietro Gazzera (11 December 1879 – 30 June 1953) was an officer in the Italian Royal Army during World War II, as well as a prewar Italian politician.

Gazzera was born in Bene Vagienna, he joined the Italian Army and fought in the Italo-Turkish War and World War I. He was one of the signatories of the Armistice of Villa Giusti, which ended the war with Austria-Hungary on the Italian Front.

In 1928, starting as the Under-Secretary in the Ministry of War, Gazzera was the Minister of War from 1929 to 1933. From 1 August 1938 to 6 July 1941, Gazzera was the Governor of Galla-Sidamo in Italian East Africa.

General Gazzera commanded forces in the "Southern Sector" (the Galla and Sidamo area around Jimma) during the East African Campaign. Following the fall of Amba Alagi in May 1941, Gazzera succeeded Amedeo, Duke of Aosta as the acting Governor-General of Italian East Africa. After Jimma fell on 21 June, Gazzera staged a mobile defense and held out in Galla-Sidamo for several weeks. His forces finally capitulated in July 1941 when he was cut off by the Free Belgian Forces of Major-General Auguste-Éduard Gilliaert.

From the last telegram sent to Italy announcing the surrender:

The Southern theater has done everything humanly possible from June 10, 1940, to the present day to uphold the name of Italian arms in Kenya, Sudan, and the Empire. The troops fought like lions not only against the British, but also, and even more so, when the rebels attacked us in our rear areas. Even after the surrender of Amba Alagi, we defended ourselves tooth and nail, redoubling our efforts as resources diminished and privations increased. Today, even without hope, we stopped the Belgians in their full attack on Butta. Our last faithful Askaris were just kissing the rifles given them by the Italian government and wept when they realized we had to surrender.

== Command history ==
- Commanding Officer, Brigade Basilicata – 1926
- Commandant of War School – 1926
- General Officer Commanding, Division Genova – 1926 to 1928
- Under-Secretary Ministry of War – 1928 to 1929
- Minister of War – 1929 to 1933
- Governor of Galla and Sidamo – 1938 to 1941
- Member of the Commission for the Affairs of Italian Africa, Senate – 1939 to 1940
- General Officer Commanding, 24th Colonial Division – 1940 to 1941
- Acting Governor-General, Italian East Africa – 1941
- Prisoner of war – 1941 to 1943
- Commissioner for Prisoners of War – 1943 to 1945

== See also ==
- East African Campaign
- Italian Governors of Galla-Sidama

Government offices
Preceded by Amedeo, 3rd Duke of Aosta	(acting) Viceroy and Governor-General of Italian East Africa; 23 May – 6 July 1941	Succeeded by Guglielmo Nasi
