= Alfredo Siniscalchi =

Italian politician (1885–1954)

Alfredo Siniscalchi (22 February 1885 – 3 March 1954) was the 2nd Italian governor of Addis Ababa. He was born in Naples, Kingdom of Italy. He died in Rome, Italy.

Preceded by Giuseppe Bottai	Italian Governor of Addis Ababa; 1936–1938	Succeeded by Francesco Camero Medici
