= Francesco Canero Medici =

Italian diplomat

Francesco Canero Medici (1 June 1886 – 19 May 1946) was an Italian colonial official, who worked with Luigi Amedeo, Duke of the Abruzzi and Italo Balbo.

Medici was born in São Paulo, Brazil. His parents were Raffaele Gaetano Canero Medici and Rosina Tramontano.

He married Anna Amalia Ludovica Ullman (03-03-1891 – 17-06-1929) in 12-11-1922, and had two sons. After Anna's death he married Eileen Alison Coutts (12-02-1901 – 05-04-1987) in 12-12-1936, widow of Reginald Mander (sept 1881 – 8-Mar-1932), with whom she had Reginald Nicholas Mander (1929). Reginald married Jacqueline Valerie Faye Meyer (05-Mar-1933), daughter of Rollo John Oliver (15 March 1905 – 9 March 1991), known generally as 'Jack Meyer (educator and cricketer)' and Joyce Symons.

He was nominated as Governor of Addis Abeba in 1938 and served as such from 23 September to 1 January 1939. He was prefect of Tripoli between 1939 and 1941. Francesco and Eillen divorced in 1943, in Florence.

Medici died near Rome in 1946 and Eillen in Oxfordshire, UK, on 5 April 1987.
