= Luigi Frusci =

Officer served in the Italian conquest of Ethiopia and World War II

- Born: 16 January 1879; Venosa, Kingdom of Italy
- Died: 12 June 1949 (aged 70); Venosa, Italy
- Military career
- Allegiance: Kingdom of Italy
- Branch: Royal Italian Army
- Commands: General of Italian Army; Governor of Eritrea.
- Conflicts: First World War; Italian Front; Second Italo-Abyssinian War; Spanish Civil War; Second World War; East African Campaign; Italian conquest of British Somaliland

Luigi Frusci (16 January 1879 – 12 June 1949) was an Italian military officer in the Italian Royal Army (Regio Esercito) during the Italian conquest of Ethiopia and World War II. He was the last Italian Governor of Eritrea and Amhara.

== Biography ==
Ordine militare di Savoia

Ordine militare d'Italia

Medaglia d'argento al valor militare

Croce di guerra al valor militare

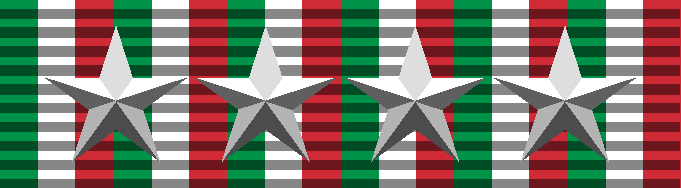
Medaglia commemorativa della guerra italo-austriaca (1915 – 18)

Medaglia commemorativa dell' Unità d'Italia

Medaglia interalleata della Vittoria

Luigi Frusci was born in Venosa in 1879 and soon enlisted in the Italian Army. He fought during World War I and -after Benito Mussolini took control of Italy- he enrolled in the National Fascist Party.

Frusci fought on the southern front for General Rodolfo Graziani during the Second Italo-Abyssinian War. In April 1936, during the Battle of the Ogaden, Frusci commanded the center column of three columns attacking the Ethiopian "Hindenburg Wall". Later Frusci was the commander of the Italian "volunteers" of the 2nd CCNN Division "Fiamme Nere" in the Corps of Volunteer Troops (Corpo Truppe Volontarie) during the Spanish Civil War in 1937 and 1938.

In 1939, Frusci become Governor of Amhara in northern Ethiopia, and later governor of Italian Eritrea until 1941.

During World War II, Frusci was the main military commander in the Italian Eritrea Governorate. As a Lieutenant-General, he commanded Italian forces fighting in Eritrea during the East African Campaign. He fought in the Italian conquest of British Somaliland, conquering the capital Berbera.

In mid-1940, Frusci oversaw the initial Italian attacks into the Sudan, conquering Kassala. Later in 1940, even when ordered to do so, he chose not pull out of the Sudan. Instead, he rebuffed the initial efforts of British and Commonwealth forces to retake the border towns. In November, an assault on Gallabat was stopped short of its goals, the attacking force was hit hard from the air, and the position was re-taken by Italian ground forces.

After the British and Commonwealth forces crossed the border and launched an offensive in January 1941, Frusci also oversaw the defensive actions at Agordat, Keren, and the rest of Eritrea.

With the fall of Eritrea, Frusci became a prisoner of war. In 1948 Frusci received from the Italian government the award "Commendatore dell'Ordine Militare d'Italia". Frusci died in 1949 at his hometown of Venosa, in Basilicata.

== Command history ==
- Inspector of Infantry
- Colonel, Ogaden border region command, Italian Somaliland – 1935 to 1936
- Deputy General Officer Commanding, (Corpo Truppe Volontarie), Spain – 1936 to 1937
- General Officer Commanding, 20th Division Friuli, Spain – 1937 to 1938
- General Officer Commanding, XX Corps, Libya – 1938 to 1939
- Governor of Amhara, Ethiopia – 1939 to 1941
- Governor of Eritrea – 1940 to 1941
- General Officer Commanding, Eritrean Army, East Africa – 1940 to 1941
- Prisoner of War – 1941 to 1945

== Awards ==
Luigi Frusci received many awards (and medals). The most important were: "Ordine militare dei Savoia"; "Ordine militare d'Italia"; "War Silver Medal"; "Medaglia interalleata della Vittoria" and "Cruz de la guerra por la Unidad Nacional Española".

== Bibliography ==
- Goffredo Orlandi Contucci, A.O.I.- AFRICA ORIENTALE ITALIANA - La conquista dell'Impero nel ricordo del tenente Goffredo Orlandi Contucci (The Conquest of the Empire in Memory of Lieutenant Goffredo Orlandi Contucci) - Edizioni MyLife, Monte Colombo/Coriano, 2009 ISBN 978-88-6285-100-8

== See also ==
- Eritrea Governorate
- Amhara Governorate
- Battle of Keren
- Second Italo-Abyssinian War
- Italian Order of Battle Second Italo-Abyssinian War
- East African Campaign (World War II)
- Order of Battle, East African Campaign (World War II)
- German Motorized Company
- History of Italy

Political offices
| Preceded by Giuseppe Daodice | Governor of Eritrea; 1940–1941 | Succeeded by none |
