= Carlo De Simone =

Italian Army officer during World War II

- Born: Carlo De Simone; 4 March 1885
- Died: 1951 (Aged 65–66)
- Military career
- Allegiance: Kingdom of Italy
- Branch: Royal Italian Army
- Rank: Lieutenant-General
- Commands: Commanding Officer, 3rd Bersaglieri Regiment; Commandant of Harrar, Italian East Africa - 1936; Commanding Officer, 2nd Armoured Brigade - 1937 to 1939; General Officer Commanding, 132nd Armored Division Ariete - 1939; General Officer Commanding, Somaliland Army, East Africa - 1940 to 1941; Prisoner of war - 1941 to 1944; General Officer Commanding, VII Territorial Defence Command - 1945; Prefect of Bologna - 1950

Carlo De Simone (4 March 1885 – 1951) was an officer in the Italian Army during World War II.

== Biography ==
During most of the East African Campaign, Lieutenant-General De Simone commanded Italian forces in southern Italian Somaliland. However, during the Italian invasion of British Somaliland, De Simone commanded General Guglielmo Nasi's main "centre" column. De Simone's command in Italian Somaliland included the reinforced Harar Division (XIII Colonial Brigade, XIV Colonial Brigade, and XV Colonial Brigade - amounting to eleven infantry battalions, fourteen batteries of artillery, 21 howitzer batteries, half a company of M11/39 medium tanks, a squadron of 12 L3/35 light tanks, and an armored car company. Whilst in command of these forces, De Simone won the Battle of Tug Argan, where his centre column overcame a smaller British army and forced them to evacuate. His forces captured Berbera from the British on 19 August 1940, solidifying Italian control over Somaliland until Britain's Operation Appearance.

== Command history ==
- Commanding Officer, 3rd Bersaglieri Regiment
- Governor of Harar, Italian East Africa - 1936
- Commanding Officer, 2nd Armoured Brigade - 1937 to 1939
- General Officer Commanding, 132nd Armoured Division Ariete - 1939
- General Officer Commanding, Somaliland Army, East Africa - 1940 to 1941
- Military Governor of British Somalia (annexed to Italian Somalia) from July 1940 to April 1941
- Governor of Italian Somalia from January 1941 to April 1941
- Prisoner of war - 1941 to 1944
- General Officer Commanding, VII Territorial Defence Command - 1945
- Prefect of Bologna - 1950

== See also ==
- Second Italo-Abyssinian War
- East African Campaign (World War II)
- Order of Battle, East African Campaign (World War II)
