= Enrico Cerulli =

Italian islamicist and diplomat (1898–1988)

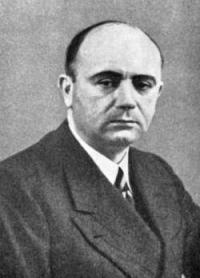
- Born: February 15, 1898; Naples, Italy
- Died: 19 August 1988 (aged 90)
- Education: University of Naples
- Occupations: writer, scholar, governor, diplomat

Signature
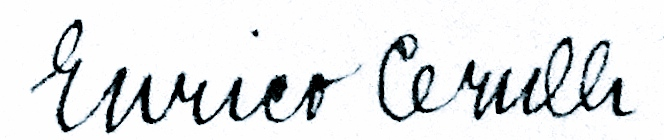

Enrico Cerulli (15 February 1898 – 19 August 1988) was an Italian scholar of Somali and Ethiopian studies, a governor and a diplomat during and after Italian Fascism.

== Biography ==
Cerulli was born in Naples, Italy in 1898. He wrote his doctoral thesis at the University of Naples Federico II on the traditional law of the Somali. At the same time, he studied Ethio-Semitic languages under Francesco Gallina, and Arabic and Islamic studies under Carlo Alfonso Nallino and Giorgio Levi Della Vida at the Regio Istituto Orientale (later Istituto Universitario Orientale, today Università di Napoli "L'Orientale").

Cerulli is also renowned for his studies on the Latin and Old French translation of the Arabic Kitab al-Miraj, a famous Muslim book concerned with Muhammad's ascension into Heaven (known as the Mi'raj), following his miraculous one-night journey from Mecca to Jerusalem (the Isra). The book's Islamic depictions of Hell are believed by some scholars, including Cerulli, to have been a major influence on Dante's 14th century masterpiece, the Divine Comedy.

Between January 1939 and June 1940, Cerulli was Governor of Scioa (Shewa) and later of Harar, two provinces of Italian East Africa. He also headed the political office for East Africa in the Ministry of Foreign Affairs.

The restored regime of Haile Selassie I approached the United Nations War Crimes Commission in 1947 to have him tried for war crimes, along with nine other Italians. In 1948, the Commission ruled that he was suspected war criminal, and his name was added to the international registry of war criminals. The Ethiopian government abandoned its case against him due to its inability to obtain extraditions, but barred him permanently from entering Ethiopia.

Later, from 1950 to 1954, Cerulli served as the Italian Ambassador to Iran.

Finally he was named President of Accademia Nazionale dei Lincei in Rome.

== Works ==
- 1922: Folk-literature of the Galla of Southern Abyssinia. Cambridge, MA.
- 1930-1933: Etiopia Occidentale (dallo Scioa alla frontiera del Sudan). Note del viaggio, 1927-1928. 2 Vols. Roma.
- 1931: Documenti arabi per la storia dell'Etiopia. Roma: G. Bardi.
- 1936: Studi etiopici. Vol. I: La lingua e la storia di Harar. Roma: Istituto per l'Oriente.
- 1936: Studi etiopici. Vol. II: La lingue e la storia dei Sidamo. Roma: Istituto per l'Oriente.
- 1938: Studi etiopici. Vol. III: Il linguaggio dei Giangerò ed alcune lingue Sidama dell'Omo (Basket, Ciara, Zaissè). Roma; Istituto per l'Oriente. [reprinted: 1963]
- 1943: Il Libro etiopico dei Miracoli di Maria e le sue fonti nelle letterature del Medio Evo latino. Roma.
- 1943-1947: Etiopi in Palestina: storia della comunità etiopica di Gerusalemme. 2 vols. Roma: Libreria dello Stato.
- 1949: Il 'Libro della Scala' e la questione delle fonti arabo-spagnole della Divina Commedia. Città del Vaticano.
- 1951: Studi etiopici. Vol. IV: La lingua Caffina. Roma: Istituto per l'Oriente.
- 1956: (ed.) Atti di Krestos Samra. (Corpus Scriptorum Christianorum Orientalium, 163–164; Scriptores Aetiopici, 33–34) Louvain.
- 1957-1964: Somalia: scritti vari editi ed inediti. 3 vols.
- 1958: Storia della letteratura etiopica. Milano. [3rd. ed. 1968].
- 1958-1960: Scritti teologici etiopici dei secoli XVI-XVII. 2 vols. Città del Vaticano.
- 1959: (ed.) Atti di Giulio di Aqfahs. (Corpus Scriptorum Christianorum Orientalium, 190–191; Scriptores Aetiopici, 37–38) Louvain.
- 1971: (with: Fabrizio A. Pennacchietti) Testi neo-aramaici dell’Iran settentrionale. Napoli : Istituto Universitario Orientale di Napoli.
- 1971: L'Islam di ieri e di oggi. Roma. Istituto per l'Oriente

== See also ==
- Somali Studies
- Ethiopian Studies
