= List of governors-general of Italian East Africa =

Governor-General of Italian East Africa
- Governatore Generale della Africa Orientale Italiana
- Coat of arms of Italian East Africa

- Flag of viceroy of the Kingdom of Italy

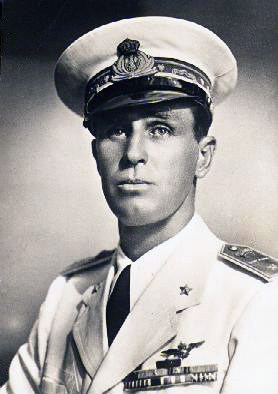
- Longest serving Prince Amedeo, Duke of Aosta; 21 December 1937 – 19 May 1941
- Reports to: King of Italy
- Residence: Guenete Leul Palace, Addis Ababa
- Formation: 9 May 1936
- First holder: Pietro Badoglio
- Final holder: Guglielmo Nasi
- Abolished: 27 November 1941

Italian East Africa (Italian: Africa Orientale Italiana, A.O.I.) was a territory occupied by Fascist Italy from 1936 to 1941 in the Horn of Africa. It encompassed Italian Somaliland, Italian Eritrea, and occupied Ethiopian territories, all administered by a single administrative unit, the Governo Generale dell'Africa Orientale Italiana. The region was governed from Addis Ababa under the authority of a Governor-General, who represented the Italian crown and exercised executive powers in the territories. The Governor-General was also Viceroy of Ethiopia.

With the outbreak of the war in October 1935, General Emilio De Bono was appointed High Commissioner; he was succeeded by Marshal of Italy Pietro Badoglio, who was appointed Governor-General and Viceroy on May 9, 1936.

Below is a chronological list of all individuals who held that office during the brief existence of Italian East Africa.

== List ==
No.	Portrait	Viceroy and Governor-General	Took office	Left office	Time in office	Defence branch
1	Pietro Badoglio	Marshal; Pietro Badoglio (1871–1956) (Note: Took control of Addis Ababa on 5 May 1936 at the end of the March of the Iron Will, during the Second Italo-Ethiopian War.)	9 May 1936	11 June 1936	33 days	Royal Italian Army
2	Rodolfo Graziani	Marshal; Rodolfo Graziani (1882–1955)	11 June 1936	21 December 1937	1 year, 193 days	Royal Italian Army
3	Prince Amedeo, Duke of Aosta	General; Prince Amedeo, Duke of Aosta (1898–1942)	21 December 1937	19 May 1941 (Note: Surrendered to the Allies at the Battle of Amba Alagi, during the East African campaign of World War II.)	3 years, 149 days	Royal Italian Army
–	Pietro Gazzera	General; Pietro Gazzera (1879–1953); Acting	23 May 1941	6 July 1941	44 days	Royal Italian Army
–	Guglielmo Nasi	General; Guglielmo Nasi (1879–1971); Acting	6 July 1941	27 November 1941	144 days	Royal Italian Army

== See also ==
- Italian East Africa
  - List of governors of the governorates of Italian East Africa
- Italian Eritrea
  - List of colonial governors of Italian Eritrea
- Italian Somaliland
  - List of colonial governors of Italian Somaliland
- History of Ethiopia
- History of Eritrea
- History of Somalia
- Second Italo-Ethiopian War
- East African campaign (World War II)
  - Arbegnoch
  - Italian guerrilla war in Ethiopia

== Bibliography ==
- Sbacchi, Alberto (1997). Legacy of Bitterness. Lawrenceville, NJ: Red Sea Press(NJ). ISBN 0-932415-74-1.
- Ben-Ghiat, R.; Fuller, M. (30 April 2016). Italian Colonialism. New York: Springer. ISBN 978-1-4039-8158-5.
- Mockler, Anthony (2019). Il mito dell'Impero. Storia delle guerre italiane in Abissinia e in Etiopia (in Italian). Res Gestae. ISBN 978-88-6697-269-3.
- Pergher, Roberta (2 November 2017). Mussolini's Nation-Empire. Cambridge University Press. ISBN 978-1-108-35595-7.
