= Galla-Sidamo Governorate =

Governorate of Italian East Africa (1936–1941

Galla-Sidamo Governorate Governatorato di Galla e Sidama
- Governorate of Italian East Africa
- Coat of Arms

- Galla-Sidamo (orange) within Italian East Africa
- Capital: Jimma
- Population
- ca. 4,000,000
- Government
- Governor
  - 1936-1938: Carlo Geloso
  - 1938: Armando Felsani
  - 1938-1941: Pietro Gazzera
- Historical era: Interwar period World War II
  - Created: 1 June 1936
  - Allied occupation: 6 July 1941
| Preceded by | Succeeded by |
| Ethiopian Empire | Ethiopian Empire |

Galla-Sidamo Governorate was one of the six governorates of Italian East Africa. It was formed in 1936 from parts of the conquered Ethiopian Empire following the Second Italo-Ethiopian War with the capital was Jimma. In November 1938 some territory of Galla-Sidamo in the Scioa region was given to the neighboring Addis Abeba Governorate, enlarging it to the Scioa Governorate.

The area bordering the Anglo-Egyptian Sudan was the stronghold of the Ethiopian resistance against the Italians until 1939, when it was practically pacified.

The Governorate of Galla-Sidamo was subdivided into:

- Baco
- del Oeste
- Borana
- Caffa & Ghimirra
- Gimma
- Guraghé & Cambattà
- Magi & Sciuro
- Ometo
- Sidamo
- Uollega & Gundrù

== See also ==
- List of governors of the Galla-Sidamo Governorate
- Italian Ethiopia

== Bibliography ==
- Beltrami, Vanni. "Italia d'oltremare. Storie dei territori italiani dalla conquista alla caduta." Edizioni Nuova Cultura. Roma, 2013 ISBN 978-88-6134-702-1
