= Amhara Governorate =

Governorate of Italian East Africa

Amhara Governorate Governatorato di Amara
- Governorate of Italian East Africa
- Coat of Arms

- Amhara (blue) within Italian East Africa
- Capital: Gondar
- Population
- ca. 2,000,000
- Government
- Governor
  - 1936–1937: Alessandro Pirzio Biroli
  - 1937–1939: Ottorino Mezzetti
  - 1937–1941: Luigi Frusci
  - 1941: Guglielmo Nasi
- Historical era: Interwar period World War II
  - Created: 1 June 1936
  - Allied occupation: 27 November 1941
| Preceded by | Succeeded by |
| Ethiopian Empire | Ethiopian Empire |

Amhara Governorate was one of the six governorates of Italian East Africa. Its capital was Gondar. It was formed in 1936 from parts of the conquered Ethiopian Empire following the Second Italo-Ethiopian War. It had a population of more than two million inhabitants (In 1940 11,200 were Italians settlers, mostly in the capital Gondar). In November 1938 some territory of Amhara in the Scioa region was given to the neighboring Addis Abeba Governorate, enlarging it to the Scioa Governorate.

The region was a stronghold of fierce Ethiopian resistance against the Italians. By 1940, the last areas of guerrilla activity was around Lake Tana and southern Gojjam, under the leadership of the degiac Mengesha Jembere and Belay Zeleke.

== Bibliography ==
- Antonicelli, Franco (1961) Trent'anni di storia italiana 1915–1945, Saggi series 295, Torino : Einaudi, 387 p. [in Italian]
- Barker, A. J. (1968). The Civilising Mission: The Italo-Ethiopian War 1935–6. London: Cassell. ISBN 978-0-304-93201-6.
- Del Boca, Angelo (1986) Italiani in Africa Orientale: La caduta dell'Impero, Biblioteca universale Laterza 186, Roma : Laterza, ISBN 88-420-2810-X [in Italian]
- Mockler, Anthony (1984). Haile Selassie's War: The Italian-Ethiopian Campaign, 1935–1941, New York : Random House, ISBN 0-394-54222-3

== See also ==
- Italian East Africa
- Italian Ethiopia
- List of governors of the Amhara Governorate
