= Prince Amedeo, Duke of Aosta =

Duke of Aosta, Commander in Italian East Africa (1898–1942)

Prince Amedeo
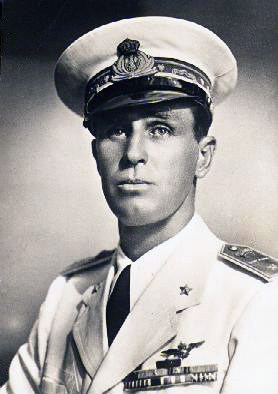
- Amedeo in the 1930s

Duke of Aosta
- In office 4 July 1931 – 3 March 1942
- Preceded by: Emanuele Filiberto
- Succeeded by: Aimone

3rd Governor-General of Italian East Africa 3rd Viceroy of Italian Ethiopia
- In office 21 December 1937 – 19 May 1941
- Monarch: Victor Emmanuel III
- Minister of the Colonies: Benito Mussolini; Attilio Teruzzi
- Preceded by: Rodolfo Graziani
- Succeeded by: Pietro Gazzera (acting)
- Born: 21 October 1898; Turin, Kingdom of Italy
- Died: 3 March 1942 (aged 43); Nairobi, Kenya Colony
- Spouse: Princess Anne of Orléans (m. 1927)
- Issue: Margherita, Archduchess of Austria-Este; Princess Maria Cristina
Names
- Amedeo Umberto Isabella Luigi Filippo Maria Giuseppe Giovanni
- House: Savoy
- Father: Prince Emanuele Filiberto, Duke of Aosta
- Mother: Princess Hélène of Orléans

Prince Amedeo, 3rd Duke of Aosta (Amedeo Umberto Isabella Luigi Filippo Maria Giuseppe Giovanni di Savoia-Aosta; 21 October 1898 – 3 March 1942) was the third Duke of Aosta and a first cousin once removed of the King of Italy, Victor Emmanuel III. During World War II, he was the Italian Viceroy of Italian East Africa (Africa Orientale Italiana, or AOI).

== Biography ==
Amedeo was born in Turin, Piedmont, to Prince Emanuele Filiberto, 2nd Duke of Aosta (son of Amadeo I of Spain and Princess Maria Vittoria), and Princess Hélène (daughter of Prince Philippe of Orléans and Princess Marie Isabelle of Orléans). As his patrilinal great-grandfather was King Victor Emmanuel II of Italy, he was a member of the House of Savoy. He was known from birth by the courtesy title of Duke of Apulia.

Amedeo was a very tall man (in stark contrast to the King, who was known to be quite short). According to Amedeo Guillet, he was once referred to by a journalist as "Your Highness" (which in Italian could also be interpreted to mean "your height"). The Duke replied in jest: "198 centimetres [6 ft 6 in]".

=== Education and early military career ===
Amedeo was educated at St David's College, Reigate, Surrey, in England. He cultivated British mannerisms, spoke Oxford English, and even enjoyed the pastimes of fox hunting and polo. Amedeo entered the Nunziatella, the military academy in Naples, joined the Italian Royal Army (Regio Esercito) and fought with distinction in the artillery during World War I. He left the army in 1921 and travelled widely in Africa.

Amedeo subsequently rejoined the Italian armed forces and became a pilot. In 1932, he joined the Italian Royal Air Force (Regia Aeronautica). Amedeo served under Marshal Rodolfo Graziani and Libyan Governor Pietro Badoglio during the later stages of the so-called "pacification of Libya" (1911 to 1932). Amedeo and his fellow airmen harried the Senussi forces of Omar Mukhtar from the sky. When hostilities in Libya came to an end in early 1932, much was made of the participation of the "Duke of Apulia" as the commander of the airmen who forced the Senussi to flee Libya and seek relief in Egypt. Amedeo, portrayed by the actor Sky du Mont, appears in several non-flying scenes with Graziani in the movie The Lion of the Desert, about the Italian conquest of Libya.

On 4 July 1931, upon the death of his father, Amedeo became the Duke of Aosta.

=== Viceroy and governor-general ===
In 1937, after the Italian conquest of Ethiopia during the Second Italo-Abyssinian War, the Duke of Aosta replaced Marshal Graziani as Viceroy and as Governor-General of Italian East Africa. It was generally conceded that he was a vast improvement over Graziani. As Viceroy and Governor-General, he was also the Commander-in-Chief of all Italian military forces in Eritrea, Ethiopia, and Somaliland.

=== World War II ===
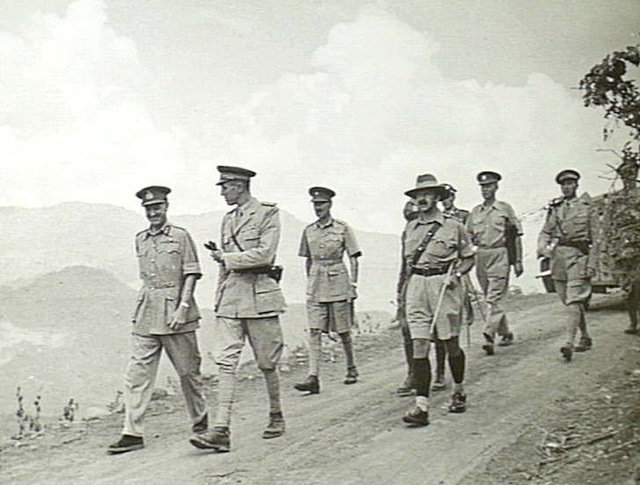
The Duke of Aosta surrenders to British officials.

When Italy declared war on the United Kingdom and France on 10 June 1940, he became the commander of the Italian forces in what is known as the East African Campaign of World War II. He oversaw the initial Italian advances into Sudan and Kenya and, in August, he oversaw the Italian invasion of British Somaliland.

In January 1941, the British launched a counter-invasion and the Italians went on the defensive in East Africa. The Italians fought throughout February. But, after fierce resistance, the Battle of Keren ended in Italian defeat, after which the rest of Eritrea, including the port of Massawa, fell quickly. On 31 January, he reported that the Italian military forces in East Africa were down to 67 operational aircraft with limited fuel stocks. With supplies running low and with no chance of re-supply, he opted to concentrate the remaining Italian forces into several strongholds: Gondar, Amba Alagi, Dessie, and Gimma. He himself commanded the 7,000 Italians at the mountain fortress of Amba Alagi. With his water supply compromised, surrounded, and besieged by 9,000 British and Commonwealth troops and more than 20,000 Ethiopian irregulars, he surrendered Amba Alagi on 18 May 1941. Due to the gallant resistance of the Italian garrison, the British allowed them to surrender with honours of war.

=== Death ===
Shortly after his surrender, he was interned in a prisoner-of-war camp in Nairobi, Kenya. He was placed in command of his fellow prisoners, but never saw the end of World War II. On 3 March 1942, shortly after his internment, he died at the prison camp, reportedly as a result of complications from both tuberculosis and malaria. Amedeo was succeeded by his brother, Aimone, 4th Duke of Aosta.

=== Aftermath ===
Amedeo was well known and highly regarded for being a gentleman. In one instance, before he fled his headquarters at Addis Ababa, he wrote a note to the British to thank them in advance for protecting the women and children in the cities.

Count Galeazzo Ciano, Italian Foreign Minister under his father-in-law, Italian dictator Benito Mussolini, paid Amedeo a high compliment in his diaries. Upon being given the news of the Duke's death, Ciano wrote, "So dies the image of a Prince and an Italian. Simple in his ways, broad in outlook, and humane in spirit."

Emperor Haile Selassie of Ethiopia was also impressed by the respect and care that the Duke of Aosta showed to the exiled Emperor's personal property left behind in Addis Ababa. In a gesture of thanks, the Emperor during his state visit to Italy in 1953 invited the widowed Duchess of Aosta to tea during his stay in Milan, but was then informed by the Italian government that receiving the Duchess would cause offence to the Italian Republic, and so the Emperor cancelled the visit. Instead he invited the 5th Duke of Aosta to Ethiopia in the mid-1960s, and accorded him all the protocol due to visiting royalty.

== Family ==
Amedeo was married on 5 November 1927, in Naples, to his first cousin Princess Anne of Orléans (1906–1986), daughter of Prince Jean, Duke of Guise, and Princess Isabelle of Orléans.

They had two daughters:

- Princess Margherita of Savoy-Aosta (7 April 1930 at Capodimonte Palace – 10 January 2022 at Basel); married Robert, Archduke of Austria-Este (son of the last Austrian emperor, Charles I) on 28 December 1953. They had five children.
- Princess Maria Cristina of Savoy-Aosta (12 September 1933 at Miramare Castle – 18 November 2023 at São Paulo); married Prince Casimir of Bourbon-Two Sicilies, son of Prince Gabriel of Bourbon-Two Sicilies and his second wife, Princess Cecylia Lubomirska, on 29 January 1967. They had four children.

== Cultural depictions ==
Prince Amedeo's time in Italian Cyrenaica was depicted in the 1981 film Lion of the Desert; Amedeo was played by Sky du Mont.

== See also ==
- Colonial heads of Italian East Africa
- East African Campaign (World War II)
- History of Libya as Italian Colony
- Kingdom of Italy (1861–1946)

== Ancestry ==
Ancestors of Prince Amedeo, Duke of Aosta

8. Victor Emmanuel II of Italy
4. Amadeo I of Spain
9. Archduchess Adelaide of Austria
2. Prince Emanuele Filiberto, Duke of Aosta
10. Carlo Emanuele dal Pozzo, Prince of Cisterna
5. Maria Vittoria dal Pozzo, Princess of Cisterna
11. Countess Louise de Mérode-Westerloo
1. Prince Amedeo, Duke of Aosta
12. Prince Ferdinand Philippe, Duke of Orléans
6. Prince Philippe, Count of Paris
13. Duchess Helene of Mecklenburg-Schwerin
3. Princess Hélène of Orléans
14. Prince Antoine, Duke of Montpensier
7. Princess Marie Isabelle of Orléans
15. Infanta Luisa Fernanda of Spain

Prince Amedeo, Duke of Aosta House of Savoy Born: 21 October 1898 Died: 3 March 1942
Government offices
Preceded by The Marquis of Neghelli	Governor-General of Italian East Africa; 1937–1941	Succeeded by Pietro Gazzera
Italian nobility
Preceded by Emanuele Filiberto	Duke of Aosta and Apulia; 1931–1942	Succeeded by Aimone
