= Guglielmo Nasi =

Royal Italian Soldier

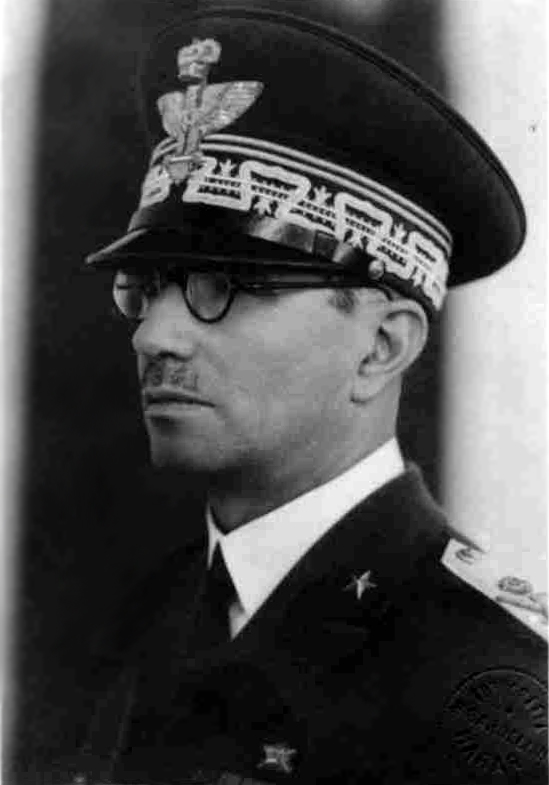
- Generale Guglielmo Nasi
- Born: 21 February 1879; Civitavecchia, Lazio, Kingdom of Italy
- Died: 21 September 1971 (aged 92); Modena, Emilia-Romagna, Italy
- Military career
- Allegiance: Italy
- Branch: Royal Italian Army
- Service years: 1912–1945
- Commands: Chief of Staff for the Colonial Troops in Africa; Vice-Governor of Cyrenaica; Governor of Harar; Governor of Shewa; Vice-Governor of Italian East Africa
- Conflicts: First World War; Second Italo-Ethiopian War; World War II: East African Campaign; Invasion of British Somaliland; Battle of Gondar
- Awards: Colonial Order of the Star of Italy; Order of Saints Maurice and Lazarus; Military Order of Savoia; Order of Vittorio Veneto; Silver Medal of Military Valor (4 times); Maurician medal Military Career Medal (10 years); Commemorative Medal World War I 1915 - 18 (4 years of campaign); Commemorative Medal to the Italian Unity; Commemorative Medal to the Allied Victory
- Other work: UN Commissar for Somalia

Guglielmo Ciro Nasi (21 February 1879 – 21 September 1971) was an Italian general who fought in the Second Italo-Abyssinian War and World War II.

Although Nasi was listed as a war criminal by the post-war Ethiopian government, Italian historian Angelo Del Boca, usually very severe in judging the behaviour of the Italian army in the colonies, considers him the best officer of the Regio Esercito in East Africa. Solomon Getahun supports this view of Nasi, noting that his behaviour towards the inhabitants of Gondar and the adjoining territories helped him to sustain the fight against both British and Ethiopian forces as long as he did.

== Biography ==
Nasi was born in Civitavecchia, Lazio. In 1912 he was sent to Libya as a Captain with the 8th Artillery Regiment and the following year was decorated for valour at the action at Safsaf. He fought in the First World War and ended the conflict as a Lieutenant-Colonel. From 1924–1928, he was the military representative of the Italian Regio Esercito (Royal Army) in Paris.

In 1928, Nasi was sent to the Italian colonies as Chief-of-Staff for the Colonial Troops and was Vice-Governor of Cyrenaica in 1934–1935, Governor of Harar from 1936–1939, and Governor of Shewa in 1939–1940. He also served as a Vice-Governor of Italian East Africa from 1939. Nasi promoted a moral reformation of the military and civil administration and he showed notable skills in dealing with indigenous chiefs.

In April 1936, during the Second Italo-Abyssinian War, Nasi commanded the left column of three columns during GeneralRodolfo Graziani′s advance on the southern front. Most of Nasi's troops were Libyans.

After the beginning of World War II, Nasi led the Italian conquest of British Somaliland in August 1940. He invaded British Somaliland and with the advantage of air cover and tanks, forced the defending British and Commonwealth forces to evacuate by sea to Aden after defeating the main body of the British army at the Battle of Tug Argan from 11 to 15 August.

During the East African Campaign, Nasi led the last stand of an Italian garrison in East Africa. On 6 July, after Duke Amedeo of Aosta and General Pietro Gazzera surrendered, Nasi became the acting Governor-General of Italian East Africa. In early 1941, during the British counter-offensive, Nasi was forced to retreat to the stronghold of Gondar. While he held out long after other Italian strongholds had fallen, Nasi finally surrendered his stronghold of Gondar on 28 November 1941.

Nasi was sent to Kenya as a prisoner of war. After the death of Duke Amedeo, he was responsible for the 60,000 Italian prisoners kept there. Nasi returned to Italy in 1945. Four years later, he was appointed as commissary for Somalia when the latter was assigned to United Nations suzerainty. Nasi died at Modena in 1971.

== See also ==
- Second Italo-Abyssinian War
- East African Campaign (World War II)
- Italian conquest of British Somaliland
- Battle of Gondar

== Bibliography ==
- Getahun, Solomon Addis (2005). History of the City of Gondar. Trenton, NJ: Africa World Press. ISBN 978-1-56-902195-8.

Government offices
Preceded by Pietro Gazzera	(acting) Governor-General of Italian East Africa; 6 July – 27 November 1941	Succeeded by (none)
Preceded by Rodolfo Graziani	Vice-Governor of Cyrenaica (honorary); June 1934 – April 1935	Succeeded by (none)
