= German Motorized Company =

Compagnia Autocarrata Tedesca
- The German Motorized Company with a Schwarzlose Mod. 07/12 machine gun
- Active: 6 October 1940 – 19 May 1941
- Country: Nazi Germany
- Allegiance: Kingdom of Italy
- Branch: Royal Italian Army
- Size: Company
- Equipment: Carcano 1891 rifles and carbines Breda 30 and Schwarzlose machine guns
- Engagements: World War II: East African Campaign; Battle of Agordat; Battle of Keren; Battle of Amba Alagi

Commanders
- Notable commanders: First Lieutenant (Oberleutnant) Gustav Hamel

The German Motorized Company (Italian: Compagnia Autocarrata Tedesca, German: Deutsche Motorisierte Kompanie) was a small military unit formed during the East African Campaign during World War II.

== Service history ==
The German Motorized Company was formed from about 138 Germans who had fled from British-held Kenya and Tanganyika. A large number of the Germans arrived in Italian East Africa on the Italian ship Piave before Italy entered World War II. After 10 June 1940, once Italian dictator Benito Mussolini declared war on Britain and France, the Germans from the Piave volunteered to fight for the Italians in East Africa. Other Germans stranded in Italian East Africa were drafted for the unit as well.

On 2 July 1940, the "German Motorized Company" was formed. The unit trained in Asmara, Eritrea. Most of the volunteers had little to no military background. In addition to being "motorized" (or truck transportable), the unit included some improvised armored cars.

The Italian radio station in Addis Ababa, capital of Abyssinia, broadcast news about the German Motorized Company. The existence of this unit was of great propaganda value to the Italians.

In November 1940, the German Motorized Company first saw action in the border area between Eritrea and the Sudan. The Germans were active at the Battle of Agordat and the Battle of Keren (Cheren) in 1941. The German Motorized Company provided cover during the retreat from Keren, Eritrea, to Asmara.

About twenty men of the unit survived the loss of Eritrea suffered by Italy. This small group of men was with Amedeo, Duke of Aosta, at Amba Alagi during one of the final stages of the East African Campaign.

The company was presented with a special triangular flag by Lieutenant-General Luigi Frusci, the Italian Governor of Eritrea. The flag displayed the flag of Italy on one side and the German Swastika flag on the other side.

== Commanders ==
- First Lieutenant (Oberleutnant) Gustav Hamel

== Order of battle ==
- 3 x Platoon
  - 2-3 x Squads (each)

== See also ==
- Battle of Keren
- East African Campaign (World War II)
