= Battle of Culqualber =

1941 WWII battle in Ethiopia

- Part of East African campaign
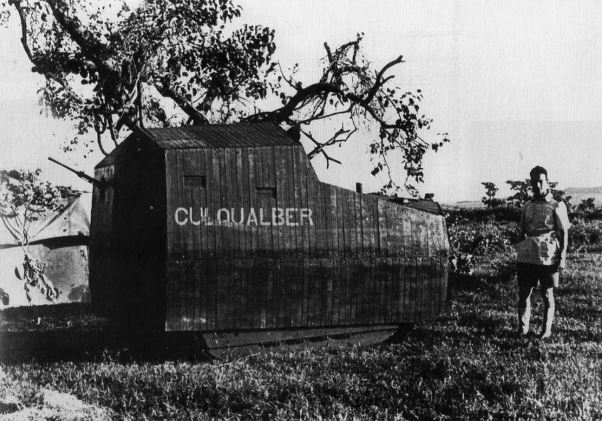
- Makeshift armoured tractor used by Italian forces at Culqualber, nicknamed hedgehog
Date	6 August – 21 November 1941
Location	Culqualber Pass, Italian East Africa 12°36′N 37°28′E
Result	Allied victory

Belligerents
United Kingdom; Sudan; Gold Coast; Kenya; South Africa; Ethiopian Empire	Italy; Italian East Africa

Commanders and leaders
Colin Blackden	Augusto Ugolini (POW)

Strength
22,500 men; c. 100 aircraft	2,900 men; 2 aircraft

Casualties and losses
	1,003 killed (513 Italian and 490 Askari); 1,900 prisoners including 804 wounded (404 Italian and 400 Askari); about 100 civilian dead; (Note: About 200 wives and relatives of the Ascari colonial soldiers had followed them in Culqualber, and about one hundred of them were killed during the battle and bombing.)
- Culqualber, near Gondar, a town in the Amhara Region of Ethiopia

The Battle of Culqualber was fought near Culqualber Pass, Ethiopia, from 6 August to 21 November 1941, between Italian and colonial forces and British Commonwealth forces. Along with the Battle of Gondar, it marked the end of conventional warfare in the East Africa Campaign.

== Background ==
In 1941, following the Italian defeats at Keren and Amba Alagi, military operations in Italian East Africa moved towards the Amhara region, where General Guglielmo Nasi had organised his defence on the main stronghold of Gondar and a series of secondary strongholds around it.

The surrounding terrain was characterised by irregular heights, with flat or conical summits (ambas), intersected by deep ravines that were hardly traversable on foot. Here, the key point for the whole defence system was located in the Culqualber Pass, where passed a rough road, that was the only available route for Commonwealth forces, which headed towards Gondar with artillery and armoured units.

== Preparations ==
On 6 August 1941, Nasi sent a mixed force to guard Culqualber Pass. The force included the 1st Carabinieri Mobilized Group, with two companies of Italian veterans (200 men) and one company of Zaptié (160 men) under the command of Colonel Augusto Ugolini and Major Alfredo Serranti; the CCXL Blackshirt Battalion (five companies), with 675 blackshirts under Seniore (Major) Alberto Cassoli and the LXVII Colonial Battalion (four companies), with 620 askari under Major Carlo Garbieri. The garrison was completed by the 43rd battery (three old 77/28 mm guns and 40 Italian gunners) and the 44th battery (two 70/15 mm howitzers and 34 Eritrean gunners); a platoon of engineers, with 88 men (65 Italians and 23 askari) and a field hospital, with two medics and a chaplain. The five guns available were obsolete and dated back to the First World War, the howitzers being war prizes from the Austro-Hungarian Army. The garrison was also joined by a small number of askari from Debra Tabor; when that garrison surrendered in July 1941, some ascari had refused surrender and undertook a 106 km (66 mi) march towards Culqualber. One of them, Muntaz Unatù Endisciau, was captured by Ethiopian guerrillas, escaped, was mortally wounded while crossing a minefield and died after having his battalion's banner delivered to the Italian garrison. Endisciau was one of the two colonial soldiers who were awarded the Gold Medal of Military Valor.

The Italian and colonial forces at Culqualber Pass numbered about 2,100 men overall. A secondary stronghold was at Fercaber Pass, near Lake Tana, with the XIV Blackshirt Battalion (five companies and 600 men, under Seniore Lasagni), the 1st Artillery Battery (three 70/15 mm howitzers and about 30 Italian gunners), the 6th Colonial Machine Gunners Company (130 askaris), a platoon of engineers, a medical officer and a military chaplain. The garrison of Fercaber consisted of 800 men; along with the soldiers were about 200 African women and children were at Culqualber and Fercaber; they were the wives and children of the askari, whom, following their custom, had followed their husbands and supported them.

After ascertaining the situation, the Carabinieri command decided to entrench its troops on the "Costone dei Roccioni", an overhanging ridge that dominated both the road to Gondar on the north and the Dessie–Debra Tabor side on the south (with the "Km. 39 Spur"). The command was placed in barycentric position. During the subsequent weeks, the Italians fortified their positions (especially on the Costone, which lacked any kind of fortifications) by using the trunks of the trees found in the ravines. Caverns with multiple embrasures were dug in the rock of the ridge, to allow to fire in all directions. Some tractors and caterpillars were turned into improvised armoured fighting vehicles, armed with Schwarzlose machine guns and Fiat 35 machine guns.

== Siege ==
Beginning on the end of August, Ethiopian irregulars started ambushes aimed at cutting communications and supply lines between Gondar and Culqualber. Ugolini ordered some sorties in retaliation. On 4 September, some askari and blackshirt companies made a nocturnal sortie and attacked the Ethiopian encampment, capturing a large quantity of weapons and ammunition. The British forces retaliated with a heavy bombardment of the Italian positions.

During September the Commonwealth forces, coming from south and readying for the attack, positioned themselves along the Guarnò river and on the Danguriè heights, directly threatening the "Km. 39 Spur" positions. By then the Carabinieri defensive preparations were completed but the inflow of Commonwealth forces in the Gumera valley isolated the garrison of Culqualber from the rest of the Italian defence system, thus starting the siege. At first the British forces tested the Italian defensive perimeter with patrol actions, then, after ascertaining the reaction, they advanced on the flanks, avoiding battle and encircling both Culqualber and Fercaber.

The encirclement of the Italians on Culqualber Pass was complete; their supply lines were cut off and they soon found themselves in hardships, having to ration their food stores; often the only meal consisted in bargutta, a gross flour obtained from corn, fodder and quadruped feed. The lack of drinking water posed a more serious problem; after the Commonwealth forces secured their control over the Guarnò and Gumerà, the two rivers which provided water to the Italians, the only water source for the garrison became a small spring, whose flow rate was insufficient for their needs. Carabinieri attempted to reach the rivers several times to retrieve some water but they became easy targets for the British fire, which caused heavy losses. A method for obtaining small quantities of water consisted in spreading towels on the ground at night and retrieving them in the morning, when they were wet, thanks to high nocturnal humidity. The Italians were aware that, as time passed, they would grow weaker and weaker, while the besiegers strengthened their forces; from mid-October they therefore organised a series of sorties aimed at both lightening British pressure on their stronghold, and capturing weapons and foodstuffs.

=== Amba Mariam ===
The first Italian sortie (and also the most important and bloodiest one), took place on 18 October and was directed against a position on the Amba Mariam height, 15 km (9.3 mi) north of Culqualber, where the besiegers had placed encampments and logistic depots. The sortie succeeded, allowing the Carabinieri, Zaptiè and the 4th Company of LXVII Colonial Battalion (Sub-Lieutenant Giovanni Pinat) to inflict heavy losses and to capture a considerable amount of weapons, ammunition and foodstuffs; exploiting their initial success, the Carabinieri and colonials then carried out a bayonet charge and overran the British defenders, which withdrew from Amba Mariam. Colonel Ugolini then ordered Major Serranti to secure the newly captured positions of Amba Mariam with the men who had carried out the attack; Ugolini then led Zaptiè in pursuit of the retreating British defenders, pushing them beyond the Gumera river.

The British forces soon launched a powerful counter-attack from east; Serranti's men resisted till the return of Ugolini, then they retreated from Amba Mariam and returned to their lines, bringing with them their wounded and their booty of weapons, ammunition and food. 36 Italians and colonials were killed and 31 wounded in the fight for Amba Mariam, whereas Allied casualties amounted to 150–200 men. This operation temporarily lightened the British pressure on Culqualber and provided the Italians with food and supplies that allowed them to lighten the rationing and to prolong their resistance.

=== British counter-offensive ===
During the following days, the British commander, Brigadier General Colin Frederick Blackden, increased his forces in the area, transferring there several armoured units, some thousands British soldiers and several thousands Ethiopian irregulars. Italian positions were heavily bombarded with both aircraft and artillery and the Allied also started actions of psychological warfare, dropping leaflets with demands to surrender, sending Copt priests to persuade the defenders to surrender, and sending messengers who also asked for surrender, until Serranti threatened to fire on them.

Ground attacks and air strikes escalated from 21 October. The Allied enjoyed complete air domination; only two Fiat CR.42 were left to face about a hundred aircraft of the Royal Air Force and South African Air Force which continuously bombed and strafed the Italian positions. One of the two CR.42s, piloted by Sub-Lieutenant Ildebrando Malavolta, was engaged over Culqualber by two Gloster Gladiator and shot down by Lieutenant Lancelot Charles Henry Hope (3rd Squadron SAAF) on 24 October.

A heavy assault was attempted against the northern defences (manned by the 3rd Company of the CCXL Blackshirt Battalion and by the 2nd Carabinieri Battalion); the Italian lines ceded in some points but these were immediately recaptured by Italian and colonial counter-attacks.

=== November ===
A series of new Allied attacks were launched during November 1941:

On 2 November, a bombing destroyed the Italian field hospital, hitting also the cemetery. Three days later, a heavy Commonwealth-Ethiopian attack on the southern side of the stronghold was halted by the 1st Carabinieri Company, supported by artillery. During the night of 12 November, a new strong British assault began, this time after some heavy bombings, a series of assaults were launched all day on 13 November. The battle often turned into hand-to-hand combat, and the Italian defenders repelled the Uollo irregulars and the Kikuyu and Sudanese irregulars towards the ravines of "Costone dei Roccioni". The battle ended in the evening with the failure of the Commonwealth attack.

On 14 November the Allied attacks paused, and the Italians exploited this break to care for the wounded, bury the dead, and have their first hot meal in days. Between 15 and 19 November the RAF and SAAF constantly bombed the Italian positions, and the ground forces renewed their attacks (on 18 November, the Italian anti-aircraft guns claimed nine aircraft shot down); British forces managed to capture some positions, which were however recaptured by Carabinieri and Zaptiè in hand-to-hand combat. Italians volunteer to make some infiltration actions to lower the pressure of the attacks. Poliuto Penzo, one of the volunteers, will obtain the Medaglia d'Oro al valor Militare because of the heroism shown during these days.

=== Final assault and fall ===
Starting on 18 November, bombings on Culqualber and Fercaber were further intensified. On 20 November, the Italian positions were bombed by 57 aircraft, and an Allied force of about 22,500 men, supported by armoured units, was prepared for the final assault. The Allied forces attacking from the north were three battalions of the King's African Rifles (25th East African Brigade), several machine gun companies, six artillery batteries, a Sudanese company and about 6,500 Ethiopian irregulars, for a total of 13,000 men under Brigadier W. A. L. James. The forces attacking from the south numbered about 9,500 men under Lieutenant Colonel Collins, consisting of two South African battalions, a Gold Coast artillery battery with six guns, a South African battery, several machine gun companies and about 3,500 Ethiopian irregulars. The Italian garrison, after the losses suffered in the previous months, were down to 1,500–1,600 soldiers and officers still able to fight.

The attack started at 03:00 on 21 November. Allied forces attacked from three sides, with infantry supported by tanks (including Mk III light tanks of the South African Light Armoured Detachment), artillery fire and air strikes. Both on "Km. 39 Spur", defended by the 1st Carabinieri Company, and on the less defendable "Costone dei Roccioni" (where fortifications were weaker), held by the 2nd Carabinieri Company, fierce hand-to-hand combat erupted between attackers and defenders. Carabinieri fought with bayonets and hand grenades when they ran out of ammunition, and they counterattacked numerous times to recapture lost positions, but both battalions were annihilated, as was the Blackshirt battalion of Major Cassoli. The three Italian battalion commanders, Garbieri, Serranti and Cassoli, were all killed in the fighting.

== Aftermath ==
The battle ended in the evening of 21 November 1941, with the capture of Culqualber by the Allied forces. Gondar fell less than a week later, thus ending the last organised resistance by Italian regular units in East Africa. Of the 2,900 men of the garrisons of Culqualber and Fercarber, 513 Italians and 490 Askaris were killed and 404 Italians and 400 Askaris were wounded. About 100 of the 200 wives and children of the Askaris lost their lives. All the survivors, including Ugolini, were taken prisoner. Commonwealth and Ethiopian losses are not known. The Corps of Carabinieri was awarded the Gold Medal of Military Valor for its role in the defence of Culqualber.

== See also ==
- List of British military equipment of World War II
- List of Second Italo-Ethiopian War weapons of Ethiopia-Arbegnoch used Ethiopian and captured Italian weapons.
- List of Italian Army equipment in World War II

== Bibliography ==
Notes

citations

References

- La battaglia di Culqualber
- Account of the battle on the website of the Carabinieri
