= RAF Castel Benito =

Airport near Tripoli, Libya

RAF Castel Benito RAF Idris
- IATA: none; ICAO: none

Summary
- Owner/Operator: Desert Air Force (DAF)
- Location: Near: Tripoli, Libya
- Built: 1938
- Coordinates: 32°40′10″N 013°09′24″E

Map
- Location of RAF Castel Benito

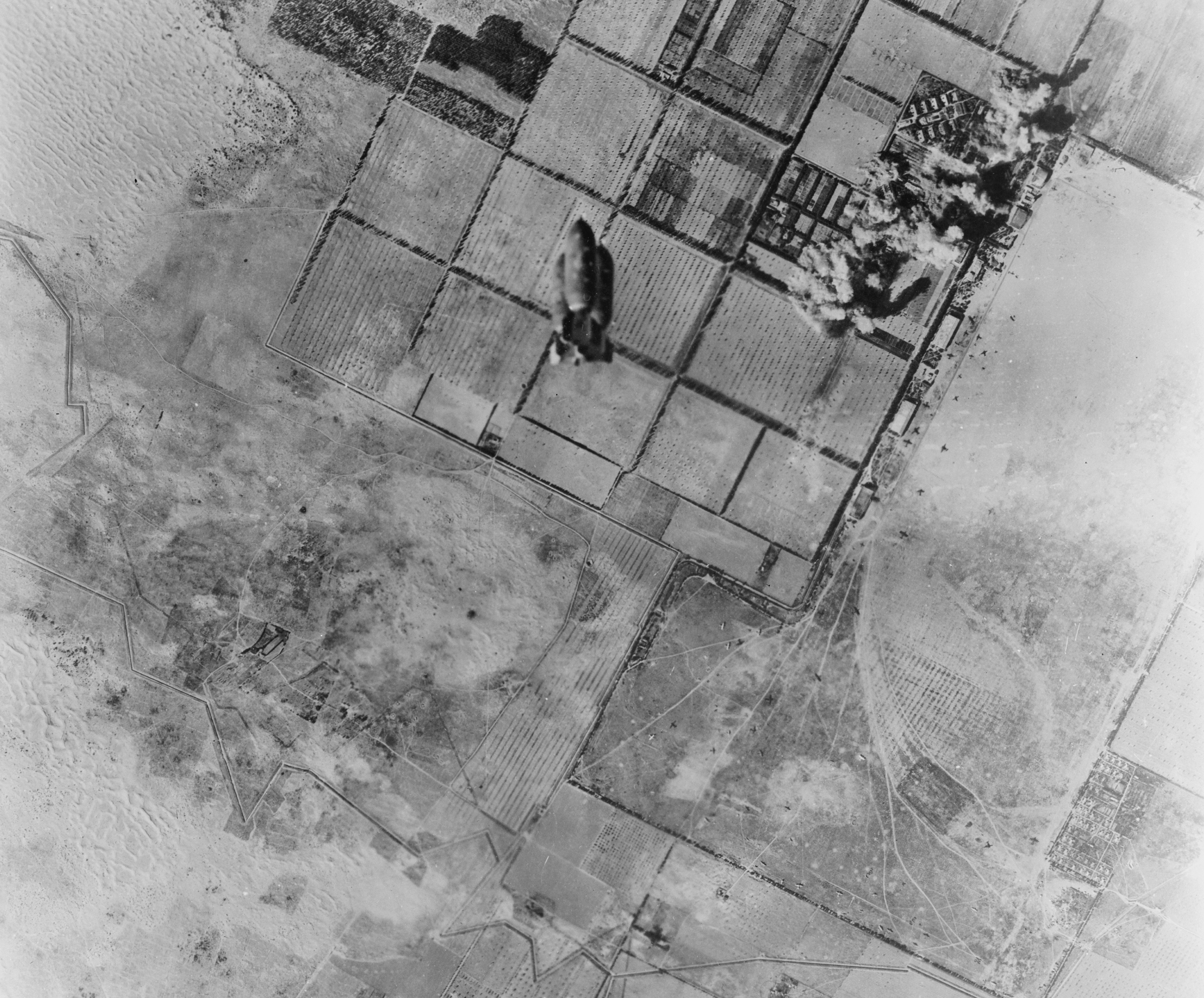
Castel Benito airport under attack in 1943

RAF Castel Benito (called originally in Italian "Tripoli-Castel Benito Airport") was an airport of Tripoli created by the Italians in Italian Libya. Originally, it was a small military airport named Castel Benito, but it was enlarged in the late 1930s and was later used by the British RAF after 1943. It was called RAF Castel Benito by the Allies.

RAF Castel Benito (later RAF Idris) was a Royal Air Force station near Tripoli in Libya between 1943 and 1966.

== History ==
- 1934: A Regia Aeronautica (Italian Air Force) airfield was created on the south edge of Italian Tripoli. It was the operational base for the "15° Stormo da bombardamento" with Savoia Marchetti SM. 79 and SM.81 as well as the "13° Gruppo da caccia" with Fiat CR.32 and CR.42.
- Shortly before World War II: The first units of Italian parachutists were trained and formed there. The first Italian Military Parachute School was there. The first troops trained were two Libyan battalions, the Libyan Parachute Battalion and the 1st National Libyan Parachute Battalion, of the Royal Colonial Corps.
- 1938: The Italian Libya governor Italo Balbo enlarged the military airfield into Tripoli-Castel Benito Airport (located 33 km south of Tripoli) and created an international airport for civilians served mainly by Ala Littoria, the official Italian airline: the Aeroporto di Tripoli-Castel Benito. The airport was connected to Rome by the "Linee Aeree Transcontinentali Italiane" (LATI), that ran a postal (and civilian service) to Africa, Asia and South America from Italy. The new airport had direct flights to Tunis and Malta, run with Savoia-Marchetti SM-73 of "Ala littoria". Castel Benito airport was connected with internal airports of Libya, such as Benghazi (Benina International Airport), Ghadames (Ghadames Airport), Sabha (Sabha Air Base), and Kufra (Kufra Airport). Another flight served by "Ala Littoria" was towards the Africa Orientale Italiana, with more than 4000 km: it was used mainly for military transport and mail service and was created in 1935, from Tripoli to Kassala (Sudan) and Asmara in Italian Eritrea. It was served by the Caproni Ca.308 Borea, with capacity for a crew of 2 but with only 6 passengers.[7]
- 1938: Air France started a regular flight from Marseille to Tripoli, later enlarged to Benghazi and Damascus.
- 1938: The Ala Littoria's international flights from the new civilian airport were:
  - Rome – Malta – Tripoli
  - Rome – Tunisi – Tripoli
  - Rome – Tripoli – Benghazi
- Spring 1939: A flight was started to Eritrea, Ethiopia and Somalia: Rome – Tripoli (Benghazi) – Cairo – Khartoum – Asmara – Addis Ababa – Mogadishu (nearly 7000 km)
- 1939: A passenger service with international travels was started by Ala Littoria to Rome (Italy) and Addis Ababa (Ethiopia and Africa Orientale Italiana): it was one of the first intercontinental flights in world history and was called Linea dell'Impero. The service was done (using mainly the Benghazi airport, but even the Tripoli-Castel Benito airport) with Savoia-Marchetti SM-83 carrying nearly 30 passengers.
- Summer 1939: The possibility was experimented of direct flights between Libya and Eritrea, bypassing Egypt and Sudan controlled by the United Kingdom. Bruno Mussolini (a son of Benito Mussolini), an experienced aviator, flew direct from Castel Benito airport to Kufra airport (near the desert border Libya-Sudan) and to Asmara in Italian Eritrea: this new route was used by military airplanes after World War II started.
- 1939: More and more attracted by the idea of establishing a similar regular service between Italy and Italian East Africa, Bruno Mussolini (in the meantime appointed general manager of LATI) and his staff carried out a long technical cruise with their SM83-ATTE to Tripoli and the Kufra Oasis (Libya), Asmara, Massaua, Gura and Agordat (Eritrea). The voyage proved to be very useful to learn those flight experiences necessary for the future war missions. The airport was used also as a military base, where some Savoia-Marchetti S-74 operated successfully as civilian transport airplanes.
- 1 September 1939: World War II started.

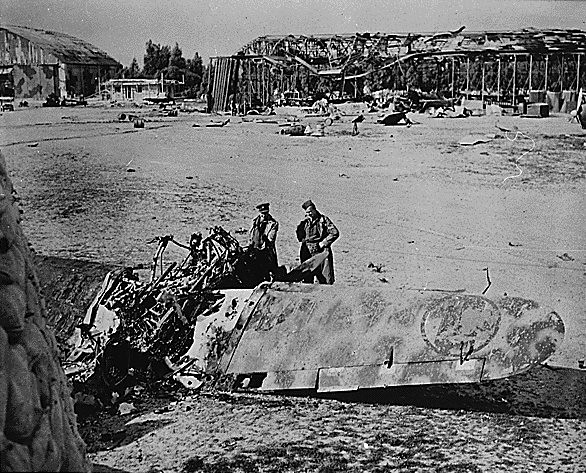
Wrecked plane and hangars in 1942

- November/December 1941 and December 1942/January 1943: The most destructive of many Allied air raids on the airport.
- 7 January 1943: The last of these airplanes, a Savoia-Marchetti S.74, did the last flight to Italy from Tripoli-Castel Benito airport before the British Army arrived.
- 23 January 1943: The British Army took Tripoli. The airfield was renamed RAF Castel Benito and was used by a number of Allied operational squadrons involved in the desert war and in the Tunisia battles, sometimes for only a few days or weeks at a time.
- Post-War: The airfield was used as a staging post for flights to and from Central and Southern Africa.
- 1951: The station was renamed Tripoli Idris Airport. The name was chosen to honour the Libyan King Idris at the request of the Libyan government. The station was used as a staging post for flights to and from the United Kingdom to the Middle East and Far East. It was also used in the 1950s as a base for aircraft using the Libyan Desert bombing ranges for practice.
- 1960s: The station was used by the UK Royal Air Force for Valiant refuelling tankers. These gave fuel to aircraft flying to and from the UK, aiming to land at airfields further to the East. The tanker aircraft then landed back at Idris having given fuel to the aircraft on the long-range flight
- September 1969: The station was closed (see also Kingdom of Libya#Foreign policy) when Libya became a republic. The airfield is now known as Tripoli International Airport.

== Units and aircraft ==
Unit	Dates	Aircraft	Variant	Notes
No. 6 Squadron RAF	1943	Hawker Hurricane	IID	Only stayed for six days
No. 73 Squadron RAF	1951	de Havilland Vampire	FB9	
No. 73 Squadron RAF	1952	de Havilland Vampire	FB9	(RAF Idris)
No. 89 Squadron RAF	1943	Bristol Beaufighter	VIF	
No. 92 Squadron RAF	1943	Supermarine Spitfire	VB and VC	
No. 108 Squadron RAF	1943-1944	Bristol Beaufighter	VIF	Detached aircraft from RAF Luqa
No. 112 Squadron RAF	1943	Curtiss Kittyhawk	III	
No. 117 Squadron RAF	1943	Lockheed Hudson and Douglas Dakota		
No. 145 Squadron RAF	1943	Supermarine Spitfire	VB	Detached from Wadi Suri later based
No. 185 Squadron RAF	1952	de Havilland Vampire	FB5	(RAF Idris)
No. 208 Squadron RAF	1951	Gloster Meteor	FR9	Detached aircraft from Abu Sueir
No. 250 Squadron RAF	1943	Curtiss Kittyhawk	III	
No. 260 Squadron RAF	1943	Curtiss Kittyhawk	III	
No. 283 Squadron RAF	1944-1946	Vickers Warwick	I	Detached aircraft from Hal Far
No. 294 Squadron RAF	1943-1944	Vickers Wellington	IC	
No. 318 Squadron RAF	1944	Supermarine Spitfire	VC	
No. 417 Squadron RCAF	1943	Supermarine Spitfire	VC	
No. 450 Squadron RAAF	1943	Curtiss Kittyhawk	III	
No. 601 Squadron RAF	1943	Supermarine Spitfire	VC	
No. 651 Squadron RAF	1943	Auster	I	
No. 651 Squadron RAF	1948-1950	Auster		Based but later detached from Ismailia
No. 680 Squadron RAF	1943	Various (Electra/Spitfire/Hurricane)		Detached aircraft from LG219 (Photo Reconnaissance Unit)

== Bibliography ==
- Abate, Rosario. Dal Borea ai Libeccio (Ca.308-Ca.318). Edizioni dell'Ateneo & Bizzarri. Milano, 1978
- Ferrari, Paolo. L'aeronautica italiana. Una storia del Novecento. Franco Angeli Storia ed. Milano, 2005 ISBN 88-464-5109-0.
- Maravigna, Pietro. Come abbiamo perduto la guerra in Africa. Editoriale Tosi. Roma, 1949.
- Rosselli, Alberto. The air links between Italy and Eastern Africa.June 1940-November 1941 Nuova Aurora Edizioni. Firenze, 2012

Thompson, Jonathan W. (1963). Italian Civil and Military aircraft 1930-1945 Aero Publishers Inc. New York, 1963 ISBN 0-8168-6500-0.

== See also ==
- List of former Royal Air Force stations
- Tripoli International Airport
- Ala Littoria
- LATI
- Linea dell'Impero
- Ascari del Cielo Paratroops
