= Castel Benito =

Former airport in Italian Libya in the 1930s–1940s

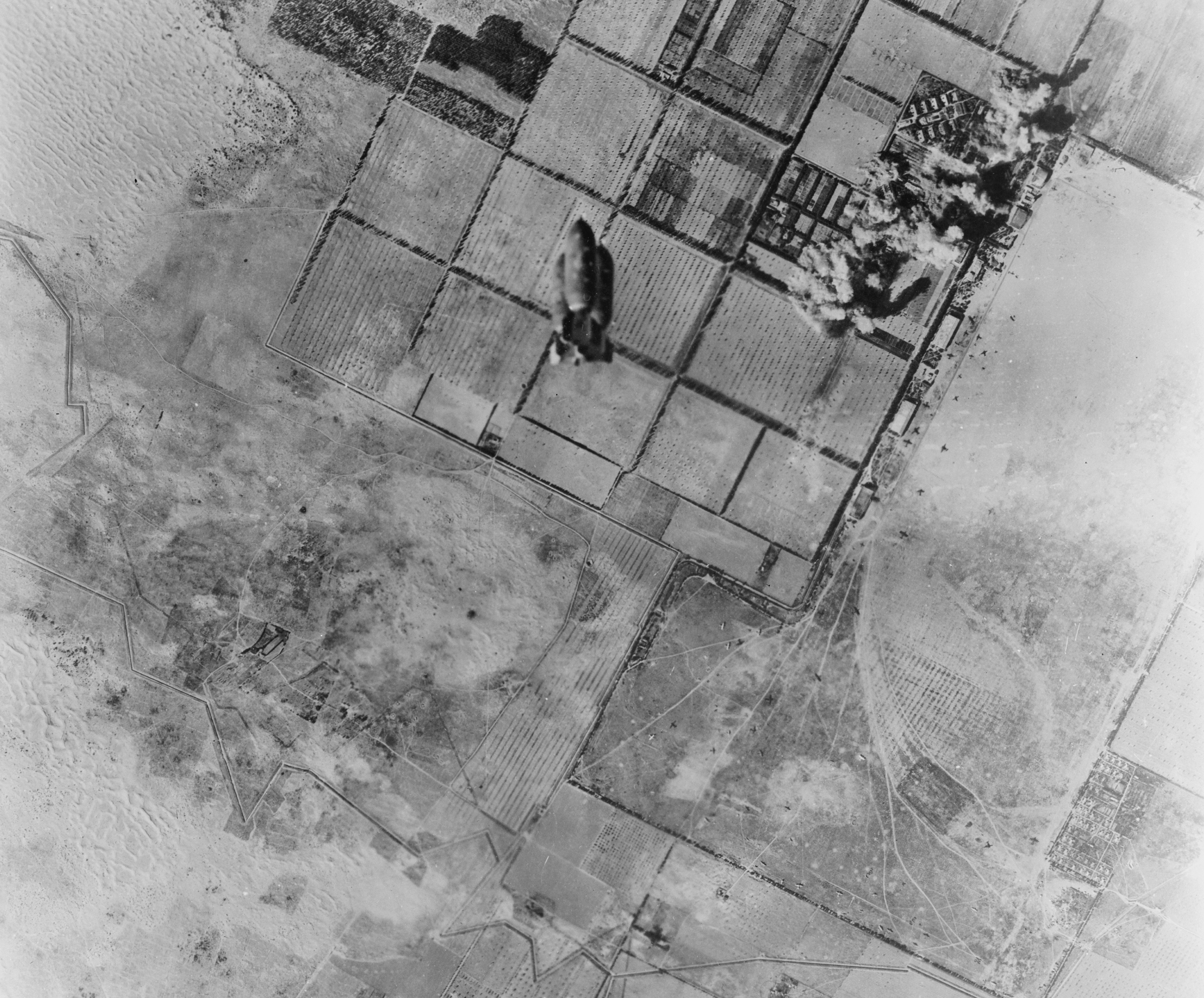
Castel Benito airport under attack in 1943

Castel Benito (called originally in Italian "Tripoli-Castel Benito aeroporto") was an airport of Tripoli created by the Italians in Italian Libya in the early 1930s. It was called RAF Castel Benito by the Allies after 1943.

== History ==
Originally, it was a small military airport, but it was enlarged in the late 1930s (and was later used by the British RAF after 1943).

=== Castel Benito aeroporto ===
Originally, Tripoli-Castel Benito Airport was a Regia Aeronautica (Italian Royal Air Force) airfield created in 1934 in the southern outskirts of Italian Tripoli. It was the operational base for the "15° Stormo da bombardamento" with Savoia Marchetti SM. 79 and SM.81 as well as the "13° Gruppo da caccia" with Fiat CR.32 and CR.42.

Later, the first units of Italian parachutists were trained and formed shortly before the Second World War. The first Italian Military Parachute School was at the airport. The first troops trained were two Libyan battalions, the Libyan Parachute Battalion and the 1st National Libyan Parachute Battalion of the Royal Colonial Corps. Successively was created a paratrooper battalion with Italian volunteers, that later was increased and named Folgore.

In 1938, the Italian Libya governor Italo Balbo enlarged the military airfield (located 33 km south of Tripoli) and created an international airport for civilians served mainly by Ala Littoria, the official Italian airline: the Aeroporto di Tripoli-Castel Benito.

The airport was connected to Rome by the "Linee Aeree Transcontinentali Italiane" (LATI), that ran a postal (and civilian service) to Africa, Asia and South America from Italy.

The new airport had direct flights to Tunis and Malta, run with Savoia-Marchetti SM-73 of "Ala Littoria".

Castel Benito airport was connected with internal airports of Libya, such as Benghazi (Benina International Airport), Ghadames (Ghadames Airport), Sabha (Sabha Air Base), and Kufra (Kufra Airport).

Another flight served by "Ala Littoria" was towards the Africa Orientale Italiana, with more than 4000 km: it was used mainly for military transport and mail service and was created in 1935, from Tripoli to Kassala (Sudan) and Asmara in Italian Eritrea. It was served by the Caproni Ca.308 Borea, with capacity for a crew of 2 but with only 6 passengers.

In 1938 Air France started a regular flight from Marseille to Tripoli, later enlarged to Benghazi and Damascus.

In 1938 the Ala Littoria's international flights from the new civilian airport were:

- Rome - Malta - Tripoli
- Rome - Tunisi - Tripoli
- Rome - Tripoli - Benghazi

In spring 1939 was started a flight to Eritrea, Ethiopia and Somalia: Rome - Tripoli (Benghazi)- Cairo - Khartoum - Asmara - Addis Ababa - Mogadishu (nearly 7000 km)

In 1939 Ala Littoria started a passenger service with international travels to Rome (Italy) and Addis Ababa (Ethiopia and Africa Orientale Italiana): it was one of the first intercontinental flights in world history and was called Linea dell'Impero. The service was done (using mainly the Benghazi airport, but even the Tripoli-Castel Benito airport) with Savoia-Marchetti SM-83 carrying nearly 30 passengers.

In the summer of 1939 the possibility of direct flights between Libya and Eritrea, bypassing Egypt and Sudan controlled by the British Empire, was tested. The son of Mussolini, Bruno, an experienced aviator, was able to make a direct flight from Castel Benito airport to Kufra airport (near the desert border Libya-Sudan) and to Asmara in Italian Eritrea: this new route was used by military airplanes after WWII started.

In 1939, more and more attracted by the idea of establishing a similar regular service between Italy and Italian East Africa, Bruno Mussolini (in the meantime appointed general manager of LATI) and his staff carried out a long technical cruise with their SM83-ATTE to Tripoli and the Kufra Oasis (Libya), Asmara, Massaua, Gura and Agordat (Eritrea). The voyage gave flight experience necessary for future war missions.

The airport was used even as a military base, where some Savoia-Marchetti SM-74 operated successfully even as civilian transport airplanes. The last of these airplanes, nicknamed "Millepiedi", did the last flight to Italy from Tripoli-Castel Benito airport on January 7, 1943 before the arrival of the British Army (that fully destroyed the airport and conquered Tripoli on January 23).

During WWII the airport was attacked continuously by Allied bombers and suffered huge damage. The most destructive raids were on November/December 1941 and in December 1942/January 1943.

=== RAF Castel Benito ===
The Castel Benito airport was in activity and used by the Italians from early 1930s until 1943.

After the airport was captured by the British in January 1943, the airfield was renamed RAF Castel Benito and was used by a number of Allied operational squadrons involved in the desert war and in the Tunisia battles.

== See also ==
- Tripoli International Airport
- Linea dell'Impero

== Bibliography ==
- Abate, Rosario. Dal Borea ai Libeccio (Ca.308-Ca.318). Edizioni dell'Ateneo & Bizzarri. Milano, 1978
- Ferrari, Paolo. L'aeronautica italiana. Una storia del Novecento. Franco Angeli Storia ed. Milano, 2005 ISBN 88-464-5109-0.
- Maravigna, Pietro. Come abbiamo perduto la guerra in Africa. Editoriale Tosi. Roma, 1949.
- Rosselli, Alberto. The air links between Italy and Eastern Africa.June 1940-November 1941 Nuova Aurora Edizioni. Firenze, 2012
- Thompson, Jonathan W. (1963). Italian Civil and Military aircraft 1930-1945 Aero Publishers Inc. New York, 1963 ISBN 0-8168-6500-0.
