= Alfredo Serranti =

Italian army officer (1896–1941)

- Born: 25 May 1896; Rome, Kingdom of Italy
- Died: 21 November 1941 (aged 45); Culqualber Pass, Ethiopia
- Military career
- Allegiance: Kingdom of Italy
- Branch: Royal Italian Army
- Service years: 1915–1941
- Rank: Major
- Commands: 1st Mobilized Carabinieri Group
- Conflicts: World War I; Battles of the Isonzo; Second Battle of the Piave River; Pacification of Libya; Second Italo-Ethiopian War; Battle of the Ogaden; World War II; Battle of Culqualber
- Awards: Gold Medal of Military Valor (posthumous); Bronze Medal of Military Valor (three times)

Alfredo Serranti (25 May 1896 in Rome – 21 November 1941 in Culqualber Pass) was an officer in the Royal Italian Army during World War II. He was killed in action during the battle of Culqualber and posthumously awarded the Gold Medal of Military Valor.

== Biography ==
He was born in Rome on May 25, 1896, the son of Angelo Serranti and Celeste Boni, and after graduating as an accountant at the local "Leonardo da Vinci" Technical Institute, in 1915 he enlisted as a volunteer in the Royal Italian Army, as an artillery officer. He fought during the First World War with the 26th Field Artillery Regiment, distinguishing himself on Monte Sabotino in September 1917 and on Montello in June 1918, actions for which he was awarded two bronze medals for military valor. By the end of the war he had been promoted to lieutenant.

In 1920, at his request, he was transferred to the Carabinieri corps, assigned to the Legion of Bologna. In 1924 he was again transferred to the Royal Colonial Corps of Tripolitania, being promoted to captain in 1931, after which he returned to Italy, initially serving in the Carabinieri Legion of Rome and then in that of Palermo, where he remained until 1936. At the outbreak of the war with Ethiopia he was transferred to Somalia and assigned to the Carabinieri truck-mounted bands, distinguishing himself in the battle of Gunu Gadu (Ogaden) in April 1936, where he was decorated with his third bronze medal for military valor for the courage shown in the fighting. He was promoted to major in 1938 and stationed in Ethiopia, and upon Italy's entry into World War II, on 10 June 1940, he assumed command of the Carabinieri Group of Gondar, later renamed 1st Mobilized Carabinieri Group, consisting of seven officers, 219 Italian non-commissioned officers and Carabinieri, and 180 native Zaptié.

From 6 August 1941 his group was assigned, by order of General Guglielmo Nasi, to the defense of the stronghold of Culqualber Pass, whose fall would have resulted in the fall of Gondar. The situation in Culqualber had become critical due to the shortage of food, water and weapons and means, caused by the Anglo-Ethiopian siege. In the middle of October British attacks on Culqualber intensified, involving the sectors defended by the Carabinieri Group. The Carabinieri carried out several sorties against the positions held by the British, capturing weapons and food necessary for their survival; on 18 October Serranti personally led a raid on an Allied encampment at Amba Mariam, overrunning the camp with a surprise bayonet charge and then withdrawing with captured equipment and supplies. On November 13, the carabinieri repelled a heavy attack by Ethiopian irregulars. The final Anglo-Ethiopian attack started at 03:00 on 21 November, with the support of tanks, artillery and aircraft; Major Serranti participated in the fighting on the frontline and led a counterattack attempt until he was killed by a bayonet blow to the abdomen. Culqualber fell in the afternoon. Serranti was posthumously awarded the Gold Medal of Military Valor.
