= Royal Corps of Somali Colonial Troops =

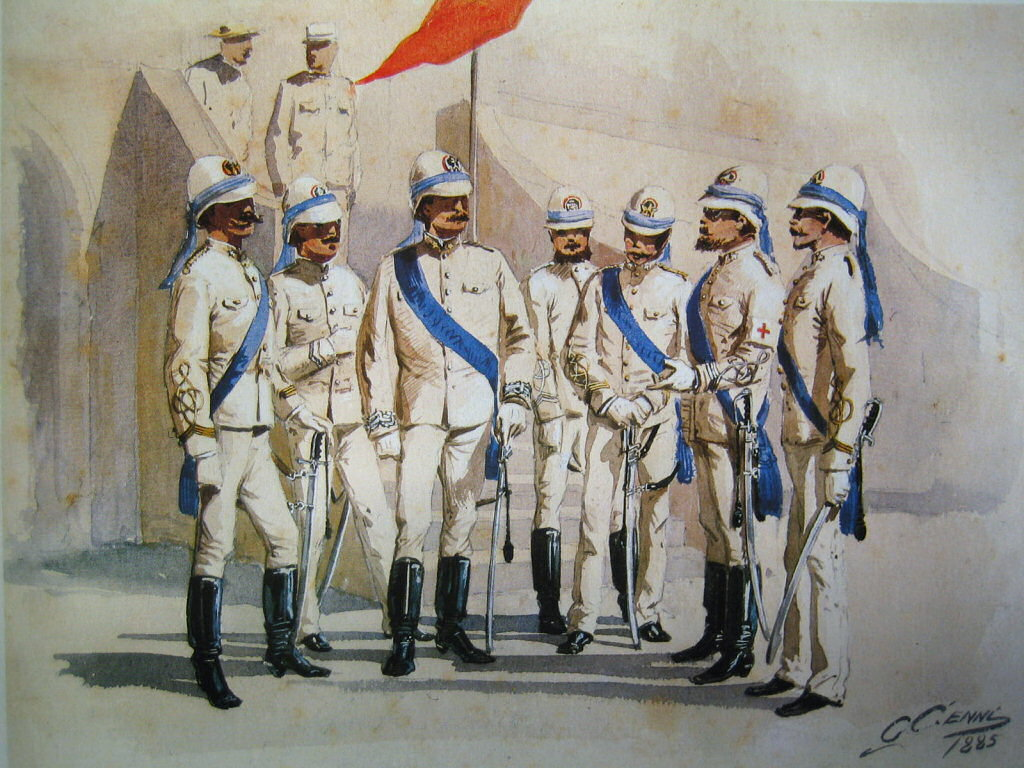
- Italian soldiers in Africa.
- Active: 5 April 1908 – 5 May 1936
- Country: Italian Somaliland
- Allegiance: Kingdom of Italy
- Branch: Royal Corps of Colonial Troops
- Type: Royal Army
- Headquarters: Mogadishu
- Engagements: Somaliland Campaign; Italo-Turkish War; Second Italo-Senussi War; Second Italo-Ethiopian War; Italian conquest of British Somaliland; East African Campaign; North African campaign
- Decorations: 1 Gold Medal of Military Valour

The Royal Corps of Somali Colonial Troops (Italian: Regio corpo truppe coloniali della Somalia italiana) was the colonial body of the Royal Italian Army based in Italian Somaliland, in present-day northeastern, central and southern Somalia.

== History ==
=== Establishment ===
In the late 19th century, Mogadishu was under the joint control of the Somali Geledi Sultanate (which, also holding sway over the Shebelle region in the interior, was at the height of its power), Hiraab Imamate and the Omani Sultan of Zanzibar. Mogadishu was thereafter made the capital of the newly established Italian Somaliland colony.

On 5 April 1908, the Royal Corps of Somali Colonial Troops was established, after the Italians had captured the southern Benadir region from the Sultan of Zanzibar. The troops were originally referred to as "Guard Corps of Benadir" (Italian: Corpo della Guardia di Benadir). However, after the territory was renamed from Benadir Coast Italian Protectorate to Italian Somaliland, the troops officially became known as the Royal Corps of Somali Colonial Troops.

In 1908, the Royal Corps assumed the final name Regio corpo truppe coloniali della Somalia italiana. This included a command, a department of Zaptie, 5 local companies, and a company of local cannon-gunners.

In 1907, the rebels Bimal lost again at Dongab and Danane, defeated by 500 Somali troops and Eritrean Ascari under Captain Vitali. The forces were supported by the Royal ship N "Relay". Between 11 and 12 July 1908, troops led by major Antonino Di Giorgio conquereded the city of Merca, after clashing with rebels in Merére and occupying Afgooye. Following a series of Italian victories, the Sultan of Geledi and his 5,000 strong army were subdued.

=== Somaliland Campaign ===
The British became convinced of their need of Italian assistance in their campaign against the Dervish forces of Diiriye Guure. However, memories of the disastrous Battle of Adowa inhibited any Italian fervour for action in the Horn region. In 1903, the Italian Foreign Ministry permitted the British to land forces at Hobyo (Obbia). An Italian naval commander off Hobyo feared "that the expedition will end in a fiasco; the Mad Mullah will become a myth for the British, who will never come across him, and a serious worry for ... our sphere of influence."

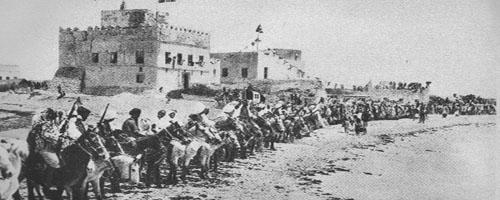
The Sultanate of Hobyo's cavalry and fort.

The relationship between the Sultanate of Hobyo and Italy soured when Sultan Yusuf Ali Kenadid refused the Italians' proposal to allow British troops to disembark in his Sultanate so that they might then pursue their battle against Diiriye Guure's Dervish forces. Viewed as too much of a threat by the Italians, Kenadid was exiled first to the British-controlled Aden Protectorate, and then to Italian Eritrea, as was his son Ali Yusuf, the heir apparent to his throne. In May, the British Foreign Office realised the error, and had Kenadid's son appointed regent, just in time to forestall an attack in Mudug by the Sultan's army.

The expedition ended in failure soon after; Diiriye Guure forces defeated a British detachment near Gumburru and then another near Daratoleh. With 1,200–1,500 rifles, 4,000 ponies and some spearmen, he occupied the Nugal Valley from Halin in the British protectorate to Ilig (or Illig) on the Italian-held coast. The main British force near Galad (Galadi) under General William Manning retreated north along the line Bohotleh–Burao–Sheekh. This "old-established line" had already been breached by Guure when he invaded the Nugal. By the end of June, the withdrawal was complete.

In 1925, the Dubats were established. These irregular Somali troops initially served under major Camillo Bechis as guerrilla forces of the Royal Corps, sometimes using camels. The troops mainly operated in the Ogaden region.

=== Second Italo-Ethiopian War and Italian East Africa ===
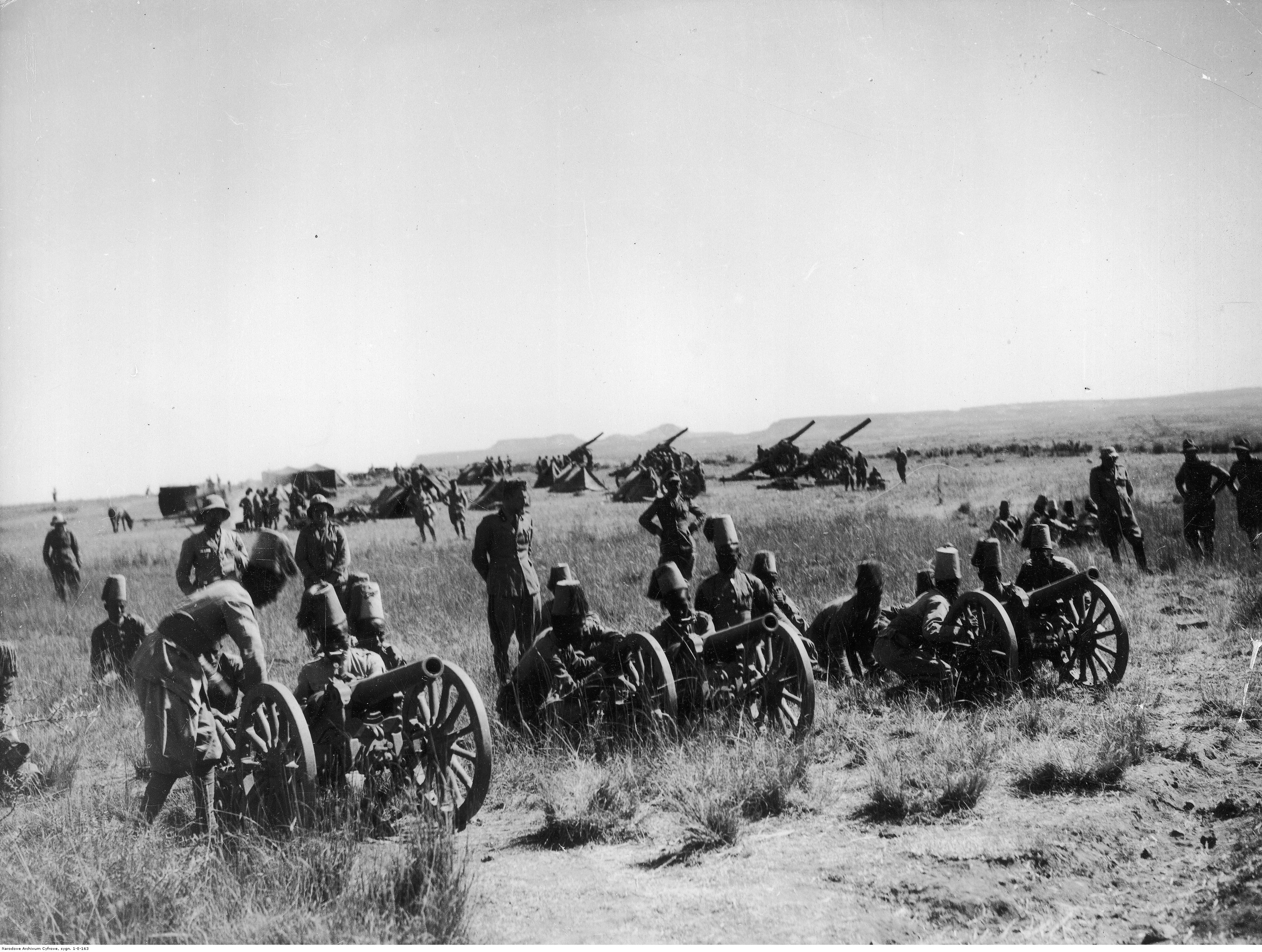
Italian artillery operated from Somali "Ascari" troops in 1936

During the Second Italo-Ethiopian War, the Somali Colonial Troops served alongside soldiers from Italy and Eritrea in a second attempt by Italian troops to defeat the Ethiopian forces.

In the Battle of the Ogaden, commanded by General Luigi Frusci who was to move forward to the pivotal point of the "Hindenburg Wall" of Ethiopian defenses under Wehib Pasha (a military advisor to the Ethiopian army), the Royal Corps of Somali Colonial troops in April 1936 fought bravely defeating the Ethiopian troops. They received an Italian "Military Gold Medal" award mainly for this victory.

On 5 May 1936, Italian troops captured Addis Ababa after defeating Ethiopia during the Second Italo-Abyssinian War. Benito Mussolini then proclaimed the establishment of Italian East Africa, which unified Italian Eritrea and Italian Somaliland with defeated Ethiopia. Addis Ababa was later made the capital city of Italian East Africa.

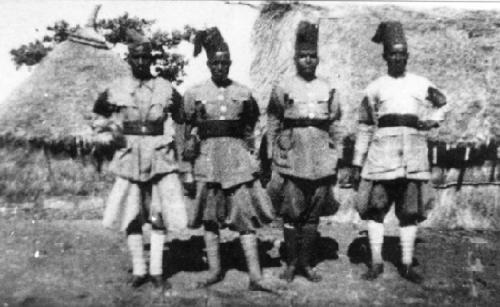
Group of Zaptié in Italian Somaliland (1939).

The Somali Colonial Troops would then be merged with other Royal troops, creating even the Italian African Police and the Somali "Carabinieri" (Zaptie).

In 1940, the Somali Colonial Troops were officially added to the Italian Army, establishing the Italian Somali Divisions (101 and 102).

After World War II, a former member of the Zaptìé corps, Siad Barre, became President of Somalia from 1969 to 1991.

== Honors ==
Gold Medal of Military Valor - Awarded for heroism during the Italo-Ethiopian War of October 3, 1935 to May 5, 1936.

== See also ==
- Italian Empire
- Italian Armed Forces
- Italian Somaliland
- Italian Somali Divisions (101 and 102)
- Dubats
- Zaptie
