= Carlo Garbieri (army officer) =

Italian Army officer and football referee

- Born: 26 December 1895; Genoa, Kingdom of Italy
- Died: 21 November 1941 (aged 45); Culqualber Pass, Ethiopia
- Military career
- Allegiance: Kingdom of Italy
- Branch: Royal Italian Army
- Rank: Major
- Commands: LVXII Colonial Battalion
- Conflicts: World War I; Battles of the Isonzo; Battle of Asiago; Second Italo-Ethiopian War; World War II; East African campaign; Battle of Culqualber
- Awards: Gold Medal of Military Valor (posthumous); Silver Medal of Military Valor (three times); War Cross for Military Valor (twice); War Merit Cross

Carlo Garbieri (Genoa, 26 December 1895 – Culqualber Pass, 21 November 1941) was an Italian Army officer and football referee. He was killed in action during the battle of Culqualber and posthumously awarded the Gold Medal of Military Valor.

== Biography ==
He was born in Genoa on December 26, 1895, the son of Giovanni Garbieri and Nilde Carfagni, and after graduating in physics and mathematics at the University of Genoa he enlisted in the Royal Italian Army in November 1915, during the First World War, with the rank of second lieutenant assigned to the 152nd Regiment of the "Sassari" Infantry Brigade. He fought on the Karst and later o the Asiago plateau, where he was seriously wounded in June 1916 during the battle of Asiago; he later became the commander of the Arditi unit of the brigade, and by the end of the war he had been awarded two Silver Medals for Military Valor and the War Merit Cross; he was discharged with the rank of lieutenant in 1919, and started working as a teacher.

Passionate about football, he was one of the founding members of Spes Football Club of Genoa, and in 1919 he started a career as a referee. From 1926 he refereed in the National Division, where he conducted 27 football matches, and in 1929 he moved to the newly formed Serie A, in which he made his debut on 6 October directing the match between Triestina and Torino. He refereed for two seasons, directing eighteen matches, the last of which took place on June 14, 1931, between Napoli and Casale. He also served as president of the Referees Group of Genoa.

Having been promoted to captain in the Army reserve in 1927, in December 1935 Garbieri enlisted in the 6th CC.NN. Division "Tevere" during the Second Italo-Ethiopian War, fighting on the Somali front and earning a War Cross for Military Valor. After the end of the war, Garbieri briefly returned to Italy, but soon abandoned teaching at the university and went back to Italian East Africa as manager of an important trading company.

With Italy's entry into the Second World War on 10 June 1940, he was called back into service, initially assigned to the staff of the 1st Blackshirt Legion of Addis Ababa, and then to that of the CLXVI Blackshirt Battalion, earning another Silver Medal and another War Cross for Military Valor. On 1 July 1941, after promotion to major, he assumed command of the LVXII Colonial Battalion, stationed near Gondar. He was killed during the battle of Culqualber, by a rifle shot in the heart during hand-to-hand combat when his outpost was overrun, and was posthumously awarded the Gold Medal of Military Valor.
