= Augusto Ugolini =

- Born: 7 December 1887; Padua, Kingdom of Italy
- Died: March 1977 (aged 89); Rome, Italy
- Military career
- Allegiance: Kingdom of Italy; Italy
- Branch: Royal Italian Army; Italian Army
- Service years: 1909–1945
- Rank: Lieutenant General
- Commands: 11th Eritrean Battalion; Gruppo Bande del Goggiam
- Conflicts: Italo-Turkish War; First Italo-Senussi War; World War I; Pacification of Libya; Second Italo-Ethiopian War; Italian occupation of Ethiopia; World War II; East African campaign; Northern Front; Battle of Culqualber
- Awards: Gold Medal of Military Valor; Silver Medal of Military Valor (twice); Bronze Medal of Military Valor (twice); Military Order of Italy; Order of the Crown of Italy

Augusto Ugolini (6 December 1887 in Padua – March 1977 in Rome) was an officer in the Royal Italian Army during World War II, best known for his leadership during the battle of Culqualber, for which he was awarded the Gold Medal of Military Valor.

== Biography ==
He was born in Padua on December 6, 1887, the son of Ugolino Ugolini and Elisabetta Revere. After attending middle school in Brescia, he moved to Turin, where he graduated in economics and business. In January 1908 he enlisted in the Royal Italian Army to perform his mandatory military service as cadet officer, and in April of the following year he became second lieutenant of the administrative corps. In July 1912 he was recalled into active service and transferred to Libya during the Italo-Turkish War, assigned to the 63rd Infantry Regiment operating in the Bengasi area. After being promoted to lieutenant in November 1915, he was repatriated at his request to fight on the Italian front during World War I. Having learned that his brother Bruno, serving in the 77th Infantry Regiment of the "Toscana" Brigade, had been killed in action near San Giovanni di Duino, he asked to be transferred to this unit. He attended an infantry officer's course at the Royal Military Academy of Modena and was then assigned to 77th Infantry Regiment, participating in war operations.

After the end of the war, in 1919 he returned to Libya, initially with the 1st Colonial Regiment, and then with the 265th Infantry Regiment, participating in the early stages of the pacification of Libya. In November of the same year, after carrying out a mission in the Eastern Mediterranean, he returned to Italy, where he emerged as a writer of military issues and collaborator of the Rivista di Fanteria (Infantry Magazine). During the 1930s he was promoted to major, and after having attended the colonial studies course and the related mandatory period as battalion commander, as the outbreak of war with Ethiopia appeared imminent, in 1935 he asked to be transferred to Eritrea. He participated in war operations at the head of the 11th Eritrean Battalion, earning a Bronze Medal of Military Valor, and at the end of the war he participated in counterguerrilla operations for the "pacification" of the newly established Empire, being promoted to lieutenant colonel, placed in command of the Gruppo Bande del Goggiam (Gojjam Bands Group, later re-organized as a colonial brigade), and receiving two silver medals for military valor.

After the entry of the Kingdom of Italy into the World War II, on 10 June 1940, he participated in the East African campaign with the rank of colonel, fighting on the northern front (near the border with Sudan) and receiving another bronze medal of military valor in February 1941; after the British offensive in early 1941 and the subsequent Italian retreat towards the Amhara region, Ugolini was tasked with establishing a defensive line in the mountainous region between Lake Tana and the Denghel massif. At his disposal he had his colonial brigade, the 1st Mobilized Carabinieri Battalion, two Blackshirt battalions (67th and 240th), the 67th Colonial Battalion, and three artillery batteries. The key position of this defensive system was Culqualber Pass, held by some 3,000 troops under Ugolini's direct command; from May to October 1941, the Culqualber garrison was besieged by superior Commonwealth and Arbegnoch forces, repelling several assaults, and Ugolini was mentioned in the Italian war bulletin three times. The final Allied attack by some 22,500 Commonwealth troops and Ethiopian irregulars supported by tanks and a heavy artillery barrage took place in November 1941, leading to the fall of Culqualber on 21 November. Ugolini, who had been wounded by shrapnel, was captured during hand-to-hand combat when his command post was surrounded and stormed, having refused to surrender his gun; a South African officer saved him just as a Sudanese soldier was about to deliver a killing blow. For his defense of Culqualber he was awarded the Gold Medal of Military Valor, Italy's highest military award; he spent the rest of the war in British captivity, returning to Italy in November 1945.

He was transferred to the Army reserve in 1948, being promoted to brigadier general in 1950, to major general in 1950 and later to lieutenant general. He then became national president of the National Federation of Refugee and Italian Veterans of Africa (FeNCPIA). He settled in Rome, where he died in March 1977, aged 89.
