= Italian Somali Divisions (101 and 102) =

Italian division in World War II

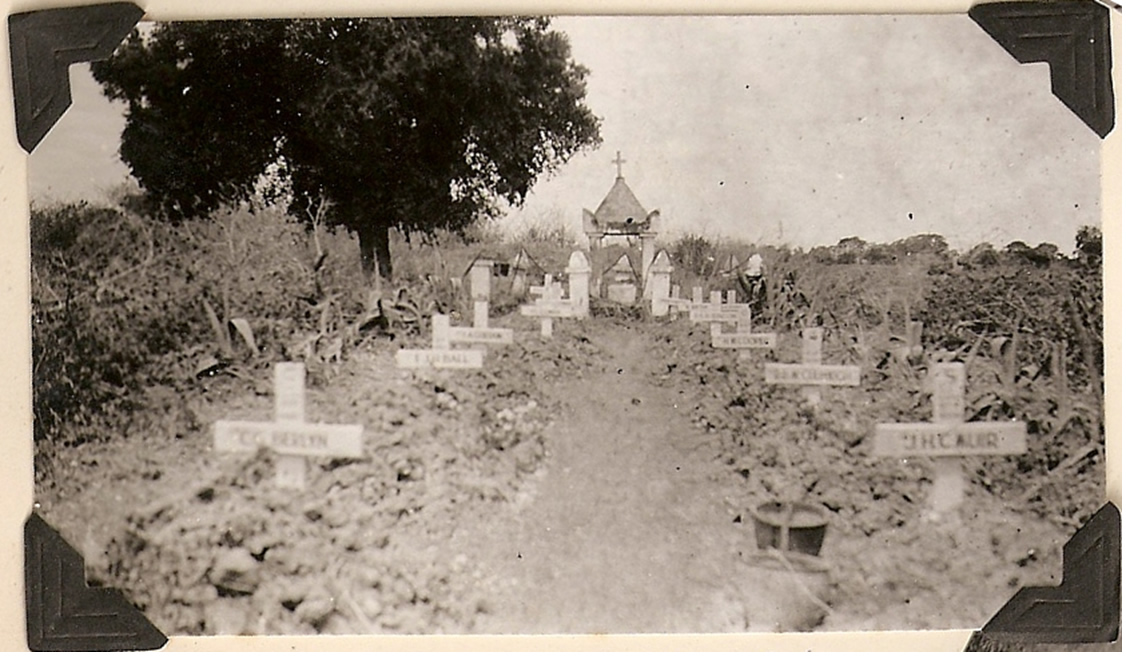
Juba Cemetery's photo of British carbineers: at Gelib on the Juba river was fought a harsh battle between the Italian Somali Divisions and the British Army

The Italian Somali Divisions were two divisions of colonial soldiers from Italian Somaliland that were formed as part of the Regio Esercito (Italian Army) Royal Corps of Colonial Troops during the Second World War. In the Royal Corps of Colonial Troops, the units comprised the 101ª Divisione coloniale somala and 102ª Divisione coloniale somala and fought during the East African Campaign in 1941 before disbanding.

== History ==
After June 1940, when the Kingdom of Italy declared war on the Allies, two divisions of Somali soldiers were raised in Italian Somaliland. These were called the "101 Divisione Somala" and the "102 Divisione Somala". The divisions' initial personnel were drawn mainly from some of the colonial brigades that had fought in the conquest of Ethiopia in 1936 and British Somalia in 1940.

But soon after their formation, new recruits were enlisted in order to meet the numbers required for a standard Italian division (around 7,000 soldiers). These recruits received training by Italian NCOs, although this was interrupted in the early stages of the war by the construction of a small new decauville railway between Villabruzzi and the Ethiopian frontier. As a result, at the start of World War II there were 20,458 Somali soldiers in Italian Somaliland, mostly in these two new divisions, but they were not well trained for combat.

At the end of 1940, the 1st Somali Division, commanded by General Carnevali, was sent to defend the Juba river in western Italian Somaliland, in response to Italian concerns of a British attack from British Kenya. The 2nd Somali Division, commanded by General Santini, remained initially in the area of Mogadishu as a possible reserve force, before moving to the Gelib area in February 1941.

The 101st Colonial Division under Brigadier-General Italo Carnevali held the much longer Dugiuma-Dolo sector, and the bulk of his infantry (the 73rd, 74th and 76th Colonial Battalions) was initially concentrated round Bardera, with the 191st Colonial Battalion near Lugh Ferrandi and the 192nd in the Dolo area.

In the first days of February 1941 the British attacked the Juba front and after heavy fighting the 101 Divisione Somala, although reinforced by some units of the 102 Divisione Somala, was half destroyed. General Carlo De Simone, commander-in-chief of all Italian forces in Italian Somaliland, ordered the division’s retreat toward Ethiopia. General Baccari subsequently replaced Carnevali, after the latter was wounded in combat and became sick.

The 101st Colonial Division, originally ordered to fall back on Callafo, south of Gabredarre, had been given fresh radio instructions by the “Comando Superiore”, rerouting their columns to Neghelli. The rest of General De Simone’s forces were ordered to fall back on Harar. General Baccari’s command, with bombing demoralizing the Native troops, was in a state of dissolution. By the time they reached Dolo, 101st Colonial Divisional Headquarters, with three batteries of 77 mm guns and three of 65 mm, had lost all their Native personnel.

While in southern Ethiopia, the division was practically dismantled on March 7, when the few surviving brigades reached Harar in central Ethiopia. Successively some of the 101 Somali Division's Italian officers fought in the reduct of Gondar until November 1941.

The "102 Divisione Somala", consisting mainly of new recruits who were not well trained for combat, retreated to Ethiopia after the British crossed the Juba river, following heavy clashes.

Haifa battalion of 102 Colonial Infantry from Jumbo began to advance under their white Italian officers at about 5:45 a.m. on 18 February. In the pre-dawn darkness they moved silently and unseen almost up to the Transvaal Scottish line, before the glimmer of daybreak revealed to the waiting South Africans scores of crouching figures clearly silhouetted against the glow of the eastern sky.'B' Company of the Transvaal Scottish opened fire almost as one man. Rifle and machine-gun bullets ripped into the advancing ranks and mowed them down. With great gallantry the enemy came on again and again in the face of withering fire. Italian officers, with admirable courage, rallied their men and themselves mounted machine-guns on the open plain without cover of any sort to add their fire to the unequal contest against the Bren-and Vickers-gunners in the Transvaal Scottish bridgehead....it was said by the defenders of the (British) bridgehead that of the attacking force of half a battalion not one returned to Jumbo.

The soldiers of this colonial division fought hard around Gelib, rolling up the Juba river but were forced to retreat by the better-equipped British force. The division was dismantled in the Ogaden area. Some of its soldiers – mainly the Italian officers – retreated to "Passo Marda" south of Addis Ababa where they made a last stand.

== Organization ==
=== 101st Somali Division ===
- 101st Somali Division, in Jilib – Brigadier-General Italo Carnevali
  - XX Colonial Brigade, in Baidoa – Colonel Giuseppe Azzolini
    - XL Colonial Battalion
    - LXXIV Colonial Battalion
    - LXXV Colonial Battalion
    - LXXVI Colonial Battalion
    - XX Colonial Artillery Group (65/17 mod. 13 mountain guns)
    - 20th Colonial Cavalry Squadron
    - 20th Mixed Colonial Engineer Company
    - 20th Colonial Field Hospital
    - 20th Colonial Supply Column
  - XCI Colonial Brigade, in Jilib – Colonel Alfredo Baccari
    - LXXV Colonial Battalion
    - CXCIV Colonial Battalion
    - CXCVI Colonial Battalion
    - XCI Colonial Artillery Group (70/15 mod. 02 field guns)
    - 91st Colonial Cavalry Squadron
    - 91st Mixed Colonial Engineer Company
    - 91st Colonial Field Hospital
    - 91st Colonial Supply Column

=== 102nd Somali Division ===
- 102nd Somali Division, in Barawa – Brigadier-General Santini
  - XCII Colonial Brigade, in Barawa – Colonel Giaume
    - LXXIV Colonial Battalion
    - CXCI Colonial Battalion
    - CXCII Colonial Battalion
    - XCII Colonial Artillery Group (70/15 mod. 02 field guns)
    - 92nd Colonial Cavalry Squadron
    - 92nd Mixed Colonial Engineer Company
    - 92nd Colonial Field Hospital
    - 92nd Colonial Supply Column

== See also ==
- Italian East Africa
- Regio Esercito

== Bibliography ==
- Orpen, N. (1968). East African and Abyssinian Campaigns. South African Forces, World War II. Vol. I (online scan ed.). Cape Town, SA: Purnell. OCLC 499914466 – via Hyperwar.
- Scorzelli, Lucio (2014). Giarrettiere, balilla e braghe di tela [Garters, balilla and canvas bags]. Roma: Lampi di stampa. ISBN 978-8-84-881671-7.
