= Uolchefit =

Place in Amhara Region, Ethiopia

Uolchefit is a place in Amhara Region, Ethiopia. Its time zone is Africa/Addis_Ababa (UTC). It is also written Wolchefit, Wolkefit or Wilkifit.

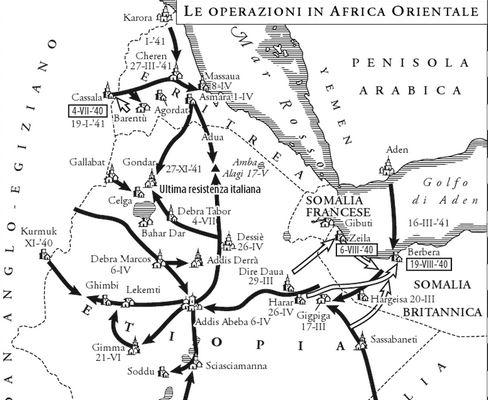
ORIENTAL AFRICA ITALIAN MILITARY OPERATIONS

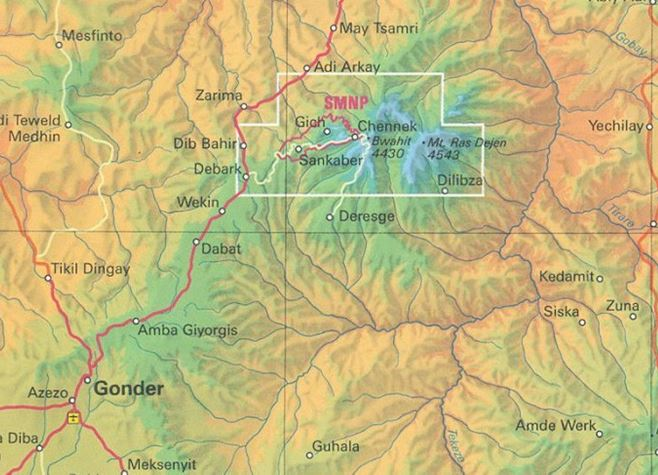
Simien Mountains Location & Gondar

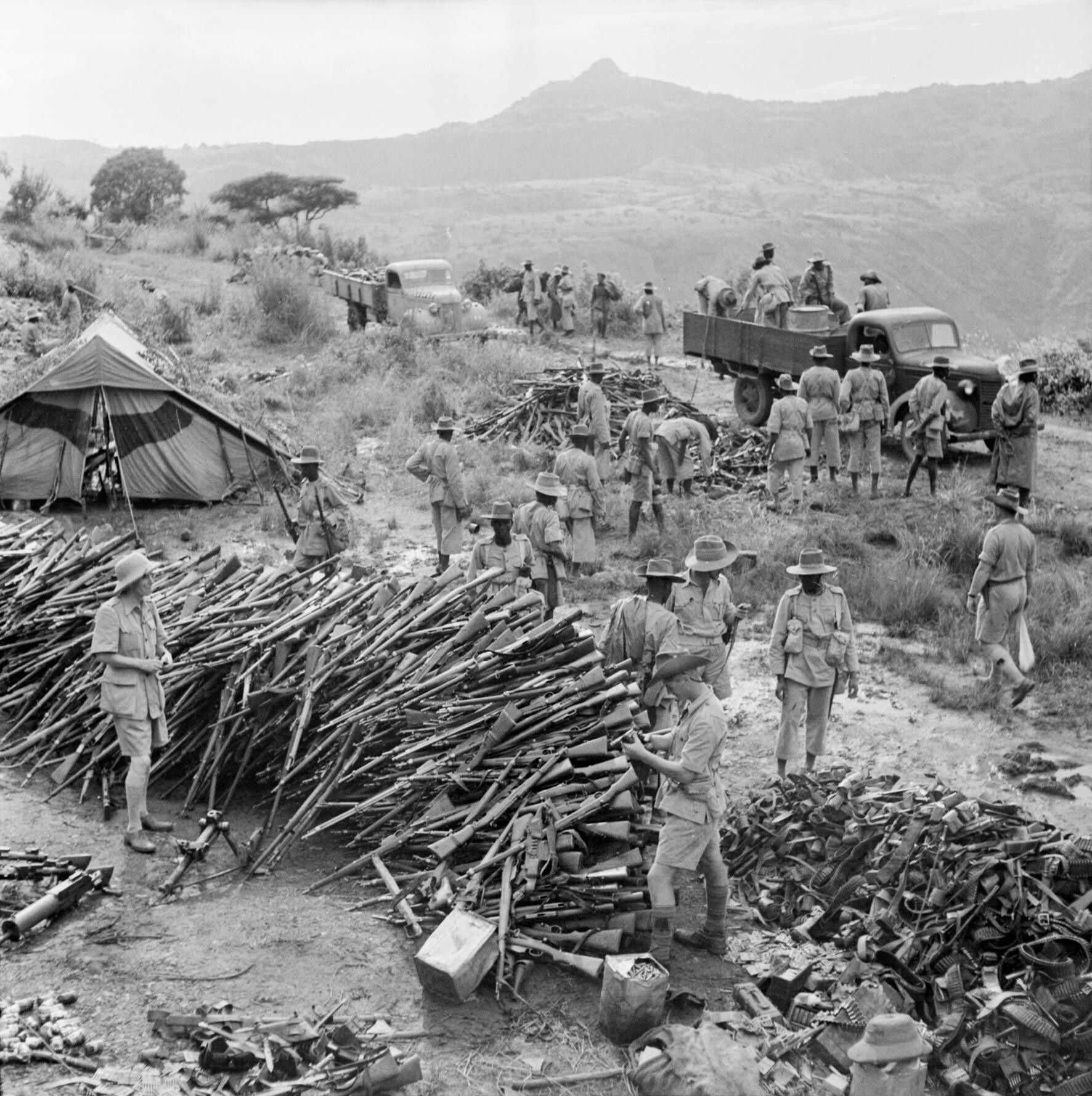
28 September 1941; men of the King's African Rifles collect weapons surrendered by Italian forces at Uolchefit Pass, Ethiopia

The distance from Uolchefit to Ethiopia's capital Addis Ababa is approximately 471 kilometres (293 miles). It is both a village and a pass (2,835 m). It was an Italian stronghold on the road to Gondar from the north, during the Italian occupation of Ethiopia.

Uolchefit closest urban location is Debarq (also spelled Dabareq and Debark, Amharic ደባርቅ) which is a town in northern Ethiopia, 90 kilometers north of Gondar on the highway between Gondar and Axum and in the Semien Gondar Zone of the Amhara Region. It has a latitude and longitude of 13°08′N 37°54′E and an elevation of 2850 meters above sea level. Debarq is the closest town to the Semien Mountains National Park, and the location of the park headquarters.

During the end stages of the East African campaign, Uolchefit was an Italian defensive position. Control of the pass was needed to launch the final attack on Gondar, and it was defended by a garrison of about 4,000 men (Colonel Mario Gonella) in localities distributed in depth for about 3 mi (4.8 km). The stronghold had been besieged by irregular Ethiopian forces, led by Major B. J. Ringrose, since May and on 5 May the Italians retreated from Amba Giorgis. The besieging force was later augmented by the arrival of the 3/14th Punjab Battalion from the Indian Army and part of the 12th African Division. Several attacks, counter-attacks and sorties were launched between May and August 1941. On 28 September 1941, after losing 950 casualties and running out of provisions, Gonella surrendered with 1,629 Italian and 1,450 Ethiopian soldiers to the 25th East African Brigade (Brigadier W. A. L. James). Work began to repair the road to Gondar during the autumn rains.

Luciano Gavazzi, gold medal for military valor and battalion commander fell at Uolchefit in 1941. Gavazzi Luciano was battalion commander of CC. NN. and deputy commander of the defense of Uolchefit (East Africa), although weakened by serious harm, gave in every difficult contingency refulgent example of pure faith, sacred enthusiasm and valuable, intelligent activity. Repeatedly invoked the honor to engage in open field against overwhelming enemy forces, and July 13, in command of a column operating in the area of national Amberco, he performed this task with great success by virtue of his great courage and sublime contempt the danger. On August 1, though suffering, assumed the command of the assault on Giramba other column, launched the bloody attack and being frustrated by mines and barbed wire of the enemies, he knew how to disengage brilliantly despite the additional dangerously threatening masses on the opposing side. Then again dragged his men to a furious counterattack, allowing them to rectify the situation. Weakened by poor health from the toils and hardships and struck by sudden, inexorable disease, then ascended to the heaven of heroes. Spirit elected as a soldier, repeatedly decorated for bravery, squad of pure faith, he was with the holy enthusiasm, the soul of the defense of that distant strip of Italian land. Uolchefit, (East Africa), from April to August 1941.
MAZZAGLIA Giuseppe, Major in s.p.e. (Artillery, R.C.T.C. Eritrea), gold medal for military valor and gunner fell at Uolchefit in 1941, during the war in East Africa. Magnificent figure of a soldier and gunner, in critical particular circumstances of war, gave example of a constant devotion to duty and continuous testing of indomitable courage and supreme valor. Artillery commander dell'Uolchefit basing indomitable passion to his command action, prepared and conducted its batteries splendid successes in violent attacks by relevant tenacious enemy forces, which besieged for several weeks reduced. During intense deadly enemy bombardment, while the observatory, dangerously exposed, repeatedly centered, with excellent action and great effectiveness, directed the counter-battery fire, fell hit by shrapnel death, sacrificing his life, heroically he lived, for Motherland. He maintained until the last moment the serene calm of the strong. beautiful example of high sense of military duty, pushed to the extreme sacrifice. Uolchefit (A.OJ.), July 4, 1941
BASTIANI Sante Angelo, Sergeant Major (Colonial Infantry, Commander irregular band 'Bastiani'), gold medal for military valor and commander fell at Uolchefit in 1941, during the war in East Africa. Commander and only National irregular band headed to his name He performed legendary deeds of value, capacity and sublime heroism, writing with shining blood glorious pages in the history of colonial departments. Staunch defender of Uolchefit took part in all the epic deeds of that glorious bastion Gondarino, addressing the head of his followers the hardest ordeals, making the most epic heroics, constantly defying death in a series of daring battles that imposed admiration enemy. Step into the action of Cinà against powerful fierce training, heedless of the danger of death that resulted from a large ransom has already been put on his head, hid the serious health conditions in which trovavasi on the grounds of serious illness and high fever, exacerbated by four injured war not yet healed and disdained hospitalization to lead once more his brave soldiers to the ordeal and to victory. Incuneatosi cleverly in the enemy camp, with legendary daring and defying risks and mortal dangers swooped by surprise, lightning and overwhelming on the opponent's command post, personally capturing the Ras commander and annihilating into raging body extended to the very strong body row that surrounded him. Silencing with indomitable strength of spirit, his severe physical condition, driving even with unstoppable momentum in subsequent bloody bayonet assaults and the mighty men, captured broad masses of prisoners, materials, weapons and ammunition and determined the collapse of the political military of enemy resistance, reconfirming its preclari virtue of intrepid soldier and brave commander. Step Cinà (A.O.), Uolchefit l' Amara, June 22, 1941.
CALENDA Enrico, Lieutenant s.p.e. (Sharpshooters, Amara bands Group), gold medal for military valor and commander fell at Uolchefit in 1941, during the war in East Africa. Band Commander adjust a garrison isolated, the head of his followers, he was elected shining example of military virtues and contempt of life, he bursts several times in the superior enemy formations in number and means, travolgendole and dispersing them with impetuosity impetuous warrior. In hard fighting lasted for several hours, overcame the difficulties and resistance from strong rebellious masses, breaking in assaults decided the defense of well-armed positions and contributing, in competition with another department, the capture of a Ras and large haul of weapons, ammunition and materials. Partly under the rage of massive terrestrial aerial bombardments, unstoppable under the most dangerous threats, regardless of the risk, bold, fearless, dragging his successful band in successful wherever repelling the enemy obstinacy. During a powerful indiscriminate aerial action, he fell into Holocaust apotheosis of light and glory, as the highest heroic sacrifice, of unparalleled value, of total dedication to duty and to the Fatherland. Cinà step - Uolchefit l' Amara (A.O.), June 22–25 August 1941.

== Bibliography ==
- Rassegna sociale dell'Africa italiana, Volume 4, Issues 8-12 - Istituto fascista perl'assistenza sociale nell'Africa italiana, Fondo assistenza malattie nell'Africa italiana - 1941
- Sergio Romano, Mario Cervi, Indro Montanelli, L'Italia della disfatta - 10 giugno 1940 - 8 settembre 1943: La storia d'Italia #14 - Bur - History - 416 pages
- Playfair, Major-General I. S. O.; et al. (1954). Butler, J. R. M. (ed.). The Mediterranean and Middle East: The Early Successes Against Italy (to May 1941). History of the Second World War, United Kingdom Military Series. Vol. I. HMSO. OCLC 494123451.
