= Ascari del Cielo =

Paratroopers of the Italian armed forces

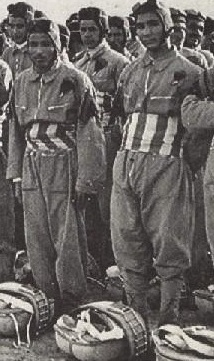
Ascari del Cielo Paratroopers

The Ascari del Cielo were the first paratroopers of the Italian Armed Forces. They all were born in Libya and with Arab-Berber ethnicity. They constituted the majority of the troops of the Battalion (later regiment) "Fanti dell'Aria", created in 1938, that fought in the Desert War during World War II.

== History ==
In spring 1938 the royal colonial troops in Libya created two battalions of Ascari paratroopers, who, together with a battalion of Italian paratroopers, formed shortly after the 1st Paratroopers Regiment "Fanti dell'Aria". The word "ascari" indicated that they were colonial (and not Italian) troops.

On March 22, 1938, the Paratroopers Battalion was formed. The battalion consisted of about 300 native Libyans and thirty Italian officers and NCOs. They were under the command of Lieutenant Colonel Goffredo Tonini and stationed at the airport of Castel Benito near Tripoli.

After four weeks of training was launched simultaneously the entire battalion outside "Castel Benito airport" with the use of 24 three-engined Savoia-Marchetti SM.81, belonging to the 15º Stormo of the Italian Air Force. Another launch was done a few days later and carried out at night.

Some casualties happened, like with Ugasci Mohamed Ben Ali who was the first paratrooper to die (twenty paratroopers died in exercise launches before World War II). They were noticed and appreciated even by Hermann Göring, when paraded in front of him in 1939.

In the summer of 1940 the Ascari del Cielo were nicknamed "Diavoli neri" (Black devils) and numbered 500. In September, during the Italian invasion of Egypt, the 1st Paratroopers Regiment "Fanti dell'Aria" assaulted the positions of the Coldstream Guards in Sollum and forced them to withdraw.

In January 1941, with the beginning of the British counter-offensive, the Ascari del Cielo were renamed Gruppo Mobile Tonini.

During the first part of Jan. 1941 the battalion was moved to Derna and absorbed the remnants of the Gruppo Pancano and static units assigned to El Fteiah which totalled 370 men, 3 47/32mm guns, 4 75/27 guns, 12 20mm guns, 4 M11/39 tanks, 1 captured Humber armored car, 22 trucks and 12 motorcycles. The Libyan Battalion amounted to 430 at the time and an additional 50 men from the Parachute School. So, the total force comprised with the new units was 850 men strong and combining the weapons it brought the numbers to: 8 47/32mm guns, 8 Fiat M35 machineguns, 30 Breda M30 LMGs, and 12 20mm guns. This new comprised force was renamed Gruppo Mobile Tonini.

By February 1941 they nearly cease to exist as an effective combat force after the British offensive during Operation Compass. In December 1942, the last of these paratroopers were captured in the advance of Montgomery in Libya after the battle of El Alamein.

== Bibliography ==
- Girlando Raffaele. I paracadutisti libici. Immagini e commenti storici Editrice New Italia. Roma, 2006 ISBN 9788895038032

== See also ==
- Italian Libya
- Operation Compass
- Askari
