= Battle of Gondar =

Battle in WWII

- Part of the East African campaign of the Second World War
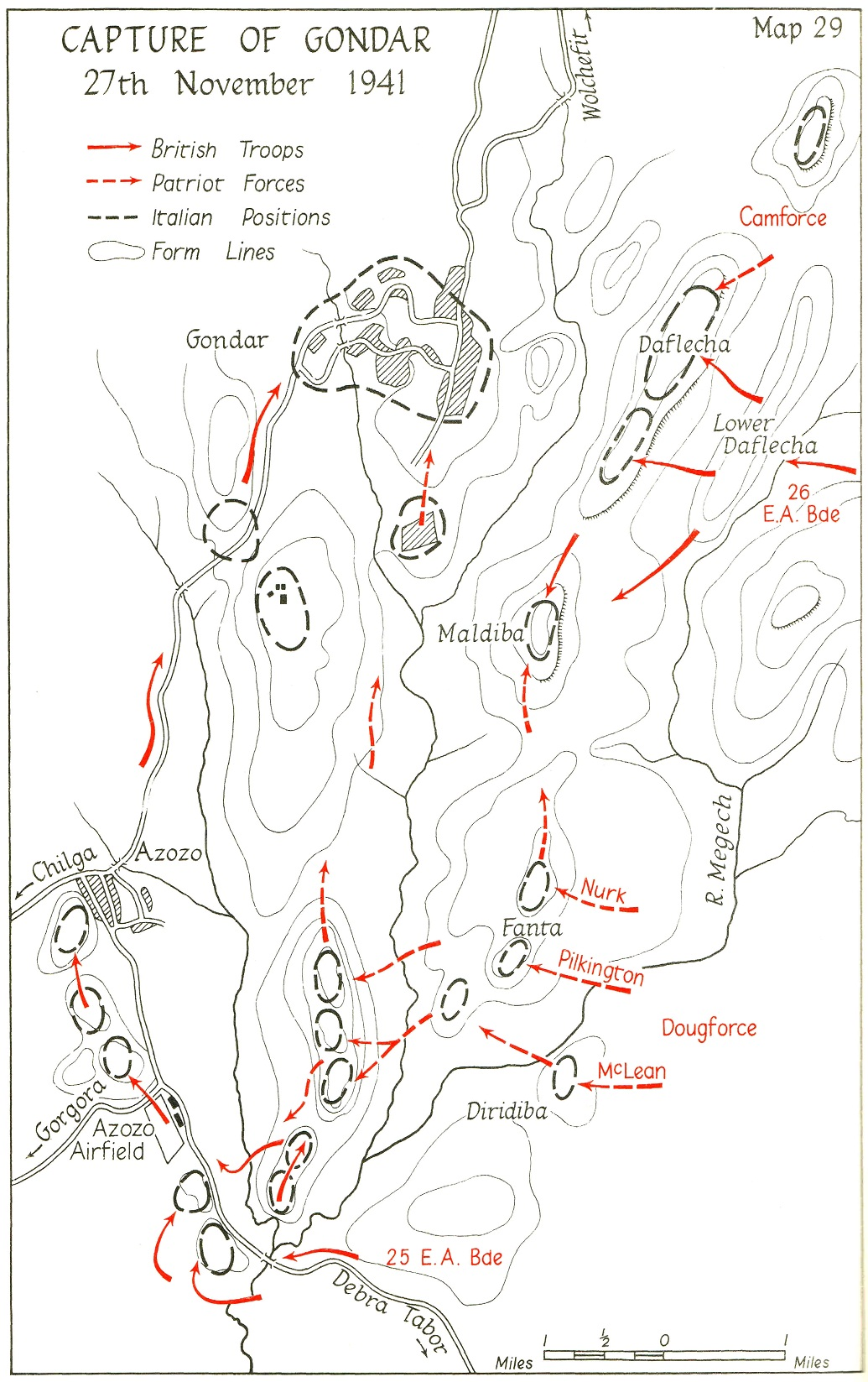
- British and Ethiopian movements against the Italians at Gondar
| Date | 13–27 November 1941 (2 weeks) |
| Location | Gondar, Amhara Governorate, Italian East Africa 12°36′00″N 37°28′00″E |
| Result | Allied victory |
| Territorial changes | Occupation of Italian East Africa |

Belligerents
| Italy: Italian East Africa | British Empire: Kenya; Gold Coast; Nigeria; South Africa; Ethiopia |

Commanders and leaders
| (Kingdom of Italy) Guglielmo Nasi (surrendered) | (United Kingdom) William Platt (United Kingdom) Charles Fowkes |

Strength
| 41,000; 70 guns 1 aircraft | 2 East African Infantry brigades Ethiopian Patriots; Kenya Armoured Car Regiment; South African Light Armoured Detachment |

Casualties and losses
| Italian: 407 killed (November 1941), 1,289 killed since June 1940; Ascari: 3,700 killed June–November 1941; Sick and wounded: 8,400 (Italian and Askari); 22,000 prisoners (Italian and Askari); 1 aircraft | Final assault: 32 killed 182 wounded 6 missing 15 aircraft |
- Gondar, city and district (woreda), in the Semien Gondar Zone of the Amhara Region, north of Tana Lake

The Battle of Gondar or Capture of Gondar was the last stand of the Italian forces in Italian East Africa during the Second World War. The battle took place in November 1941, during the East African Campaign. Gondar was the main town of Amhara in the mountains north of Lake Tana in Ethiopia, at an elevation of 7,000 ft (2,100 m) and had an Italian garrison of 40,000 men, commanded by Generale Guglielmo Nasi.

== Background ==
After the defeat of the Italians at the Battle of Keren (1 April 1941), many of the remaining Italians withdrew to the strongholds of Amba Alagi, Jimma and Gondar. Amba Alagi fell in May and Jimma fell in July. Gondar is the capital of Amhara on the high ground north of Lake Tana at 7,000 ft (2,100 m). In 1941 it was a road junction but only the Amhara road had an all-weather surface. At Wolchefit, guarded by a garrison of Italian troops, 70 mi (110 km) towards Amhara, the road chicaned up a 4,000 ft (1,200 m) escarpment, some parts having been cut into a vertical cliff. From Wolchefit to Gondar the road traced the edge of the escarpment and at Dabat, 30 mi (48 km) short of Gondar and at Amba Giorgis were small garrisons. Only a minor road from Um Hagar to the north had a junction with the main road. West from the town, a fair-weather road in poor repair, led to Gallabat and had a garrison at Chilga. There were rough tracks to the west of Lake Tana which met at Gorgora and a better road ran east to Debra Tabor, also garrisoned and Dessie. At Kulkaber, 30 mi (48 km) from Gondar, the road passed between Lake Tana and the hills; from Debra Tabor to Dessie, it was a soil road and impassable in rain.

== Prelude ==
The possession of the Wolchefit and Kulkaber mountain passes was instrumental for attacking Gondar. Wolchefit was defended by a garrison of about 4,000 men under Colonel Mario Gonella. The stronghold had been besieged by irregular Ethiopian forces, led by British Major Ringrose, since May 1941; the besieging force was later augmented by the arrival of units from the British Indian Army and part of the 12th African Division. Several attacks and counterattacks were launched between May and August 1941. On 28 September 1941, after losing in combat 950 men and running out of food, Gonella surrendered with 1,629 Italians and 1,450 colonial soldiers.

On 13 November, a mixed force from the British 12th (African) Division under Major-General Charles Fowkes—supported by Ethiopian irregular troops—attacked the key defensive position of Kulkaber and were repelled. Kulkalber was besieged since early September and had already been subjected to several attacks and bombardments. A second attack on 21 November from several directions was resisted until the afternoon, when Italian posts began to surrender. In the final attack there were 206 British and Ethiopian casualties and 2,423 Italian and Ethiopian prisoners taken (Italian sources list Italian casualties as 1,003 killed, 804 wounded and 1,900 prisoners).

By this point the Allies had total control of the skies: the Italians had one Fiat CR.42 left, piloted by Sergente Giuseppe Mottet. On 22 November, in the Regia Aeronautica's final sortie in East Africa, he made a strafing run on British artillery at Kulkaber that killed the Commander, Royal Artillery, Lieutenant-Colonel Ormsby. Afterwards, Mottet landed at Gondar, destroyed the plane and fought on with the army.

== Battle ==
=== Mountain passes ===
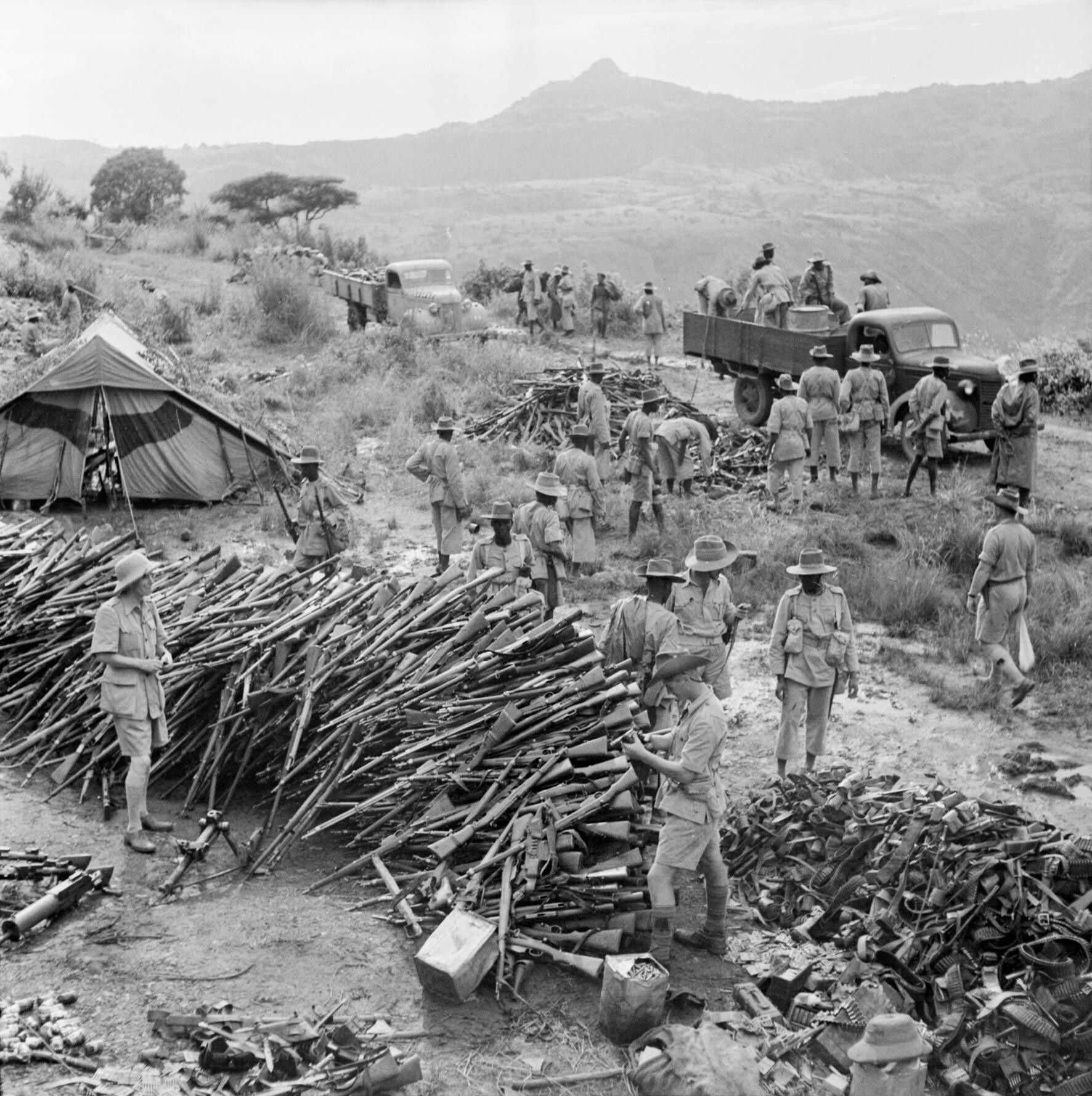
28 September 1941; men of the King's African Rifles collect weapons surrendered by Italian forces at Uolchefit Pass

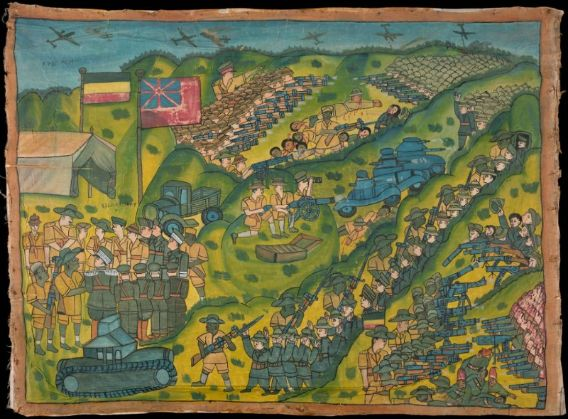
Ethiopian painting of the battle

There were two mountain passes that overlooked the town which were controlled by the Italian troops. They were invested by the two brigades of the 12th (African) Division. The two Italian groups in the passes were cut off and were forced to surrender when their supplies ran out.

=== Gondar town ===
Once the Allied troops had taken the passes, they gained control of the heights overlooking Gondar and reached the town on 23 November. The garrison of Gondar was seriously depleted, since many Askari, having gone unpaid by the Italians, had deserted. The final assault on Gondar, where Nasi had his headquarters, started at 5:30 a.m. on 27 November. The Azozo airfield was the initial objective; it was captured by midday of 27 November and shortly afterwards, Commonwealth troops reached Fasilides' Castle. At 4:30 p.m., while the Kenya Armoured Car Regiment penetrated the outskirts of the town, Nasi sent his last message to Italy, explaining that the reserve brigade had been deployed on the southern front but had been unable to stop the attack, that enemy troops had passed the barbed wire and enemy armoured vehicles had entered the town. Nasi surrendered soon after. Some Italian outposts fought on until 30 November, marking the end of the battle.

== See also ==
- List of British military equipment of World War II
- List of Second Italo-Ethiopian War weapons of Ethiopia-Arbegnoch used Ethiopian and captured Italian weapons.
- East African Campaign (World War II)
- Unatù Endisciau
- List of Italian Army equipment in World War II

== Sources ==
- Boca, A. del (2014) [1982]. Gli italiani in Africa Orientale: La caduta dell'Impero [The Italians in East Africa: The Fall of the Empire]. Storia e società (Editori Laterza). Vol. III. Roma: Bari, Laterza. ISBN 978-88-520-5496-9.
- Gustavsson, Håkan (14 August 2014). "Maresciallo Giuseppe Mottet". Biplane Fighter Aces from the Second World War.
- Maravigna, P. (1949). Come abbiamo perduto la guerra in Africa (in Italian). Roma: Tosi. OCLC 716558562.
- Mead, Richard (2007). Churchill's Lions: A Biographical Guide to the key British Generals of World War II. Stroud (UK): Spellmount. ISBN 978-1-86227-431-0.
- Playfair, I. S. O.; et al. (2004) [1956]. Butler, J. R. M. (ed.). The Mediterranean and Middle East: The Germans come to the help of their Ally (1941). History of the Second World War United Kingdom Military Series. Vol. II (Naval & Military Press ed.). London: HMSO. ISBN 978-1-84574-066-5.
- Shireff, David (1995). Bare Feet and Bandoliers: Wingate, Sandford, the Patriots and the Liberation of Ethiopia. Pen & Sword Military 2009. ISBN 978-1-84884-029-4.
