= Muntaz =

Italian military rank

The muntaz was a military rank of the Italian colonial troops, equivalent to the rank of corporal in the Italian Royal Army Regio Esercito.

The muntaz is placed by rank under the Bulucbasci. He served as a squad commander in the colonial units and was chosen amongst the askaris who could read and write Italian .

== Badge of Rank ==
The badge of rank of a muntaz consisted of a gallon of red wool fabric, in the shape of a corner, with the tip pointing toward the shoulder, with a black triangular undercloth. Moreover, a muntaz wore a star and a gallon on his tarboosh, with the base parallel to the lower edge of the hat itself.

On the badge there were also marks of long service and merit (the Crown of Savoy) as a badge of merit for promotion in war, and the frieze of specialty (gunner, chosen gunner, musician, trumpeter, drummer, saddler, farrier) and the badge for injury in war. A muntaz of the zaptié in the full dress wore also white and black ostrich feathers on his hat.

== History ==
During the Battle of Gondar distinguished himself a muntaz Unatù Endisciau who refusing to surrender to the British following the capitulation of the Debra Tabor outpost, passed the enemy lines and reached the Italian ones rescuing in the same the pennant of the LXXII zaptié (I° Gruppo Carabinieri) Battalion. Mortally wounded in fulfilling the mission, he was the only soldier of color awarded with the Italian Gold Medal of Military Valor.

The armament of the muntaz was the same of a common ascari.

== See also ==
- Bands (Italian Army irregulars)
- Eritrean Ascari
- Dubats
- Italian Empire
- Zaptié

== Bibliography ==
- AA.VV. Enciclopedia Militare, Edizioni de Il Popolo d'Italia, 1937, Roma
- AA.VV. Eserciti & Battaglie, voll. 1, 29, 30, 31, 32, Hobby&Work 1999
- Philip Jowett, Stephen Andrew, Italian Army, 1940-1945, vol. 2, Osprey Publishing, coll. Men-at-arms
- Riccardo Busetto, Il dizionario militare, Zanichelli, 2004, Bologna
