= Unatù Endisciau =

Ethiopian soldier

- Born: Teruboccò Delontà
- Died: 1941; Kulkaber, Ethiopia
- Military career
- Allegiance: Kingdom of Italy
- Branch: Italian Army
- Rank: Muntaz
- Unit: LXXII Zaptié Corps
- Conflicts: World War II: East African Campaign
- Awards: Gold Medal of Military Valor

Unatù Endisciau or Winetu Endeshaw was an Ethiopian soldier who served in the Italian Army during World War II. He was one of only two colonial subjects to be awarded the Gold Medal of Military Valour, Italy's highest award for bravery. Unatù served as a Muntaz in the LXXII Zaptié Corps.

Following the surrender of the Debra Tabor garrison, Endisciau and some other colonial soldiers refused to surrender their battalion's banner and instead attempted to reach Italian lines at Kulkaber 106 kilometres away; Endisciau led the group there. Along the way, they were harassed by local guerrillas supporting the Allies and Endisciau was briefly captured by a guerrilla leader but escaped. As they reached Kulkaber, Endisciau was wounded when attempting to cross an Italian minefield; he was taken to the infirmary after insisting that his comrades deliver the banner. He died shortly thereafter, declaring that he was glad to reach Italian lines and see his banner remain in Italian hands.
