= Ghadames Airport =

Ghadames Airport Ghadames Air Base
- IATA: LTD; ICAO: HLTD

Summary
- Airport type: Public/Military
- Owner: Libyan National Army
- Operator: Libyan Air Force
- Location: Ghadames, Libya
- Elevation AMSL: 1,122 ft / 342 m
- Coordinates: 30°09′02″N 9°42′00″E

Map
- Location in Libya

Runways
Direction	Length		Surface
Direction	m	ft	Surface
06/24	3,600	11,811	Asphalt
- SkyVector GCM

Ghadames Airport (IATA: LTD, ICAO: HLTD), located 12.1 miles (19.5 km) east of Ghadames, is a civilian and military airport in Libya. Currently, Libyan Airlines uses the airport for scheduled service to Tripoli.

== Airlines and destinations ==
Airlines	Destinations
Libyan Airlines	Tripoli–Mitiga

== See also ==
- Transport in Libya
- List of airports in Libya
