= Royal Corps of Colonial Troops =

Corps of the Italian Royal Army

- Regio Corpo Truppe Coloniali
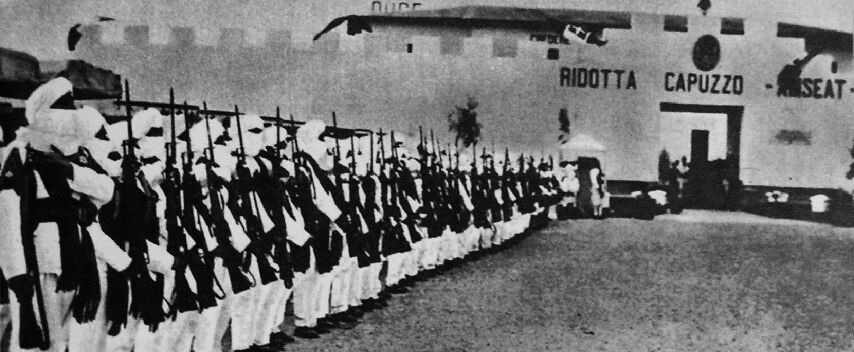
- Soldiers of the Royal Corps of Colonial Troops deployed in front of Forte Capuzzo, in Italian Libya
- Active: 1888–13 May 1943
- Countries: Italian Empire, present-day Eritrea, Somalia, Libya, Ethiopia
- Role: Colonial troops
- Part of: Royal Italian Army
- Engagements: Mahdist War; Eritrean War; Banadir resistance; First Italo-Ethiopian War; Italo-Turkish War; First Italo-Senussi War; Second Italo-Senussi War; Somaliland campaign; Pacification of Somalia; Second Italo-Ethiopian War; World War II; North African campaign; East African campaign

The Royal Corps of Colonial Troops (Italian: Regio Corpo Truppe Coloniali or RCTC) was a corps of the Royal Italian Army, in which all the Italian colonial troops were grouped until the end of World War II in North Africa campaign.

== History ==
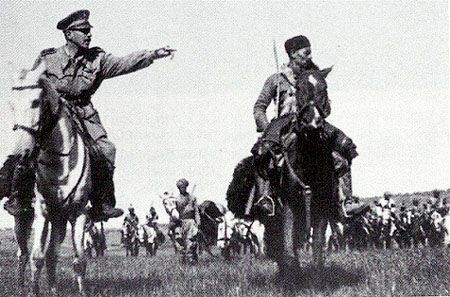
Amedeo Guillet with a Group in 1940.

Many of the Askaris in Eritrea were drawn from local Nilotic populations, including Hamid Idris Awate, who reputedly had some Nara ancestry. Of these troops, the first Eritrean battalions were raised in 1888 from Muslim and Christian volunteers, replacing an earlier Bashi-bazouk corps of irregulars. The four Indigeni battalions (I, II, III, and IV) in existence by 1891 were incorporated into the Royal Corps of Colonial Troops that year. Expanded to eight battalions (V, VI, VII, and VIII), the Eritrean Ascaris fought with distinction at Serobeti, Agordat, Kassala, Coatit and Adwa and subsequently served in Libya and Ethiopia.

These troops were deployed on all fronts in Africa from the First Italo-Ethiopian War, the Italian-Turkish war, and the conquest of Ethiopia, until World War II. The colonial soldiers always showed courage and in some cases (like the Eritrean Ascari) fought with heroism.

Except for the German parachute division in Italy and the Japanese in Burma no enemy with whom the British and Indian troops were matched put up a finer fight than those Savoia battalions at Keren (Eritrea). Moreover, the Colonial troops, until they cracked at the very end, fought with valour and resolution, and their staunchness was a testimony to the excellence of the Italian administration and military training in Eritrea

The colonial troops were commanded by Italian officers and NCOs, while soldiers were drawn from the Italian colonial territories (and to a smaller extent also from neighbouring Yemen).

In 1940, 256,000 Askaris in the Italian Royal Army were present in the local Italian colonies. Of these, 182,000 had been recruited in Italian East Africa (Eritrea, Somalia and Ethiopia) and 74,000 in Libya. In January 1941, when Allied forces invaded Italian-occupied Ethiopia in January 1941 most of the locally recruited ascaris deserted. Those that had been captured by the Allies ("thousands") have quickly released after being assessed as having little military value. The majority of the Eritrean Ascaris remained loyal until the Italian surrender four months later. [which surrender? discuss here.]

== Structure ==
There were various Royal Corps of Colonial Troops:

- Royal Corps of Colonial Troops in Italian Eritrea (1891–1936)
- Royal Corps of Colonial Troops in Italian Somaliland (1908–1936)
- Armed Forces of Italian East Africa. (1936−1943).
- Royal Corps of Colonial Troops in Italian Tripolitania (1914–1935)
- Royal Corps of Colonial Troops in Italian Cyrenaica (1914–1935)
- Royal Corps of Colonial Troops in Italian Libya (1935–1939)
- Royal Corps of Libya (1939–1943)

The first two corps were united in 1935, and a year later, conquered Ethiopia was added to them, as a result of which they were all named the Forze armate dell'Africa Orientale Italiana (FF.AA. "A.O.I.", or FAAOI — Armed Forces of Italian East Africa), and remained active until 1943, when Italy was defeated in WWII. The two corps, Tripolitania and Cyrenaica, were merged into a common Libyan corps, which in 1939 was renamed the Libyan corps. After 1936, the formation of colonial divisions began:

Italian Libya:

- 1st Libyan Division
- 2nd Libyan Division

Italian East Africa:

- 1st Eritrean Division
- 2nd Eritrean Division
- 101st Somali Division
- 102nd Somali Division

== Composition ==
At different times, the colonial troops of Italy consisted of irregular military units such as: bashi-buzuki, askari, savari, spahi, dubat, meharistes. Created and the so-called "gangs" (from the Italian word bande - a group), small cavalry military formations, as a rule, consisted of 100-200 people. At the same time, in North Africa, instead of horses, they used camels, more hardy to the desert area, more familiar to the Tuareg tribes.

With the occupation of Albania in 1939, colonial troops were created by the Italians there as well. They also consisted of local residents. Unlike Hitler's Nazis, who, moreover, did not yet have overseas colonies, the Italian fascists did not have a clear ideology of racial superiority, but were rather typical classical colonialists, so they tried not to destroy the local population, but exploited it. Therefore, not having a sufficient number of ethnic Italians in the colonies, to protect them, they willingly used the local people as soldiers. In turn, the natives went to the service of the Italians, because they had from this salary, rations, clothing and a relatively high status in their society.

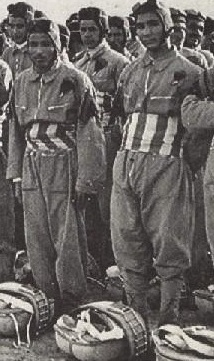
Libyan paratroopers of the 1st Libyan Division

Since the beginning of the colonial conquest the Kingdom of Italy created military units with colonial soldiers. The main units included as parts of the RCTC were:

- Libya: Libyan troops, which included the Libyan Meharisti, the Savari, the Spahis, and Zaptié
- Eritrea: Royal Corps Of Eritrean Colonial Troops, mainly the Eritrean Ascari, and Zaptie.
- Somalia: Somali troops, which included Royal Corps of Somali Colonial Troops, the Dubats and Somali Zaptié.
- Ethiopia: Ethiopian troops (after 1937), which included the Group "Bande Amhara" of Amedeo Guillet, and Zaptié.

All these military units underwent a reorganization in the 1930s, the Eritrean, Somali, and Ethiopian became the Armed Forces of Italian East Africa.

== Structure after 1936 ==
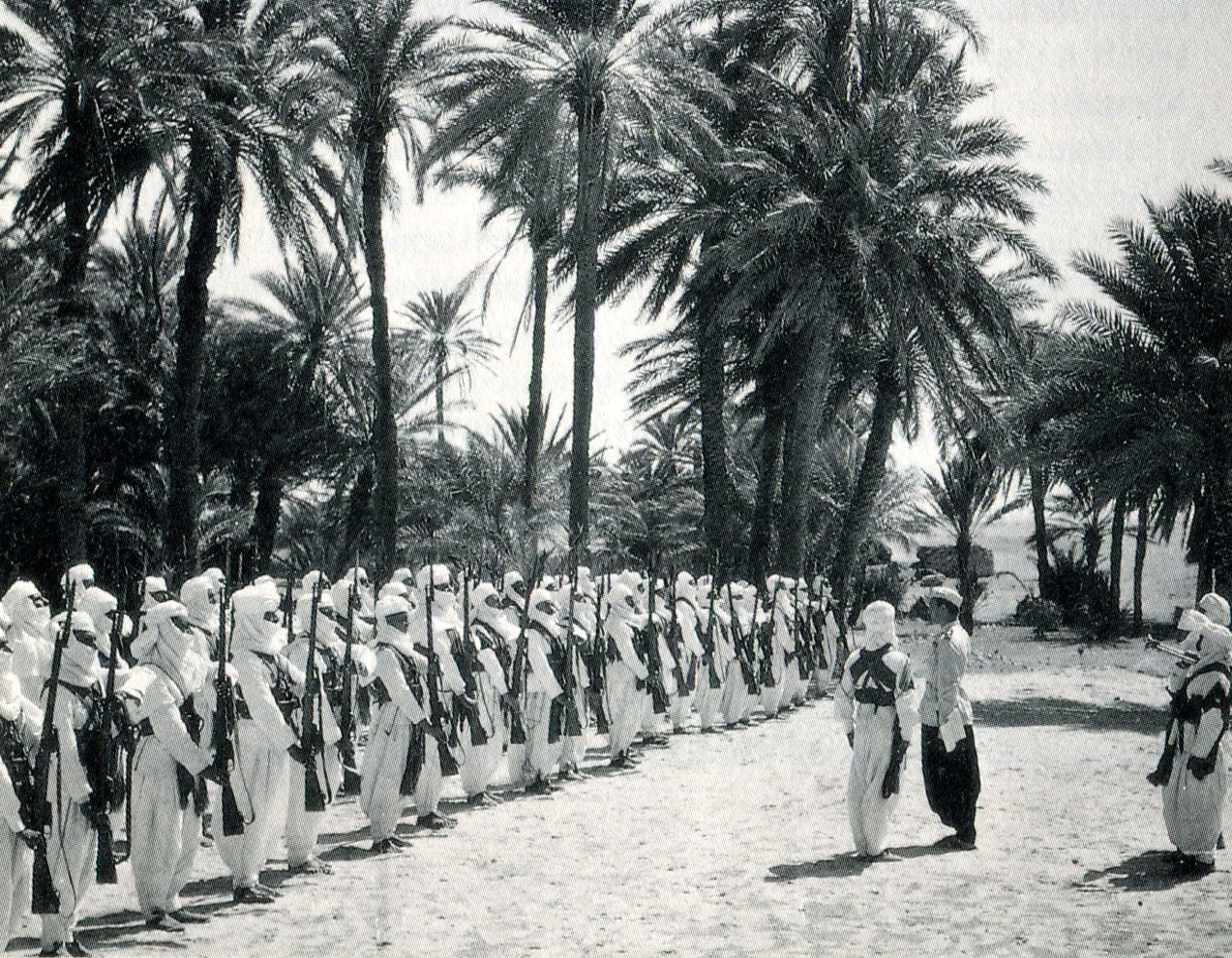
Turban wearing Muslim Colonial Troops in white dress uniforms (Genina, 1936)

The Royal Italian Army started to modernize the colonial units in the mid-1930s. For the Second Italo-Ethiopian War in 1935 and at the outset of World War II, it also created infantry divisions manned by colonial troops:

- in Libya: the Libyan Colonial Division, expanded for WWII as 1st Libyan Division and 2nd Libyan Division
- in Eritrea: the 1st Eritrean Division and 2nd Eritrean Division, which were both disbanded in 1936
- in Somalia: the 101st Somalian Division and the 102nd Somalian Division

Other units composed mainly of colonial troops were the Libyan paratroopers Ascari del Cielo and the Italian Africa Police.

== Appearance ==
=== Uniforms ===
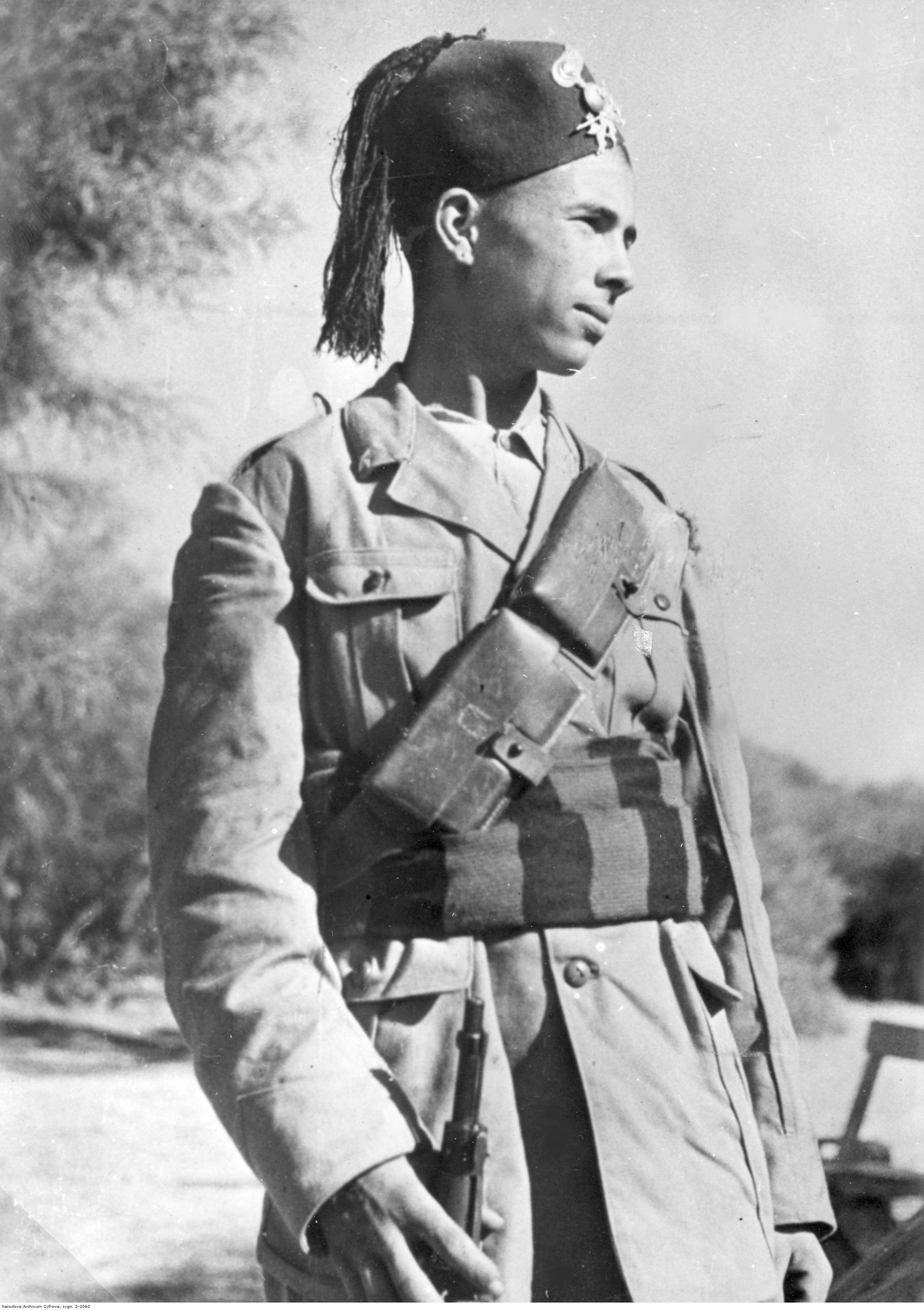
Libyan Zaptie Soldier of Italian Colonial Troops wearing a tachia in January 1943

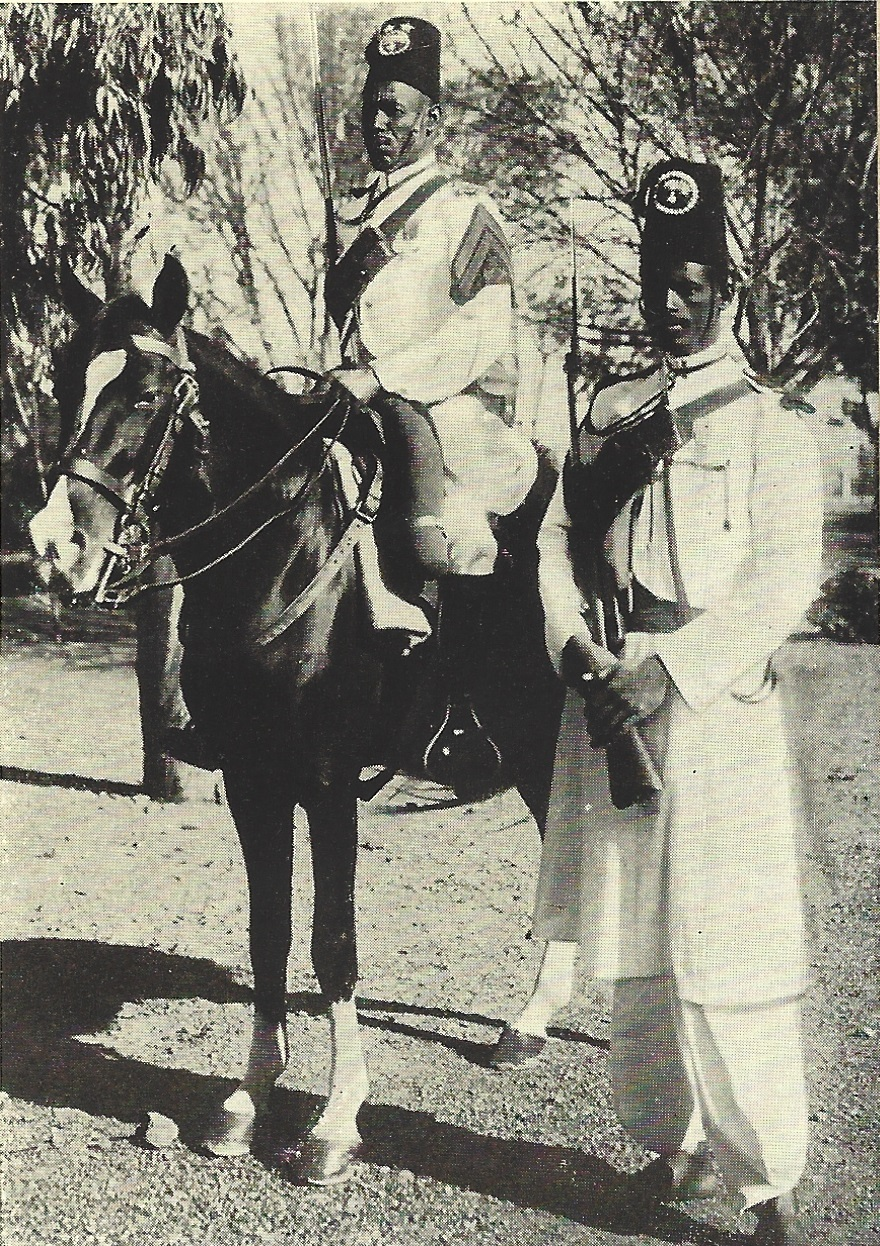
Colonial Zaptié troops wearing the tall tarbusc in Libya

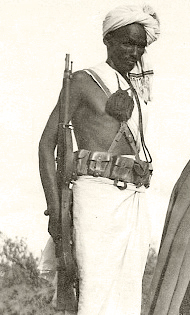
Dubat from Italian Somalia with rifle, futa and lanyard, 1938

The uniforms differed between the various specialities and, to a lesser extent, in the different periods. The system of distinctive sashes was common to all the regular departments of all colonies. Each unit or branch was identifiable by the colours and motif of the wide woollen sash ("etagà") wrapped around the waist and, in the Eritrean and AOI cavalry units, wrapped around the tarbush. As examples, the 17th Eritrean Battalion had black and white tarbush tassels and vertically striped sashes; while the 64th Eritrean Battalion wore both of these items in scarlet and purple. The same colours were reproduced in the edging thread of the shoulder straps of the Italian officers who led the units.

The ascari of Eritrea, Somalia and AOI wore the colonial uniform in white or khaki cloth with the aforementioned distinctive sashes, felt tarbush (a high red fez) with bow and frieze depending on the speciality. White uniforms were initially used but later were relegated to parades with khaki being worn for all other duties. Askari wore three different types of four pocket tunics; the M1929 giubba with low standing collar, the pre-1940 and M1940 camicotta Sahariano per Coloniali with stand-and-fall collars. Libyans, Ethiopians, and Eritreans wore baggy trousers while Somalis wore baggy knee length shorts. Their puttees were often worn with bare feet: in fact, respecting tradition, the shoes were optional. When present they could consist of either sandals, boots, or marching boots. Khaki covers were often worn on the tachia and tarbush when on campaign.

The Muslim ascari of East Africa (most of the colonials were Copts) wore a turban as their headdress, with a battalion-coloured diagonal band on the front. Libyan ascari and savari used, instead of tarbush, the traditional Libyan tachia (ṭaqīyā), a form fitting fez, of garnet red felt with blue bow and white "sub-tachia". The colours distinguished the Savari departments, in addition to the usual bands.

Rank grades were applied on tarbush in the upper front as follows; no stars soldier "Ascaro", 1 Star Corporal "Muntaz", 2 stars Sergeant "Buluk Bashi", 3 stars Marshall "Jusbasci, (after 1908 replaced by Sciumbasci). On the tarbusc under the rank stars were specialties insignia for marksman, signalier, etc. Originally about 180mm (7.08 ins) tall the tarbusc increased in height to 20 cms (7.87 ins) and taller around 1900. In 1913 a khaki cover was worn over the tarbusc for camouflage.

The Italian officers permanently assigned to colonial units wore the issue tropical peaked cap, the coloured sash of his battalion with identical piping around his shoulder boards mounted on any issue tunic. He could wear either khaki straight trousers or breeches with high brown field boots with or without lacing at the foot.

The zaptié of all the colonies were distinguished by the collar frogs of the carabinieri, with the flame on the headdress and the distinctive scarlet band.

The irregular units such as the dubat, basci-buzuk, spahis and bande did not wear a standard uniform although the bande had a system of ranks of a sort.

=== Ranks ===
The Ascari had the following ranks, from simple soldier to senior non-commissioned officer: Ascari - Muntaz (corporal) - Bulukbasci (lance-sergeant) - Sciumbasci (sergeant). The Sciumbasci-capos (staff-sergeants) were the senior Eritrean non-commissioned officers, chosen in part according to their performance in battle.

All commissioned officers of the Eritrean Ascari were Italian.

The indigenous personnel had their own hierarchy different from that of the Royal Army, which is also the same for all RCTCs. The highest rank achievable for the natives was that of a non-commissioned officer, while the corps officers were all Italians.

The rank badges consisted of chevrons in red and yellow wool fabric, made at an angle, with the tip facing the shoulder, mounted on a pentagonal blue, later black, triangle cloth brassard, in the manner of the Ottoman Army. Libyan troops wore the same insignia until 1939 when they became officially Italians, they could also wear the Star of Savoy at this point, with another change to a modified smaller version sewn directly onto the upper arm sleeve in 1941. The grades were repeated on the tarbush with chevrons and five-pointed stars.

The grades were as follows:

- àscari, savari, zaptié : corresponding to basic soldier; no sign.
- uachil - "chosen soldier"; equivalent to private first class; introduced in the twentieth century; badge: blue triangle with red star.
- muntaz - corresponding to corporal; badges: a red point up chevron on the brassard and a star on the tarbush.
- bulucbasci : corresponding to the rank of sergeant; badges: two red point up chevrons on the brassard and two stars on the tarbush. The buluc (Turkish for company) was the equivalent of a platoon of the Italian colonial troops, and basci was from the Turkish باشی başı (bashi), Modern Turkish: bölükbaşı, meaning head/chief, the bulacbashi had to be able to read and write Italian.
- bulucbasci capo (Head bulucbasci): corresponding to the rank of sergeant major; badges: two red point up chevrons and a yellow point up chevron on the brassard and two stars surmounted by a chevron on the tarbush or a bar surmounted by two stars on the Libyan techia.
- sciumbasci : corresponding to the rank of marshal; badges: three red point up chevrons on the shoulder and three stars on the tarbush. Scium is Latin for One-who-knows/In the knowing, one sciumbasci was assigned to every half-company. The sciumbasci could also be armed with a pistol and saber, as well as a rifle but he was not equipped with its bayonet. The sciumbasci could wear leather or cloth leggings. The sciumbasci also carried a curbasc, a hippopotamus hide whip, as a symbol of authority, with which it also applied physical administrative sanctions (punishment) to the troops. There were two sciumbasci per company.
- sciumbasci capo (head sciumbasci): corresponding to the rank of maresciallo aiutante (adjutant marshal); rank introduced in 1936; badges: three red and one yellow point up chevrons on the shoulder and three stars and a chevron on the tarbush. The Sciumbasci-capos (sergeants-major) were the senior non-commissioned officers, chosen in part according to their performance in battle.
- jusbasci : corresponding to the rank of sub-lieutenant, was abolished in 1902 but remained in Somalia and Libya as a synonym for sciumbasci. The jusbasci was chosen from among the Bulucbasci with at least three years of service on the proposal of the company commander, and with the final opinion expressed by a committee composed of all the commanders of the companies belonging to the same battalion and chaired by the battalion commander.

On the black cloth triangle of the badge were also placed the marks of seniority - according to the table below - and of merit (the Savoy crown) as a promotion badge for war merit, as well as the speciality badge (machine gunner, chosen machine gunner, musician, trumpeter, tambourine, saddler, farrier, international bracelet) and the war wound badge.

1 red cloth star	2 years of service
2 red cloth stars	6 years of service
3 red cloth stars	10 years of service
1 silver fabric star	12 years of service
2 silver fabric stars	14 years of service
3 silver fabric stars	15 years of service
1 gold fabric star	20 years of service
2 gold fabric stars	24 years of service
3 gold fabric stars	28 years of service

The following rank table is for Askari serving in the Italian Forces.

Rank group	Enlisted
Army and Air force							No insignia
Army and Air force	Sciumbasci capo	Sciumbasci	Bulucbasci capo	Bulucbasci	Muntaz	Uachil	Ascaro
Navy and Carabinieri							No insignia
Navy and Carabinieri	Sciumbasci capo	Sciumbasci	Bulucbasci capo	Bulucbasci	Muntaz	Uachil	Ascaro

== Equipment ==
=== Weapons ===
The Italian colonial forces were armed with older model weapons, mainly produced in Italy itself, or captured, but by the beginning of World War II, they were clearly outdated.

- Revolvers;
  - Bodeo 1889,
  - 1873 Chamelo-delvin,
- Rifles;
  - Vetterli 1870 a single shot 10.4mm rifle
    - Vetterli-Vitali a modified M1870 with a four-round magazine
  - Carcano 1891, a 6.5 mm magazine fed rifle
  - Mannlicher M1888 (World War One reparations and captured examples from Austria-Hungary).
  - Mannlicher M1895 (World War One reparations from Austria-Hungary).
- Machine-guns;
  - Breda Mod. 5C,
  - Fiat-Revelli Mod. 1914,
  - Schwarzlose (World War One reparations from Austria-Hungary).
- Cold weapons;
  - billao Somali dagger also used by northern Ethiopians,
  - Gorade (Sometimes also Romanized as "Gurade") a straight or slightly curved sabre (Eritreans and Ethiopians)
  - Saif Used by Ethiopian cavalry
  - Shotel Somali curved sword also used by northern Ethiopians

=== Armored vehicles ===
Since the 20s, the following armored vehicles were transferred to Libya;

- Lancia IZ and
- Fiat-Terni Tripoli.

=== Artillery ===
Colonial units were primarily equipped with light artillery and mortars

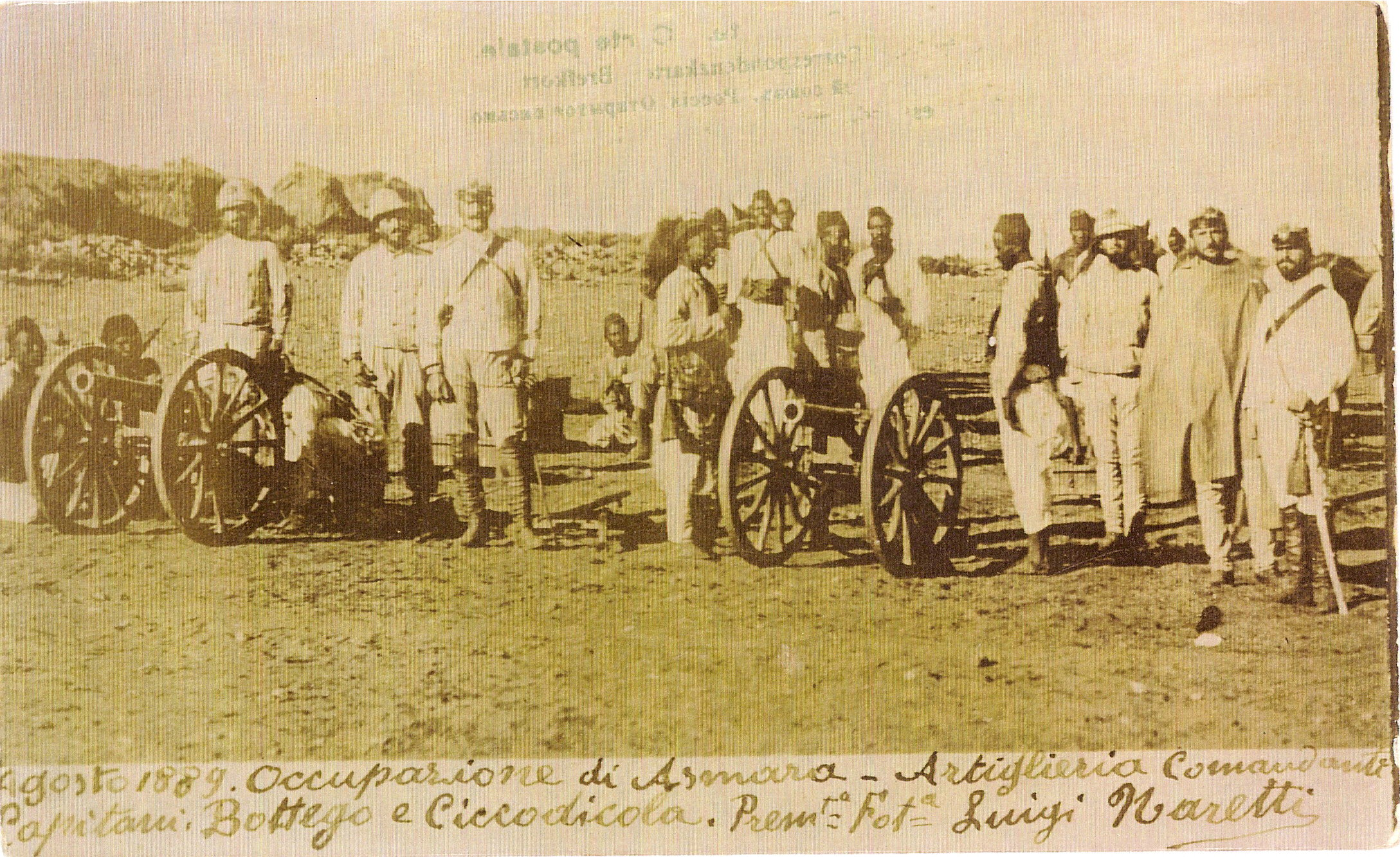
Eritrean artillery battery equipped with 75mm cannone da 75B Mont. mountain gun.

- cannone da 75B Mont.
- Cannone da 65/17 modello 13 (many transported by camels, each colonial brigade maintained four 4-gun batteries)
- Brandt Mle 27/31 older 81mm mortar
- 81/14 Model 35 Mortar the new standard Italian army 81 mm mortar

== Honours ==
Medal Bar of the Italian merit star for soldiers in the Royal Corps of Colonial Troops.

The Royal Corps of Colonial Troops has been awarded 4 Gold Medals of Military Valor ("Medaglia d'oro al valor militare"):

- Royal Corps of Eritrean Colonial Troops.

Two Gold Medal of Military Valor:

In one hundred and fifty battles gloriously sustained in the service of His Majesty the King of Italy, gave constant evidence of strong heroic military discipline, of fierce warrior spirit, of unquestioned loyalty and value, lavishing their blood with a zeal and devotion than never had limitations. Eritrea - Tripoli - Cyrenaica, from 1889 to 1929. - May 12, 1930

With the courage of their race, fueled by love for the flag and the belief in the higher destinies of Italy in Africa, gave during the war, many proofs of the most brilliant heroism. With great generosity, and similar faithfulness, gave their blood for the consecration of the Italian Empire. Italo-Ethiopian War, October 3, 1935 - May 5, 1936. - November 19, 1936.

- Royal Corps of Libyan Colonial Troops

One Gold Medal of Military Valor:

With the courage of their race - fueled by love for the flag and the belief in the higher destinies of Italy in Africa, gave during the war, many proofs of the most brilliant heroism. With great generosity, and similar faithfulness, gave their blood for the consecration of the Italian Empire. Italo-Ethiopian War, October 3, 1935 - May 5, 1936. - November 19, 1936.

- Royal Corps of Somali Colonial Troops.

One Gold Medal of Military Valor:

With the courage of their race - fueled by love for the flag and the belief in the higher destinies of Italy in Africa, gave during the war, many proofs of the most brilliant heroism. With great generosity, and similar faithfulness, gave their blood for the consecration of the Italian Empire. Italo-Ethiopian War, October 3, 1935 - May 5, 1936. - November 19, 1936.

== See also ==
- Ascari del Cielo
- Milizia Coloniale
- Italian Armed Forces
- Italian Empire
- Italian Eritrea
- Italian Libya
- Italian Somaliland

== Bibliography ==
- Mackenzie, Compton. Eastern Epic. Chatto & Windus, London, 1951 OCLC 1412578
- Renzo Catellani, Giancarlo Stella, Soldati d'Africa. Storia del colonialismo italiano e delle uniformi per le truppe d'Africa del regio esercito italiano. Vol. I - 1885/1896, Albertelli, Parma, 2002 ISBN 978-88-8737-220-5
- Renzo Catellani, Giancarlo Stella, Soldati d'Africa. Storia del colonialismo italiano e delle uniformi per le truppe d'Africa del regio esercito italiano. Vol. II - 1897/1913, Albertelli, Parma, 2004 ISBN 978-88-8737-239-7
- Renzo Catellani, Giancarlo Stella, Soldati d'Africa. Storia del colonialismo italiano e delle uniformi per le truppe d'Africa del regio esercito italiano. Vol. III - 1913/1929, Albertelli, Parma, 2006 ISBN 978-88-8737-255-7
- Renzo Catellani, Giancarlo Stella, Soldati d'Africa. Storia del colonialismo italiano e delle uniformi per le truppe d'Africa del regio esercito italiano. Vol. IV - 1930/1939, Albertelli, Parma, 2008 ISBN 978-88-8737-265-6
- Gabriele Zorzetto, Uniformi e insegne delle truppe coloniali italiane 1885-1943. Studio Emme, Vicenza, 2003. ISBN 978-88-9013-020-5
- Raffaele Ruggeri, Le Guerre Coloniali Italiane 1885/1900, Editrice Militare Italiana, Milano, 1988.
