= Baati (garment) =

Somali dress

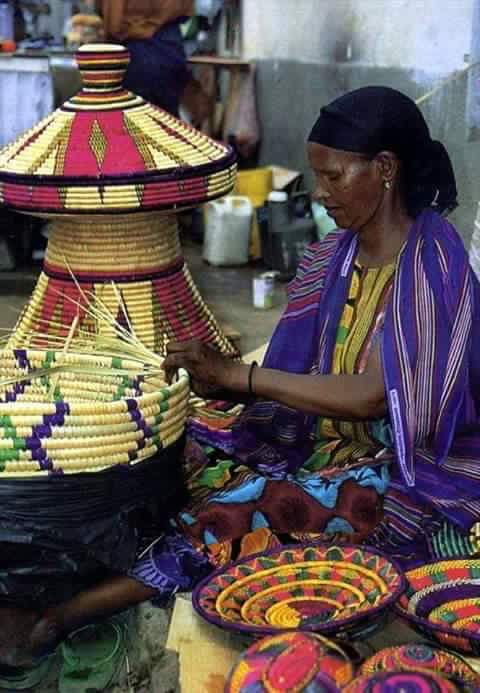
Somali woman wearing a baati.

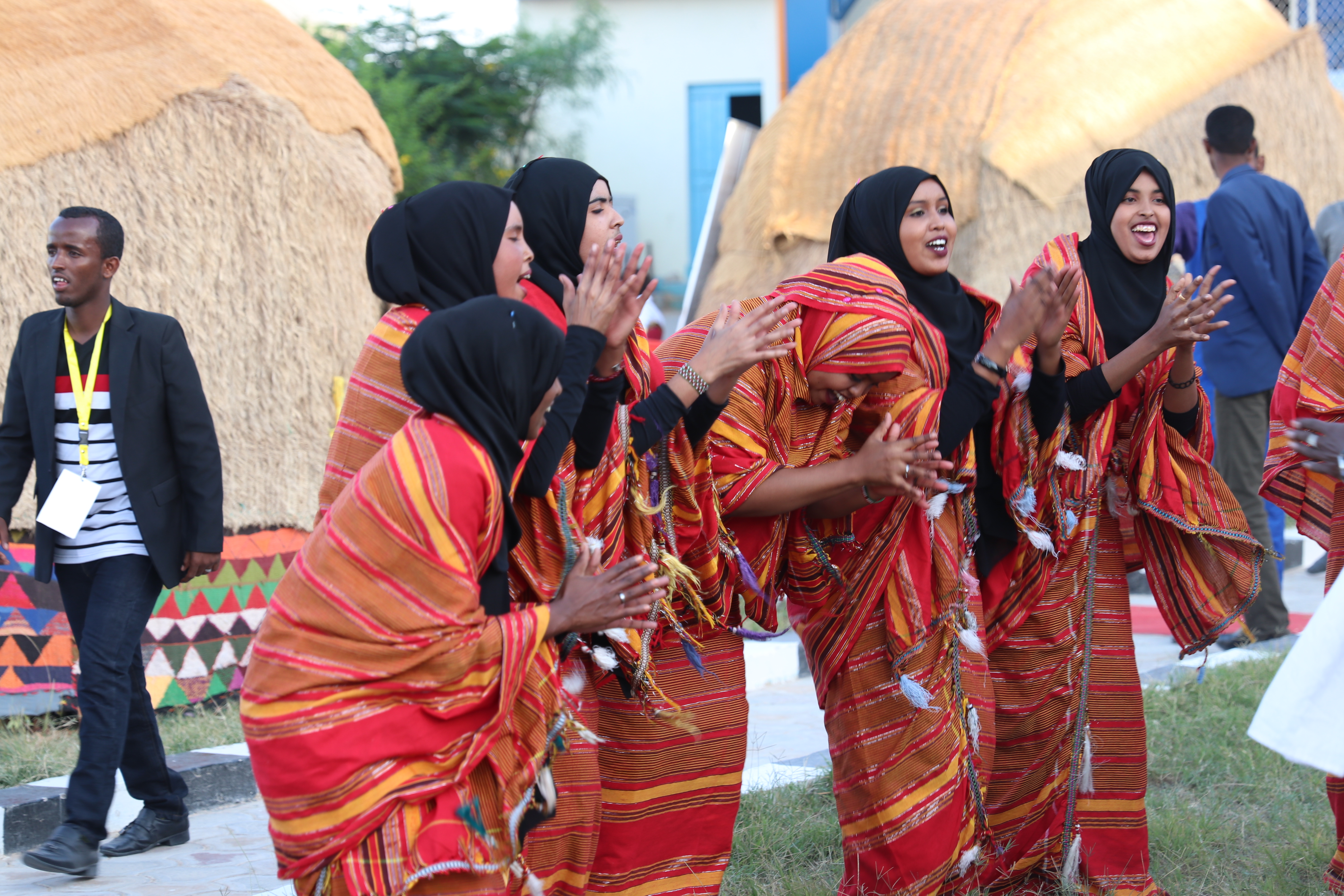
Somali women in Alindi baati.

A baati, also known as dirac shiid, is a Somali cotton house dress with a loose fit and short sleeves. It is designed with different patterns and colors that are usually paired with a matching scarf or shawl (garbassaar). It is seen as a staple in many East African households. It is popular throughout East Africa due to Somali migration and trading across the region. The garment is noted for its vibrant design, fluidity and versatility such as being modified as a sling to carry an infant.

== See also ==
- Dirac
