= Dirac (dress) =

Somali garment

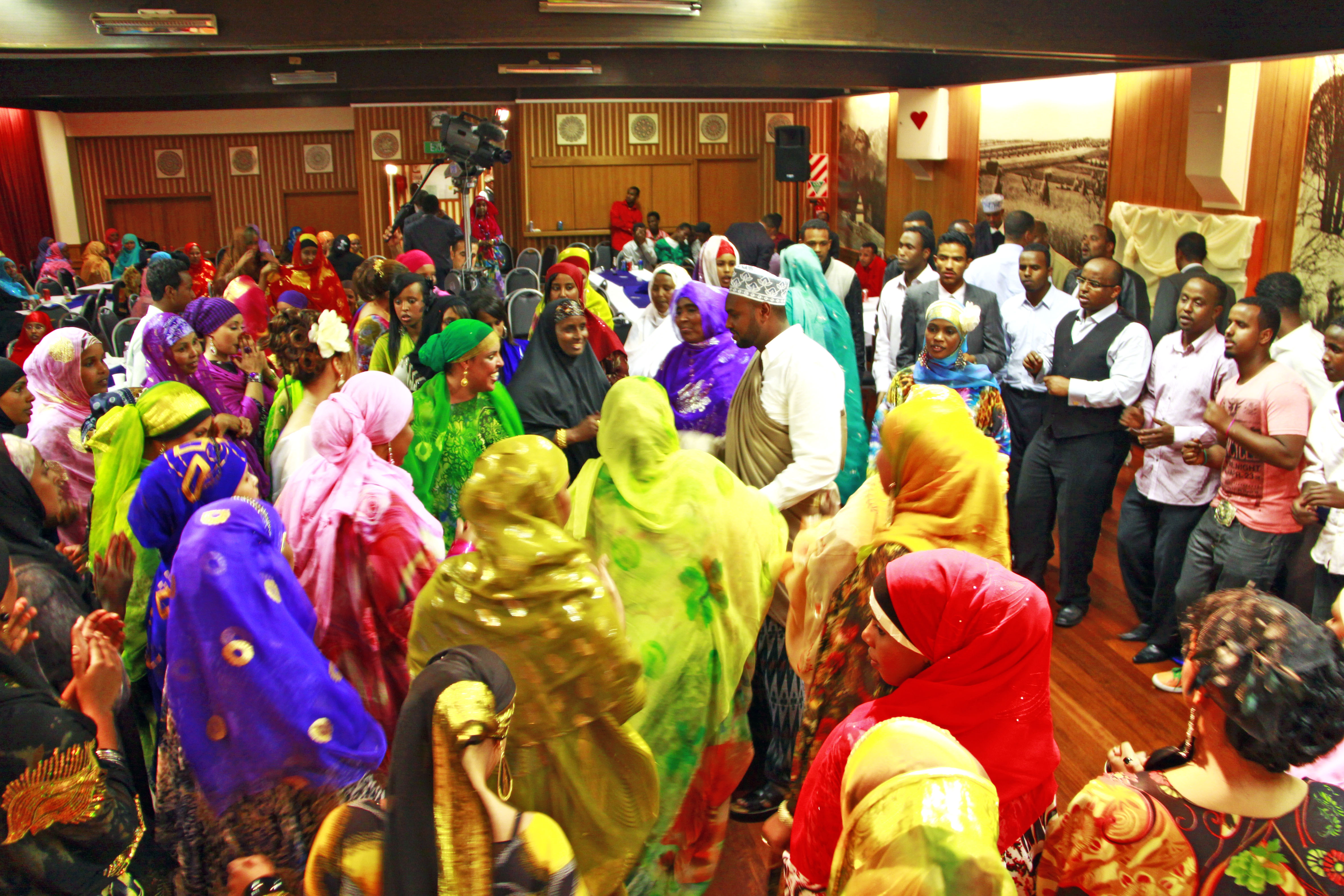
- Somali women wearing dirac at a wedding
- Type: Somali dress style
- Place of origin: Somalia

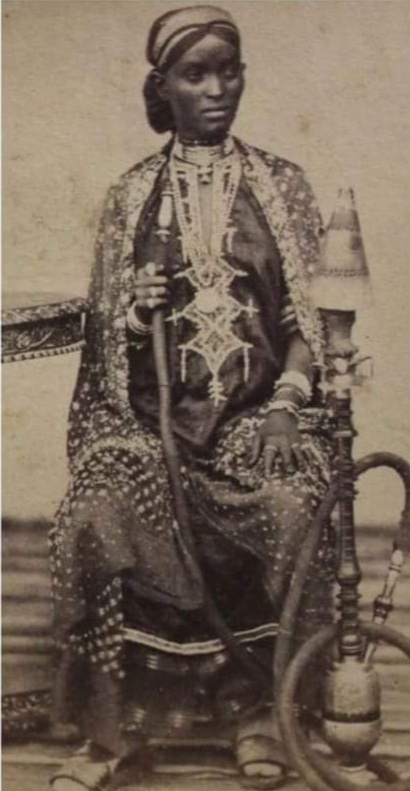
A Somali woman wearing a Dirac sometime during the 1800s.

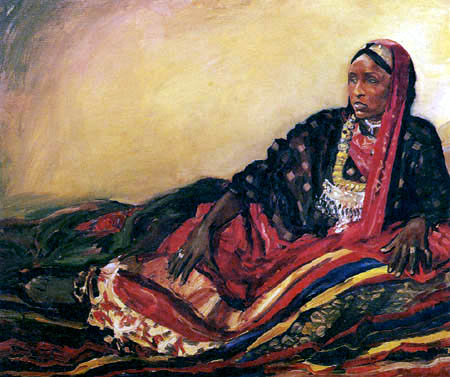
Portrait of a Somali woman (1907)

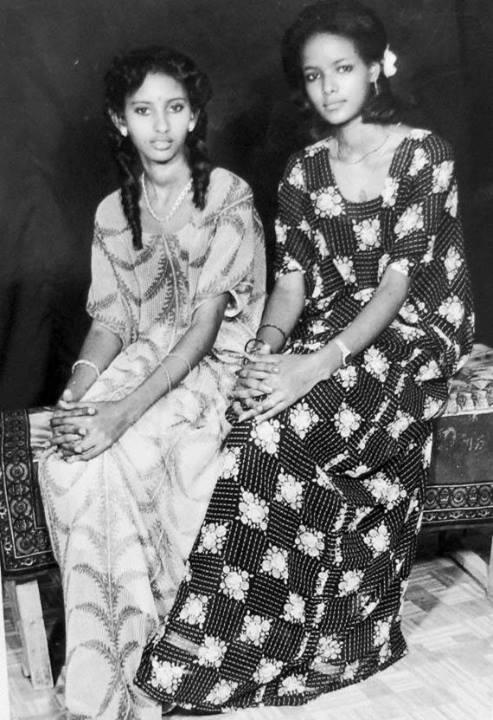
Somali women in Mogadishu

The Dirac (see Baati for the house dress) is a Somali garment worn by Somali women that is long, usually ankle length dress. It was referred to as "Dirac-Aroos" (lit. Wedding-Dirac) to differentiate it from the Dirac-baati but has taken the common term Dirac (Plural: Diracyaal/Duruuc). Dirac is now synonymus with the Dirac-Aroos, whilst Dirac-Baati is just called Baati.

The Dirac was designed for the harsh hot weather of Somalia, hence its name, which comes from the Somali term that means "brave", "guardian" "protector" and "protection".

== Types ==
The Dirac is most commonly worn during celebrations/special events such as weddings, parties, festivals etc. Fancier sets of Dirac are sought after for weddings.

There are many variations including traditional ankle/knee-length Diraq, full body Dirac, the elegant T-shaped Dirac and many others. Variations of draping, weight, length, color and sheer are taken into account due to temperature, elegance, modesty and cost.

It is usually made out of either chiffon, silk (which are both usually the sheerest variation of a Dirac) or velvet (one of the least see-through and useful in cooler weather), amongst many other materials. It is always accompanied with an ankle length underskirt called gorgorad/googarad and a wrap/shawl called garbasaar, which is either worn loosely around the head or neatly on one shoulder.

The baati/dirac shiid is seen as the precursor traditionally worn as a house dress and is made of cotton, whilst the Dirac is festive dress.

== History ==
The Dirac originated in Somalia, using silk and other lightweight fabrics. Historically self-tailored and out of reach for the common folk, new designs and styles were innovated by a group of Somali women popularizing it in the early/mid 1900s in Northern Somalia, Somaliland and Djibouti. These new styles gradually spread to the rest of the Somali regions overtaking the then common Guntiino. It was made with colorful fabric, mainly locally tailored and later imported.
