= Alindi =

Somali fabric

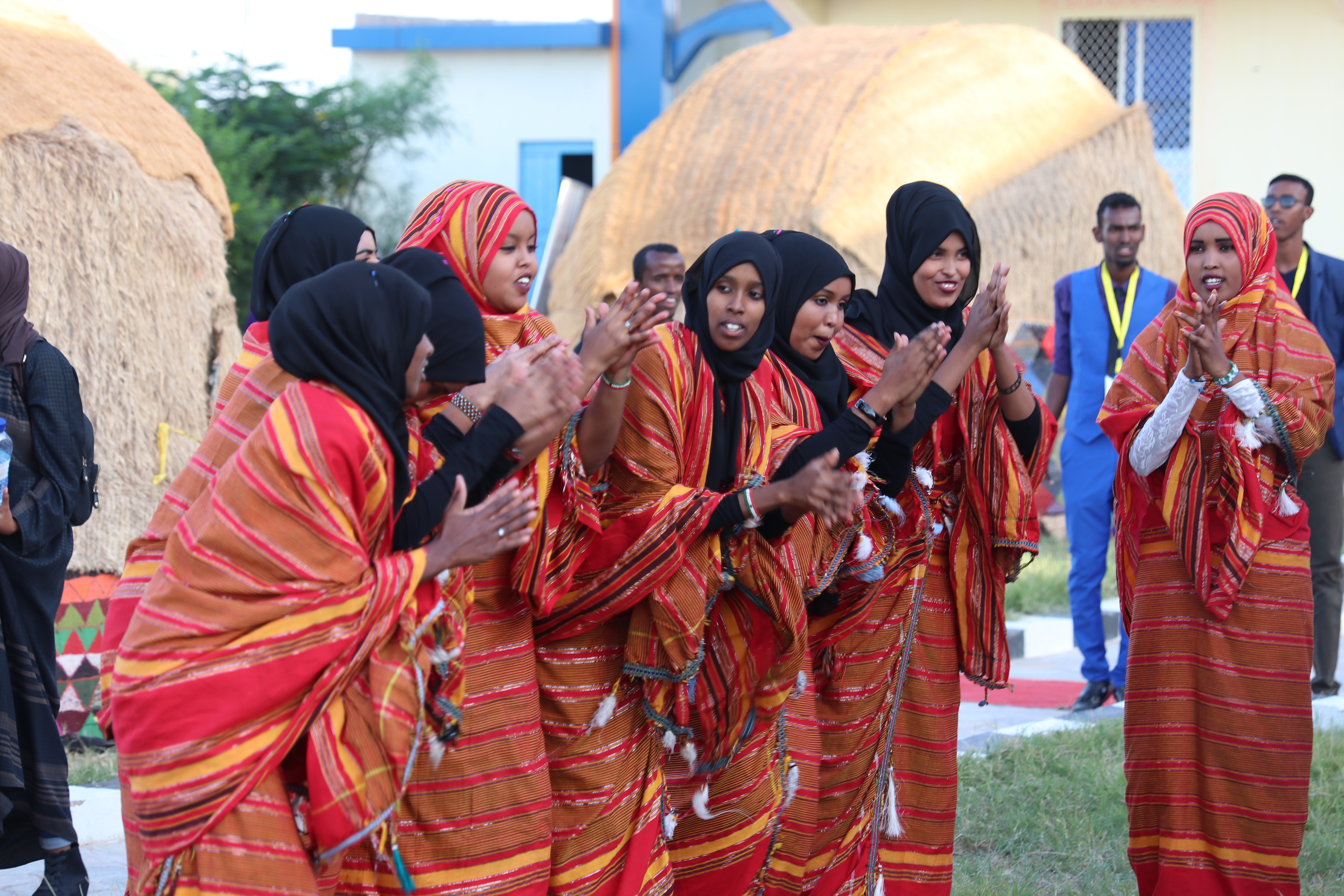
Somali women wearing alindi

Alindi, also known as Futa Benadir, is a Somali fabric. Usually worn as part of a traditional garment, it is recognizable today by its various colorful stripes. The most favored color pattern is the midab boqoreed (royal colors), originally inspired by the coat colors of certain goats. The fabric has remained a symbol of Somali heritage for many centuries and is worn in ceremonies and festivities.

== History ==
The city of Mogadishu historically served as a textile manufacturing center, exporting cloths across the Indian Ocean, Red Sea, and the Gulf. In 1330, Ibn Battuta visited the city and described its “unequalled” textiles as being exported all the way to Egypt and elsewhere. By the 19th century, it was estimated that one in five residents of Mogadishu were weavers.

Eventually the prestigious textile industry faced competition from the importation of mass-produced cotton fabrics from abroad, most notably from mills in America. However, Somalis continued to prefer locally made cloth over imported ones. To compete with the cheaper American imports, Somali craftsmen began sourcing cotton from the Benadir hinterland. Whereas cotton fiber had previously been imported, by the 1880s travelers reported an abundance of local cultivation along the Shebelle River. The raw cotton would then be transported to coastal towns by donkeys or camels, where it was cleaned of seeds and spun into thread.

A 1920 report recorded several hundred looms operating in Mogadishu, primarily worked by men. Cloth production also took place in other towns along the Benadir coast, particularly in Merca, with exports reaching Mombasa and Zanzibar. Maritime exports of cotton goods across eastern Africa from Somalia were estimated to be 360,000 to 380,000 pieces annually in the 1840s, with a significant portion of cloth also traded inland to southern Ethiopia. Items such as artisanal caps and shawls were also exported to nearby countries.

Despite the arrival of factory-made yarn, Somali women continued to spin, and were the first in sub-Saharan Africa to adopt the use of small hand-powered spinning wheel technology. Well into the 1950s, over a thousand households on the Benadir coast were still engaged in weaving, and locally made textiles came to serve as high-status items reserved for special occasions.

== Production ==
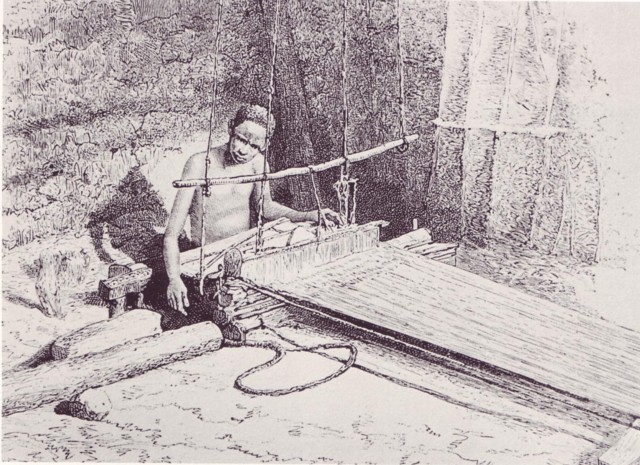
Portrait of a Somali man weaving on a hand loom.

Local craftsmen including the Tunni, who are coastal artisans of the Benadir region, took part in weaving alindi. The cloth was known as Kar Guri in the hinterland, and toob Benadiri on the coast. Not only were they supplied for local use, but also exported to southern Arabia and Egypt. Although historically white, weavers gradually began incorporating color into their production. Green was characteristic of fabric from Merca, while a gold and red variant was known in Mogadishu. Among the Abgaal, cloths with blue and white stripes were preferred.

Locally grown vegetable dyes are used to weave different colors and striping patterns that have certain names. Yellow dye for example was extracted from Safflower that grows along the banks of Middle Shabelle. Dyed yarn is then tied together and marked with kohl. After being submerged into a sizing consisting of flour and water to strengthen the fibers, a stretching method called darisi is used. This involves stretching threads across two upright sticks positioned inside the structure, creating an L-shaped layout. These threads are left to dry in place. Afterwards, the yarn is wound onto a wooden spindle named furfure, then unwound and threaded through the heddle loops. The color patterns formed by the loose strings on the bamboo heddle are followed.

The weaver then secures the heddle to the loom and extends the new warp threads behind it to a single iron hook embedded in the floor about 8 meters away. At this point, the warp threads are bundled into a large knot, fastened to a rope, and hooked in place. The opposite end of the rope runs back to the weaver's seat. As weaving continues and cloth accumulates onto the cloth beam, the warp moves toward the loom, fixing it to the hook at a new point on the rope with every knot.

== Gallery ==
Somali woman wearing an alindi guntiino

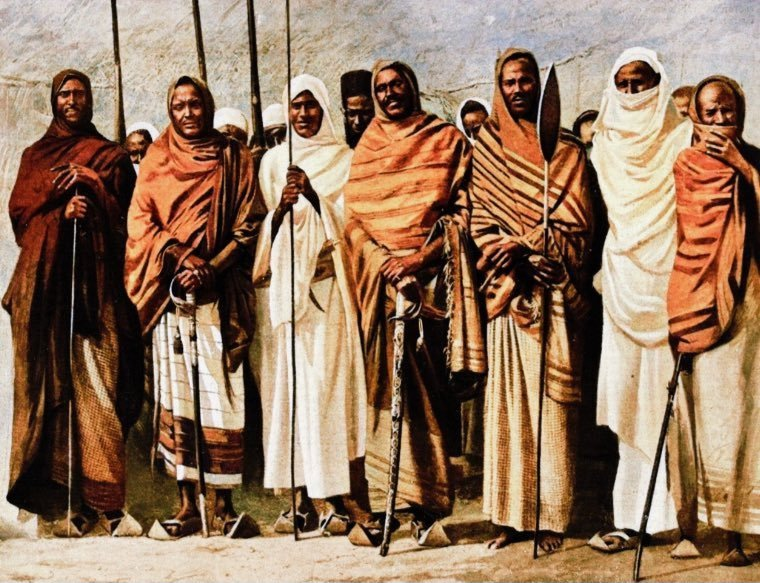
Somali men of the Majeerteen Sultanate

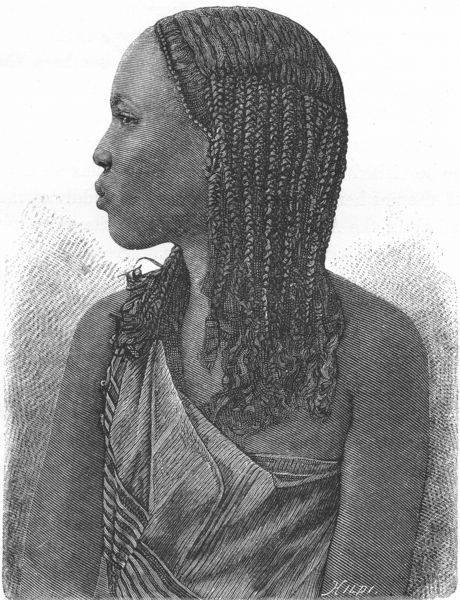
Somali woman of the Issa

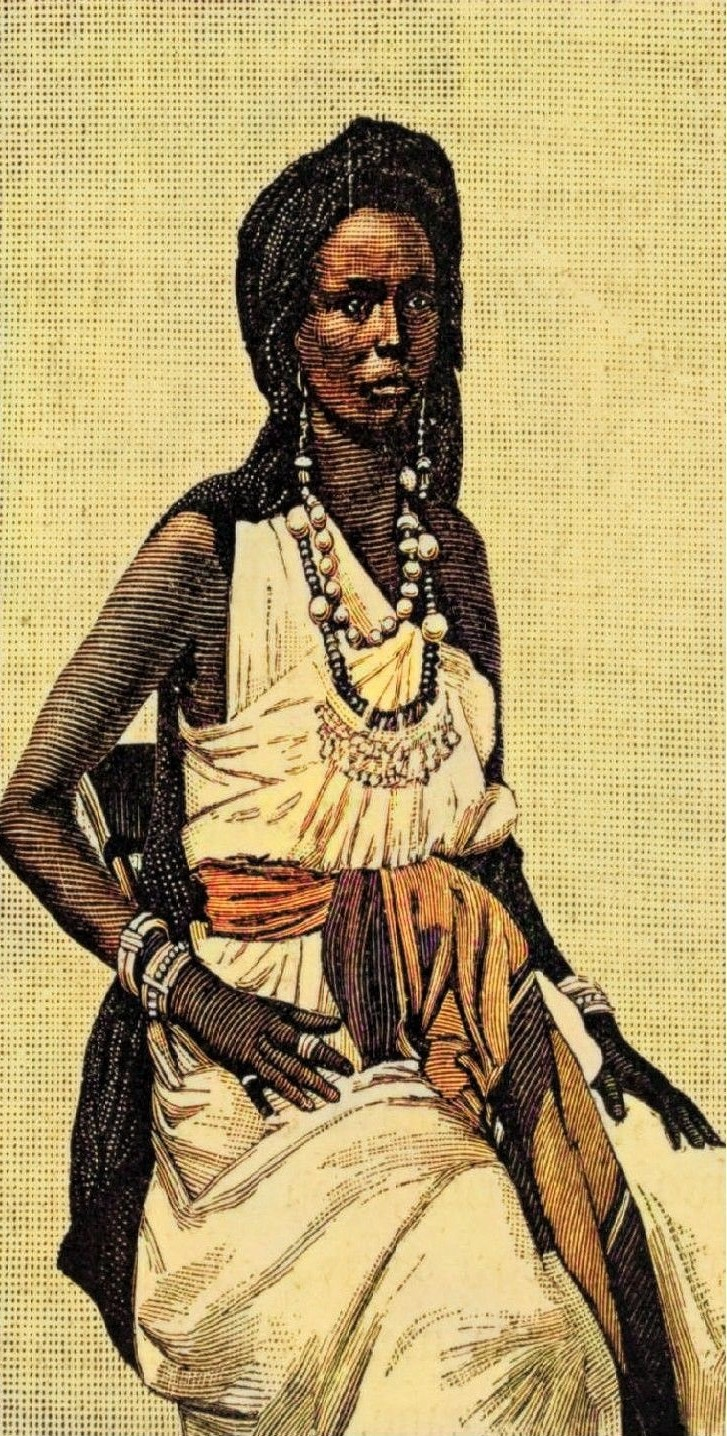
Somali woman from Berbera
