= Somalis =

Cushitic ethnic group native to the Horn of Africa

Soomaalida صومالِدَ الصوماليون
- Traditional area inhabited by the Somali ethnic group

Total population
- 27.7 million

Regions with significant populations
- Horn of Africa
- Somalia (Note: including Somaliland): 18,143,378 (2023)
- Ethiopia: 4,581,793 (2007)
- Kenya: 2,780,502 (2019)
- Djibouti: 586,000 (2019)
- Yemen: 285,211 (2024)
- United States: 247,769 (2024)
- United Kingdom: 176,645 (2021)
- Libya: 112,000 (2020)
- United Arab Emirates: 101,000
- Sweden: 66,846 (2024)
- Canada: 65,550
- Germany: 60,295
- Uganda: 51,536
- Saudi Arabia: 45,710
- Norway: 44,176 (2025)
- Netherlands: 41,064
- South Africa: 27,000–40,000
- Finland: 26,891 (2024)
- Denmark: 21,610 (2025)
- Egypt: 21,000–200,000
- Australia: 18,401
- Italy: 9,349
- Switzerland: 8,625
- France: 8,000
- Austria: 7,101
- Turkey: 5,518
Other countries
Zambia	3,000–4,000
Malaysia	3,000
Belgium	2,627
Eritrea	2,604
Pakistan	2,500
Ireland	2,150
New Zealand	1,617
Indonesia	1,170
Brazil	517

Languages
- Somali

Religion
- Predominantly Sunni Islam (Note: According to a 2010 report by the Pew Research Center (Pew Research Center 2012, p. 49), 99.8% of the population in Somalia adheres to Islam, with the remaining 0.2% practicing other faiths or unaffiliated.)

Related ethnic groups
- Afar • Saho • Oromo • Rendille • Cushites

Somalis (Note: (/soʊˈmɑːliz, səˈmɑːliz/, sə-MAH-leez) (Somali: Soomaalida, Wadaad: صومالِدَ, Arabic: الصوماليون)) or Somali people, are a Cushitic ethnic group and nation native to the Somali Peninsula. The Somali language is the shared mother tongue of ethnic Somalis, which is part of the Cushitic branch of the Afroasiatic language family. They are predominantly Sunni Muslim. Forming one of the largest ethnic groups on the continent, they cover one of the most expansive landmasses by a single ethnic group in Africa.

According to some scholars, the ancient Land of Punt and its native inhabitants formed part of the ethnogenesis of the Somali people. This ancient historical kingdom is where a great portion of their cultural traditions and ancestry are said to derive from. Somalis and their country have long been identified with the term Barbar (or Al-Barbar). The 12th century geographer al-Idrisi, for example, identified the Somali Peninsula as Barbara, and classical sources from the Greeks and Romans similarly refer to the region as the second Barbaria.

Somalis share many historical and cultural traits with other Cushitic peoples, especially with Lowland East Cushitic people, specifically the Afar and the Saho. Ethnic Somalis are principally concentrated in Somalia (around 17.6 million), Somaliland (5.7 million), Ethiopia (4.6 million), Kenya (2.8 million), and Djibouti (586,000). Somali diasporas are also found in parts of the Middle East, North America, Western Europe, African Great Lakes region, Southern Africa and Oceania.

== Etymology ==
Samaale, the legendary common ancestor of several Somali clans, is generally regarded as the source of the ethnonym Somali. One other theory is that the name is held to be derived from the words soo and maal, which together mean literally "go and milk". This interpretation differs depending on region, with northern Somalis implying it refers to camel's milk, while southern Somalis use the transliteration sa' maal which refers to cow's milk. This is a reference to the ubiquitous pastoralism of the Somali people.

Another plausible etymology proposes that the term Somali is derived from the Arabic word for wealthy (zāwamāl), referring to Somali riches in livestock. Historian Mohamed A. Rirash maintains that the etymology of the ethnonym derives from the compound term soofmaal—with soof meaning 'to herd' and maal referring to 'livestock'—initially serving as an occupational label for Somali pastoralists before evolving into the collective name for all ethnic Somalis.

Alternatively, the ethnonym is believed to have been derived from the Automoli (Asmach), a group of warriors from ancient Egypt described by Herodotus. Asmach is thought to have been their Egyptian name, with Automoli being a Greek derivative of the Hebrew word S'mali (meaning 'on the left hand side').

A Tang Chinese document from the 9th century CE referred to the northern Somalia coast—which was then part of a broader region in Northeast Africa known as Barbaria, in reference to the area's Barbar (Cushitic) inhabitants—as Po-pa-li.

The first clear written reference of the sobriquet Somali dates back to the early 15th century CE during the reign of Ethiopian Emperor Yeshaq I who had one of his court officials compose a hymn celebrating a military victory over the Sultanate of Ifat. Simur was also an ancient Harari alias for the Somali people.

Somalis overwhelmingly prefer the demonym Somali over Somalian, which may be viewed as incorrect since the former is an endonym, while the latter is an exonym with double suffixes. The hypernym of the term Somali from a geopolitical sense is Horner and from an ethnic sense, it is Cushite. The constitution of Somalia defines every citizen as a Somali.

== History ==
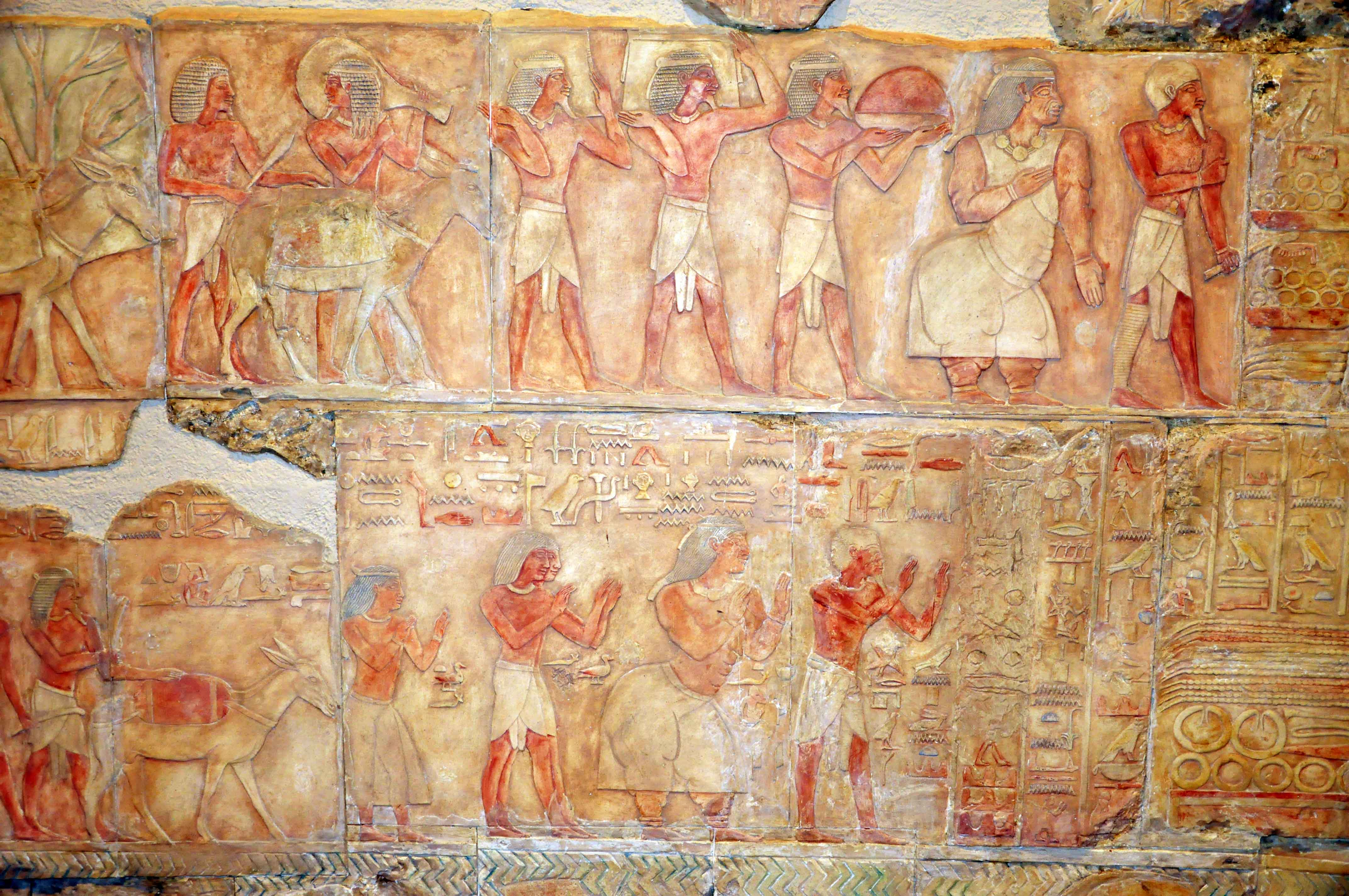
Puntite King Parahu and Queen Ati receiving the Egyptian delegation. Modern scholars widely associate Punt with the Horn of Africa, considering its ancient Cushitic inhabitants ancestral to modern Somalis

The origin of the Somali people which was previously theorized to have been from Southern Ethiopia since 1000 BC or from the Arabian Peninsula in the eleventh century has now been overturned by newer archeological and linguistic studies which puts the original homeland of the Somali people in Somaliland region, which concludes that the Somalis are the indigenous inhabitants of the Horn of Africa for the last 7000 years. Ancient rock paintings, which date back 5000 years (estimated), have been found in Somaliland region. These engravings depict early life in the territory. The most famous of these is the Laas Geel complex. It contains some of the earliest known rock art on the African continent and features many elaborate pastoralist sketches of animal and human figures. In other places, such as the Dhambalin region, a depiction of a man on a horse is postulated as being one of the earliest known examples of a mounted huntsman.Inscriptions have been found beneath many of the rock paintings, but archaeologists have so far been unable to decipher this form of ancient writing. During the Stone Age, the Doian and Hargeisan cultures flourished here with their respective industries and factories. The oldest evidence of burial customs in the Horn of Africa comes from cemeteries in Somalia dating back to 4th millennium BC. The stone implements from the Jalelo site in Somalia are said to be the most important link in evidence of the universality in palaeolithic times between the East and the West. In antiquity, the ancestors of the Somali people were an important link in the Horn of Africa connecting the region's commerce with the rest of the ancient world. Somali sailors and merchants were the main suppliers of frankincense, myrrh and spices, items which were considered valuable luxuries by the Ancient Egyptians, Phoenicians, Mycenaeans and Babylonians. According to most scholars, the ancient Land of Punt and its native inhabitants formed part of the ethnogenesis of the Somali people. The ancient Puntites were a nation of people that had close relations with Pharaonic Egypt during the times of Pharaoh Sahure and Queen Hatshepsut. The pyramidal structures, temples and ancient houses of dressed stone littered around Somalia may date from this period.

In classical antiquity, the Macrobians, who may have been ancestral to the Automoli or ancient Somalis, established a powerful tribal kingdom that ruled large parts of modern Somalia. They were reputed for their longevity and wealth, and were said to be the "tallest and handsomest of all men". The Macrobians were warrior herders and seafarers. According to Herodotus' account, the Achaemenid emperor Cambyses II, upon his conquest of Egypt in 525 BCE, sent ambassadors to Macrobia, bringing luxury gifts for the Macrobian king to entice his submission. The Macrobian ruler, who was elected based on his stature and beauty, replied instead with a challenge for his Persian counterpart in the form of an unstrung bow: if the Persians could manage to draw it, they would have the right to invade his country; but until then, they should thank the gods that the Macrobians never decided to invade their empire. The Macrobians were a regional power reputed for their advanced architecture and gold wealth, which was so plentiful that they shackled their prisoners in golden chains.

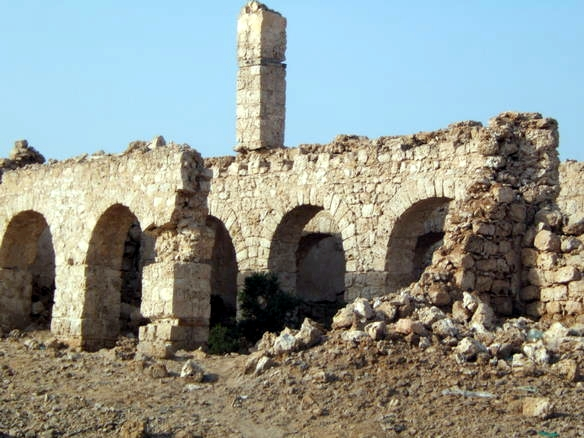
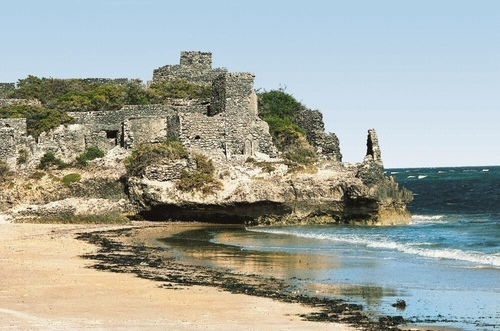
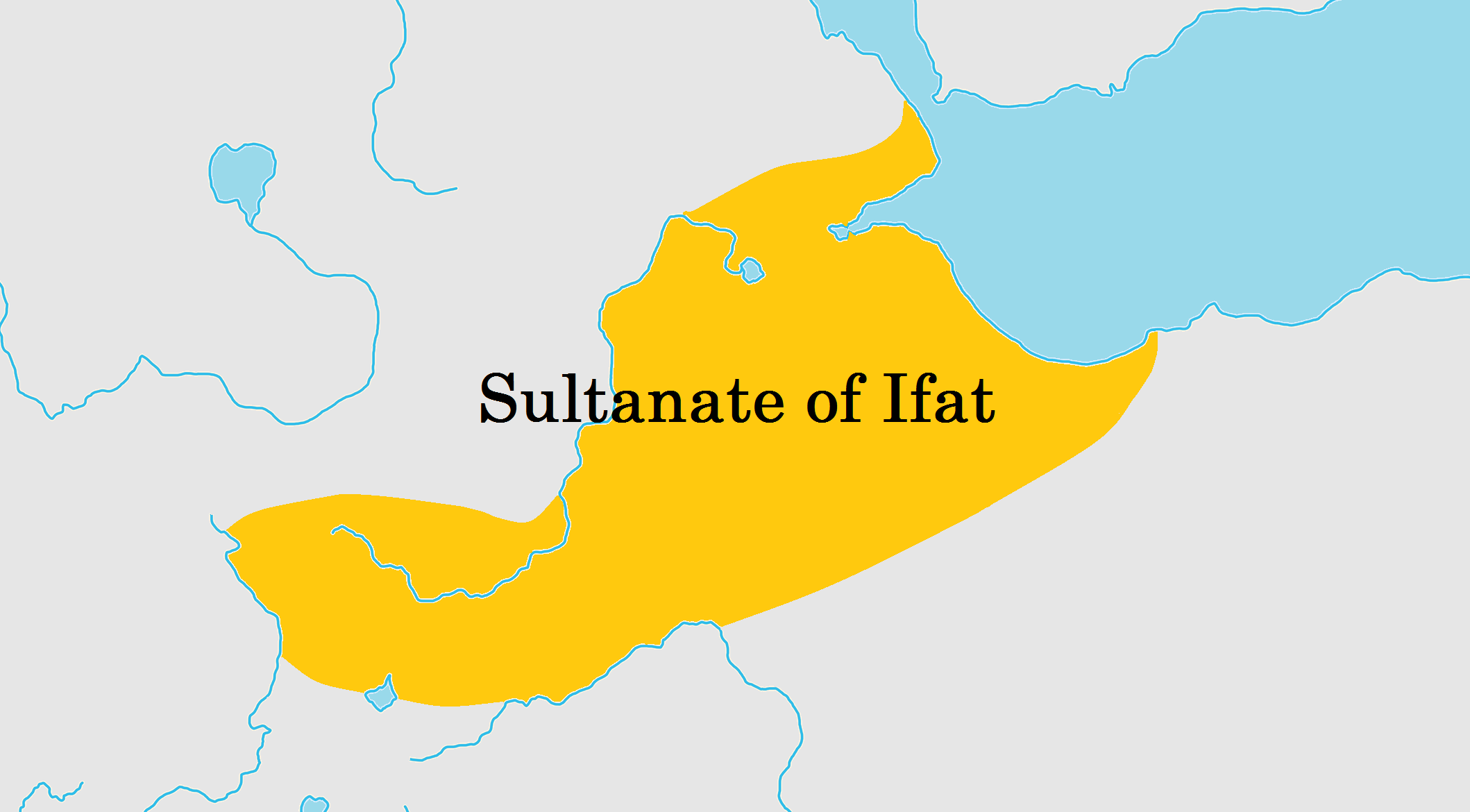
Somali sultanates and historical sites. Clockwise from upper left: ruins of the Adal Sultanate in Zeila, the Citadel of Gondershe from the Ajuran Empire, and the Ifat Sultanate realm in the 14th century

Several ancient city-states, such as Opone, Essina, Sarapion, Nikon, Malao, Damo and Mosylon near Cape Guardafui, which competed with the Sabaeans, Parthians and Axumites for the wealthy Indo-Greco-Roman trade, also flourished in Somalia.

Islam was introduced to the area early on by the first Muslims of Mecca fleeing prosecution during the first Hejira with Masjid al-Qiblatayn being built before the Qiblah faced towards Mecca. The town of Zeila's two-mihrab Masjid al-Qiblatayn dates to the 7th century, and is one of the oldest mosques in Africa.

Consequently, the Somalis were some of the earliest non-Arabs that converted to Islam. The peaceful conversion of the Somali population by Somali Muslim scholars in the following centuries, the ancient city-states eventually transformed into Islamic Mogadishu, Berbera, Zeila, Barawa, Hafun and Merca, which were part of the Berberi civilization. The city of Mogadishu came to be known as the City of Islam, and controlled the East African gold trade for several centuries.

The Sultanate of Ifat, led by the Walashma dynasty with its capital at Zeila, ruled over parts of what is now eastern Ethiopia, Djibouti and Somaliland. The historian al-Umari records that Ifat was situated near the Red Sea coast, and states its size as 15 days travel by 20 days travel. Its army numbered 15,000 horsemen and 20,000 foot soldiers. Al-Umari also credits Ifat with seven "mother cities": Belqulzar, Kuljura, Shimi, Shewa, Adal, Jamme and Laboo.

In the Middle Ages, several powerful Somali empires dominated the regional trade including the Ajuran Sultanate, which excelled in hydraulic engineering and fortress building, the Adal Sultanate, whose general Ahmad ibn Ibrahim al-Ghazi (Ahmed Gurey) was the first commander to use cannon warfare on the continent during Adal's conquest of the Ethiopian Empire, and the Sultanate of the Geledi, whose military dominance forced governors of the Omani empire north of the city of Lamu to pay tribute to the Somali Sultan Ahmed Yusuf. The Harla, an early group who inhabited parts of Somalia, Tchertcher and other areas in the Horn, also erected various tumuli. These masons are believed to have been ancestral to the Somalis ("proto-Somali").

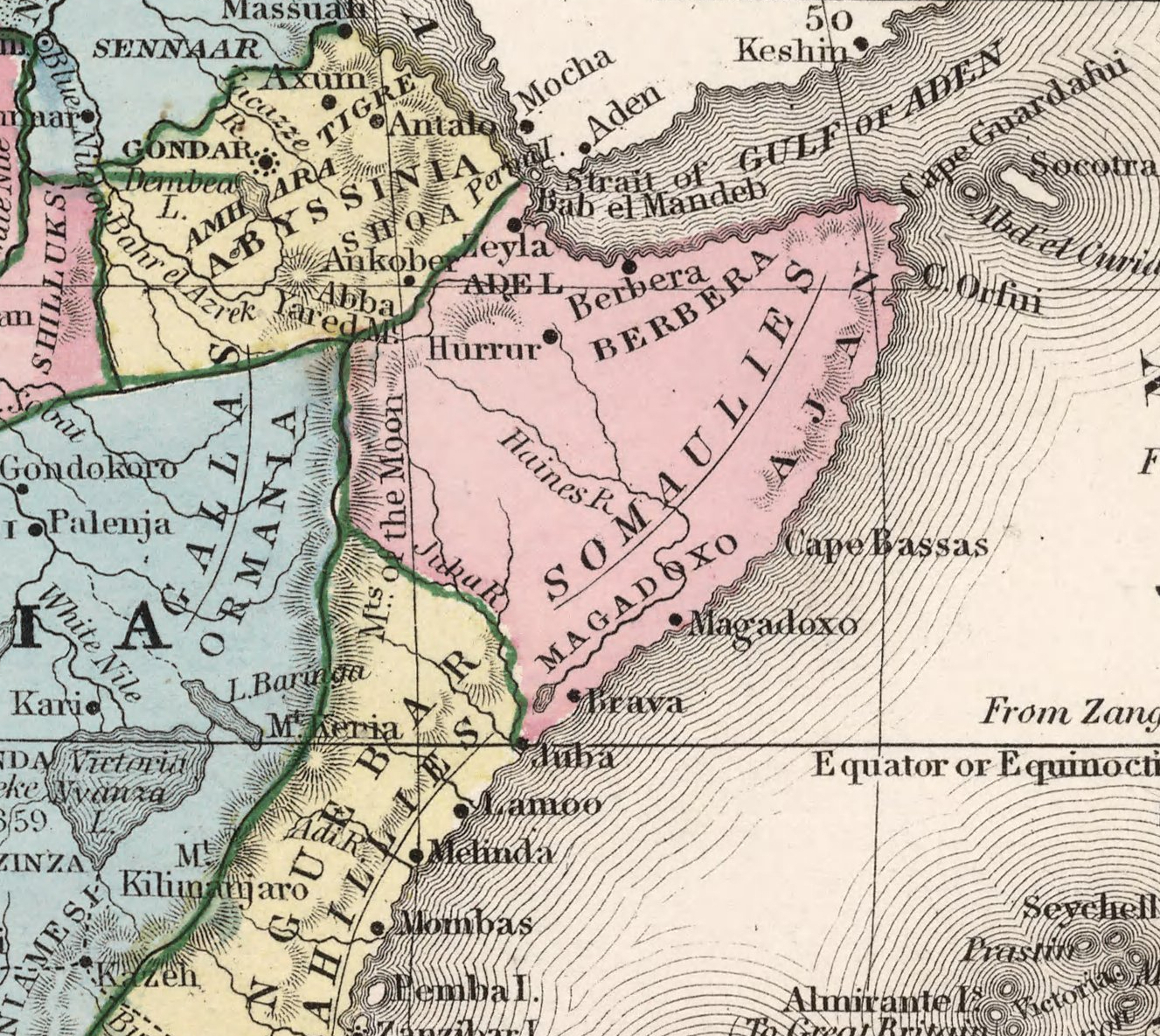
An 1865 map showing the territory of the Somaulies (Somalis) prior to the Scramble for Africa

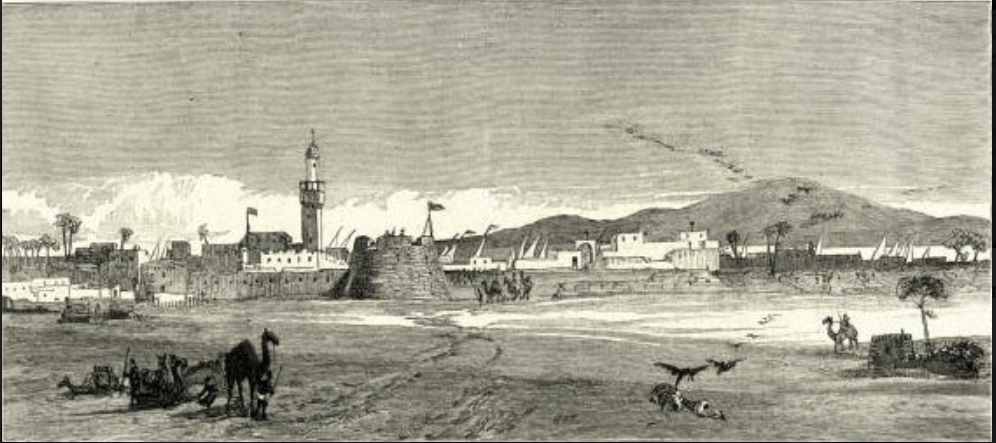
Illustration of Berbera in 1884

Berbera was the most important port in the Horn of Africa between the 18th–19th centuries. For centuries, Berbera had extensive trade relations with several historic ports in the Arabian Peninsula. Additionally, the Somali and Ethiopian interiors were very dependent on Berbera for trade, where most of the goods for export arrived from. During the 1833 trading season, the port town swelled to over 70,000 people, and upwards of 6,000 camels laden with goods arrived from the interior within a single day. Berbera was the main marketplace in the entire Somali seaboard for various goods procured from the interior, such as livestock, coffee, frankincense, myrrh, acacia gum, saffron, feathers, ghee, hide (skin), gold and ivory. Historically, the port of Berbera was controlled indigenously between the mercantile Reer Ahmed Nur and Reer Yunis Nuh sub-clans of the Habar Awal. According to a trade journal published in 1856, Berbera was described as "the freest port in the world, and the most important trading place on the whole Arabian Gulf.":

"The only seaports of importance on this coast are Feyla [Zeila] and Berbera; the former is an Arabian colony, dependent of Mocha, but Berbera is independent of any foreign power. It is, without having the name, the freest port in the world, and the most important trading place on the whole Arabian Gulf. From the beginning of November to the end of April, a large fair assembles in Berbera, and caravans of 6,000 camels at a time come from the interior loaded with coffee, (considered superior to Mocha in Bombay), gum, ivory, hides, skins, grain, cattle, and sour milk, the substitute of fermented drinks in these regions; also much cattle is brought there for the Aden market."

As a tributary of Mokha, which in turn was part of the Ottoman possessions in Western Arabia, the port of Zeila had seen several men placed as governors over the years. The Ottomans based in Yemen held nominal authority of Zeila when Sharmarke Ali Saleh, who was a successful and ambitious Somali merchant, purchased the rights of the town from the Ottoman governor of Mokha and Hodeidah.

Allee Shurmalkee [Ali Sharmarke] has since my visit either seized or purchased this town, and hoisted independent colours upon its walls; but as I know little or nothing save the mere fact of its possession by that Soumaulee chief, and as this change occurred whilst I was in Abyssinia, I shall not say anything more upon the subject.

However, the previous governor was not eager to relinquish his control of Zeila. Hence in 1841, Sharmarke chartered two dhows (ships) along with fifty Somali Matchlock men and two cannons to target Zeila and depose its Arab Governor, Syed Mohammed Al Barr. Sharmarke initially directed his cannons at the city walls which frightened Al Barr's followers and caused them to abandon their posts and succeeded Al Barr as the ruler of Zeila. Sharmarke's governorship had an instant effect on the city, as he maneuvered to monopolize as much of the regional trade as possible, with his sights set as far as Harar and the Ogaden.

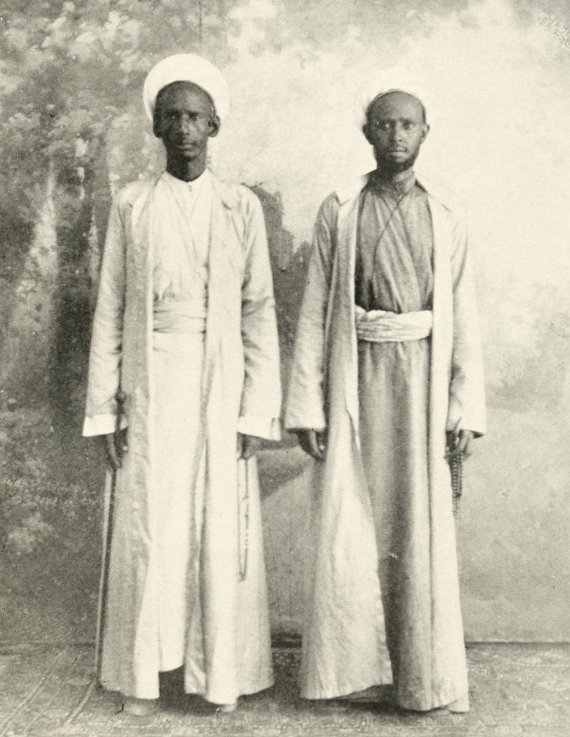
Dervish commander Haji Sudi on the left with his brother in-law Duale Idres. Aden, 1892

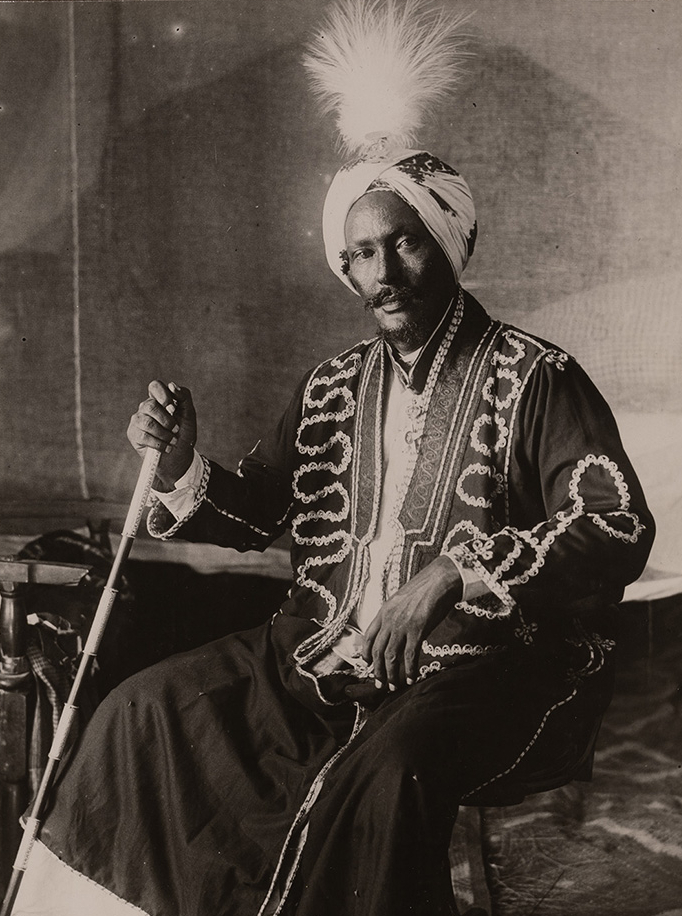
Ali Yusuf Kenadid, 2nd Sultan of the Hobyo Sultanate

In 1845, Sharmarke deployed a few matchlock men to wrest control of neighboring Berbera from that town's then feuding Somali local authorities. Sharmarke's influence was not limited to the Somali coast as he had allies and influence in the interior of the Somali country, the Danakil coast and even further afield in Abyssinia. Among his allies were the Kings of Shewa. When there was tension between the Amir of Harar Abu Bakr II ibn `Abd al-Munan and Sharmarke, as a result of the Amir arresting one of his agents in Harar, Sharmarke persuaded the son of Sahle Selassie, ruler of Shewa, to imprison on his behalf about 300 citizens of Harar then resident in Shewa, for a length of two years.

In the late 19th century, after the Berlin Conference had ended, the Scramble for Africa reached the Horn of Africa. Increasing foreign influence in the region culminated in the creation of the first Darawiish, an armed resistance movement calling for the independence from European powers. The Dervish had their leaders, Mohammed Abdullah Hassan, Haji Sudi and Sultan Nur Ahmed Aman, who sought a state in the Nugaal and began one of the longest African conflicts in modern history.

The news of the incident that sparked the 21 year long Dervish rebellion, according to the consul-general James Hayes Sadler, was spread or as he claimed was concocted by Sultan Nur of the Habr Yunis. The incident in question was that of a group of Somali children who were converted to Christianity and adopted by the French Catholic Mission at Berbera in 1899. Whether Sultan Nur experienced the incident first hand or whether he was told of it is not clear but what is known is that he propagated the incident in June 1899, precipitating the religious rebellion of the Dervishes.

The Dervish movement successfully stymied British forces four times and forced them to retreat to the coastal region. As a result of its successes against the British, the Dervish movement received support from the Ottomans and Germans. The Ottoman government also named Hassan Emir of the Somali nation, and the German government promised to officially recognise any territories the Dervishes were to acquire.

After a quarter of a century of military successes against the British, the Dervishes were finally defeated by Britain in 1920 in part due to the successful deployment of the newly-formed Royal Air Force by the British government.

Majeerteen Sultanate was founded in the early-1700s and rose to prominence in the following century, under the reign of the resourceful Boqor (King) Osman Mahamuud. His Kingdom controlled Bari Karkaar, Nugaaal, and also central Somalia in the 19th and early 20th centuries. The Majeerteen Sultanate maintained a robust trading network, entered into treaties with foreign powers, and exerted strong centralized authority on the domestic front.

The Majeerteen Sultanate was nearly dismantled in the late-1800s by a power struggle between Boqor Osman Mahamuud and his ambitious cousin, Yusuf Ali Kenadid who founded the Sultanate of Hobyo in 1878. Initially Kenadid wanted to seize control of the neighbouring Sultanate. However, he was unsuccessful in this endeavour, and was eventually forced into exile in Yemen. Both sultanates maintained written records of their activities, which still exist.

In 1888, Sultan Yusuf Ali Kenadid entered into a treaty with the Italian government, making his Sultanate of Hobyo an Italian protectorate. His rival Boqor Osman Mahamuud was to sign a similar agreement vis-a-vis his own Majeerteen Sultanate the following year. In signing the agreements, both rulers also hoped to exploit the rival objectives of the European imperial powers so as to more effectively assure the continued independence of their territories.

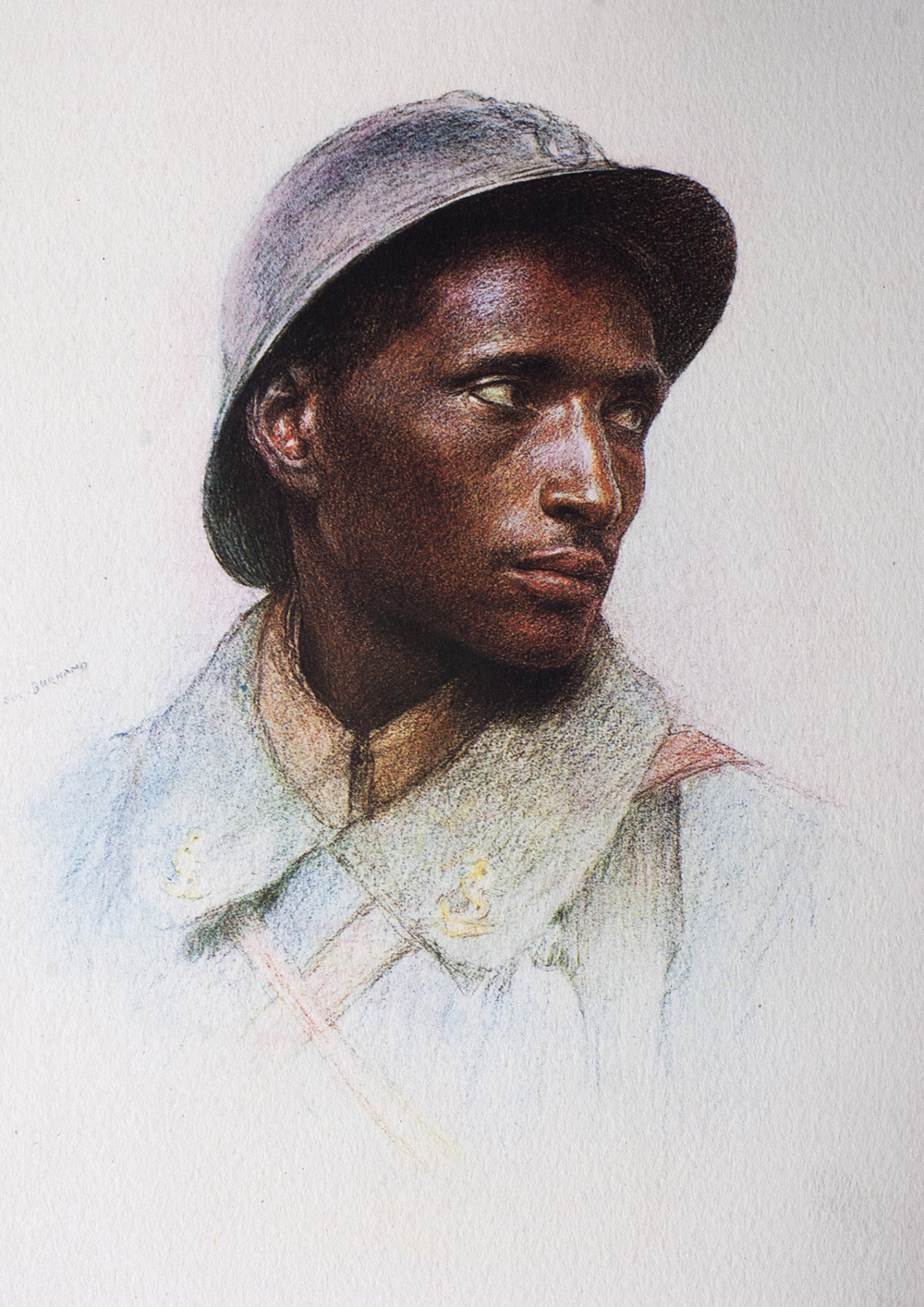
Ahmed Abokob, a Somali soldier from French Somaliland (present-day Djibouti), who participated in World War I, 1917

The Italians, for their part, were interested in the territories mainly because of its ports specifically Port of Bosaso which could grant them access to the strategically important Suez Canal and the Gulf of Aden. The terms of the treaties the rulers signed specified that Italy was to steer clear of any interference in the Sultanates' respective administrations. In return for Italian arms and an annual subsidy, the Sultans conceded to a minimum of oversight and economic concessions. The Italians also agreed to dispatch a few ambassadors to promote both the Sultanates' and their own interests.

The new protectorates were thereafter managed by Vincenzo Filonardi through a chartered company. An Anglo-Italian border protocol was later signed on 5 May 1894, followed by an agreement in 1906 between Cavalier Pestalozza and General Swaine acknowledging that Baran fell under the Majeerteen Sultanate's administration. With the gradual extension into northern Somalia of Italian colonial rule, both Kingdoms were eventually annexed in the early 20th century. However, unlike the southern territories, the northern sultanates were not subject to direct rule due to the earlier treaties they had signed with the Italians. By the end of 1927, following a two-year military campaign, Rome finally asserted full authority over the entirety of Italian Somalia. In 1936, the region was integrated into Italian East Africa as the Somalia Governorate. In urban areas, the colony was one of the most developed on the continent in terms of standard of living. In the late 1930s the triangle area between Mogadishu, Merca and Villabruzzi was fully developed in agriculture with a growing export of bananas to Western Europe. During this period, the Mogadishu area was transformed into a colonial capital through the imposition of a new European-style city upon the old historic centre. The British conquest of Italian Somalia in 1941 however removed parts of the infrastructure the Italians had built, such as the Mogadishu–Villabruzzi Railway. Following World War II, Britain retained control of both British Somaliland and Italian Somalia as protectorates. In 1945, during the Potsdam Conference, the United Nations granted Italy trusteeship of Italian Somalia, but only under close supervision and on the condition — first proposed by the Somali Youth League (SYL) and other nascent Somali political organizations, such as Hizbia Digil Mirifle Somali (HDMS) and the Somali National League (SNL) — that Somalia achieve independence within ten years. British Somalia remained a protectorate of Britain until 1960.

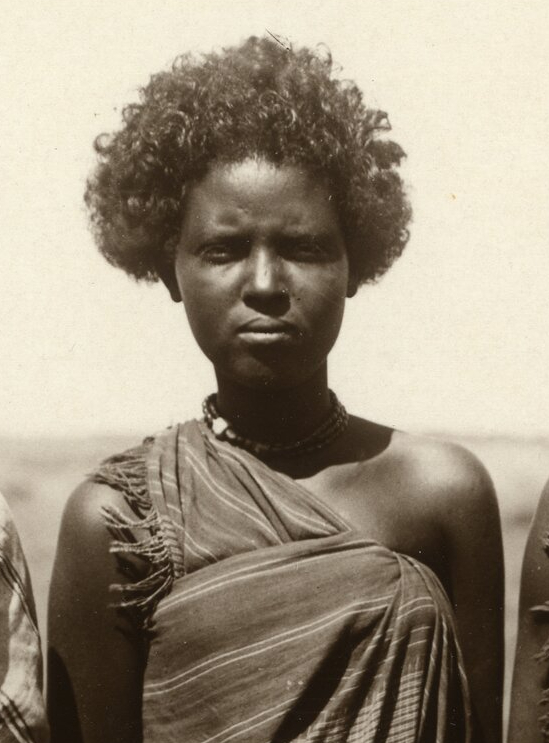
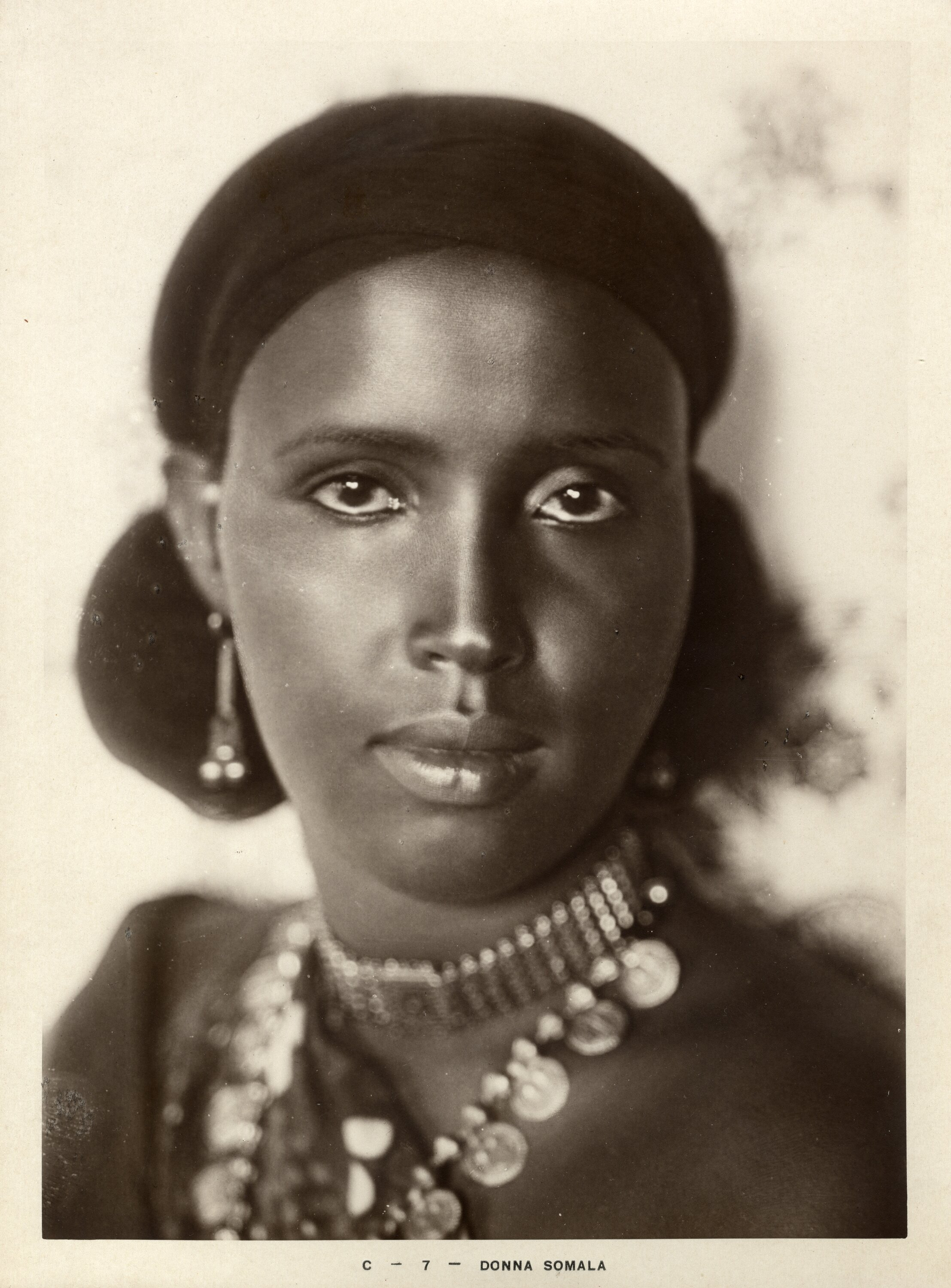
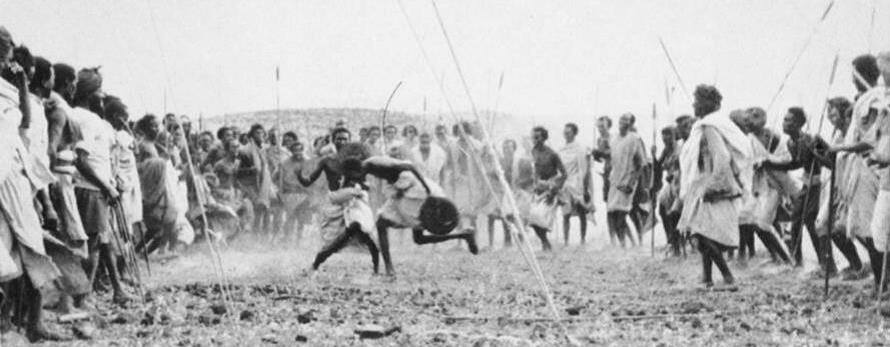
Top: Italian Somaliland era portraits of a Somali girl and a Somali woman in traditional jewelry (c. 1920s) Bottom: Somalis in mock combat (Istunka), 1936

To the extent that Italy held the territory by UN mandate, the trusteeship provisions gave the Somalis the opportunity to gain experience in political education and self-government. These were advantages that British Somaliland, which was to be incorporated into the new Somali Republic state, did not have. Although in the 1950s British colonial officials attempted, through various administrative development efforts, to make up for past neglect, the protectorate stagnated. The disparity between the two territories in economic development and political experience would cause serious difficulties when it came time to integrate the two parts.

Meanwhile, in 1948, under pressure from their World War II allies and to the dismay of the Somalis, the British ceded official control of the Haud (an important Somali grazing area that was brought under British protection via treaties with the Somalis in 1884 and 1886) and the Ogaden to Ethiopia, based on a treaty they signed in 1897 in which the British ceded Somali territory to the Ethiopian Emperor Menelik in exchange for his help against raids by Somali clans. Britain included the proviso that the Somali nomads would retain their autonomy, but Ethiopia immediately claimed sovereignty over them. This prompted an unsuccessful bid by Britain in 1956 to purchase back the Somali lands it had turned over. The British government also granted administration of the almost exclusively Somali-inhabited Northern Frontier District (NFD) to the Kenyan government despite an informal plebiscite demonstrating the overwhelming desire of the region's population to join the newly formed Somali Republic.

A referendum was held in neighboring French Somaliland in 1958, on the eve of Somalia's independence in 1960, to decide whether or not to join the Somali Republic or to remain with France. The referendum turned out in favour of a continued association with France, largely due to a combined yes vote by the sizable Afar ethnic group and resident Europeans. There was also widespread vote rigging, with the French expelling thousands of Somalis before the referendum reached the polls. The majority of those who voted no were Somalis who were strongly in favour of joining a united Somalia, as had been proposed by Mahmoud Harbi, Vice President of the Government Council. Harbi was killed in a plane crash two years later. Djibouti finally gained its independence from France in 1977, and Hassan Gouled Aptidon, a Somali who had campaigned for a yes vote in the referendum of 1958, eventually wound up as Djibouti's first president (1977–1991).

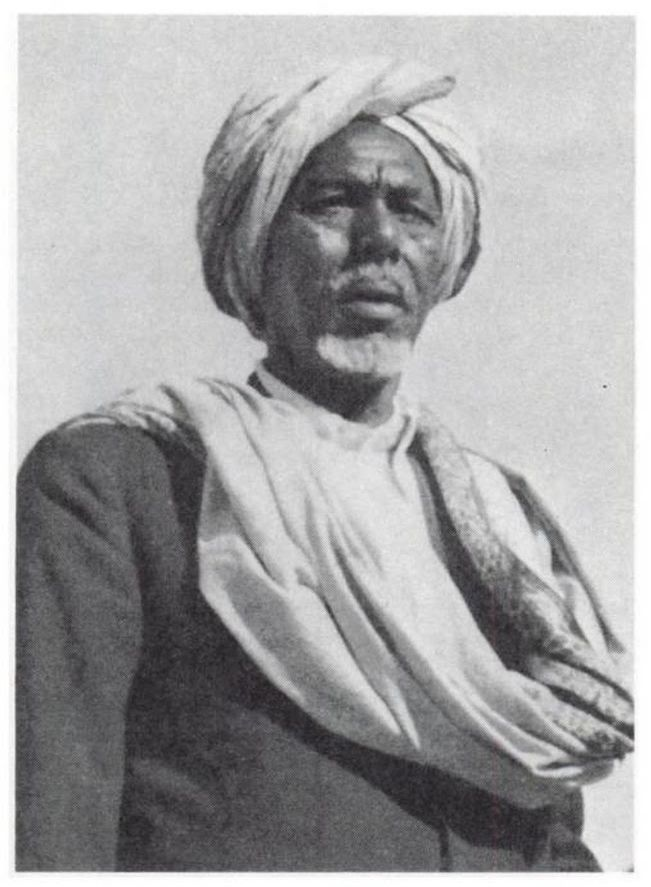
Sultan Abdillahi Deria, a prominent Grand Sultan of British Somaliland of the delegation sent from British Somaliland Protectorate to the British government in London to appeal for the return of Haud Reserve Area, a territory ceded by the British to Ethiopia in 1954

British Somaliland became independent on 26 June 1960 as the State of Somaliland, and the Trust Territory of Somalia (the former Italian Somalia) followed suit five days later. On 1 July 1960, the two territories united to form the Somali Republic, albeit within boundaries drawn up by Italy and Britain. A government was formed by Abdullahi Issa Mohamud and Muhammad Haji Ibrahim Egal other members of the trusteeship and protectorate governments, with Haji Bashir Ismail Yusuf as president of the Somali National Assembly, Aden Abdullah Osman Daar as the president of the Somali Republic and Abdirashid Ali Shermarke as Prime Minister (later to become president from 1967 to 1969). On 20 July 1961 and through a popular referendum, the people of Somalia ratified a new constitution, which was first drafted in 1960. The constitution was rejected by the people of Somaliland. In 1967, Muhammad Haji Ibrahim Egal became Prime Minister, a position to which he was appointed by Shermarke.

On 15 October 1969, while paying a visit to the northern town of Las Anod, Somalia's then President Abdirashid Ali Shermarke was shot dead by one of his own bodyguards. His assassination was quickly followed by a military coup d'état on 21 October 1969 (the day after his funeral), in which the Somali Army seized power without encountering armed opposition — essentially a bloodless takeover. The putsch was spearheaded by Major General Mohamed Siad Barre, who at the time commanded the army.

Alongside Barre, the Supreme Revolutionary Council (SRC) that assumed power after President Sharmarke's assassination was led by Lieutenant Colonel Salaad Gabeyre Kediye and Chief of Police Jama Korshel. The SRC subsequently renamed the country the Somali Democratic Republic, dissolved the parliament and the Supreme Court, and suspended the constitution.

The revolutionary army established large-scale public works programs and successfully implemented an urban and rural literacy campaign, which helped dramatically increase the literacy rate. In addition to a nationalization program of industry and land, the new regime's foreign policy placed an emphasis on Somalia's traditional and religious links with the Arab world, eventually joining the Arab League (AL) in 1974. That same year, Barre also served as chairman of the Organization of African Unity (OAU), the predecessor of the African Union (AU).

== Clan system ==
Somali clans are patrilineal kinship groups based on agnatic descent of the Somali people. Tradition and folklore connects the origin of the Somali population by language and way of life, and societal organisations, by customs, and by a feeling of belonging to a broader family among individuals from the Arabian Peninsula.

The Somali people are mainly divided among five patrilineal clans, the Hawiye, Darod, Isaaq, Rahanweyn and Dir. The average person is able to trace their ancestry generations back. Somali clans in contemporary times have an established official structure in the country's political system, acknowledged by a mathematical formula for equitably distributing seats between the clans in the Federal Parliament of Somalia. Minor Somali clans include Asharaf.

The clan represents the highest degree of familial affiliation. It holds territorial properties and is typically overseen by a Sultan. Clans possess ancestral lands, which are associated with the migratory patterns of the Somali people throughout their historical narrative. Each clan is administered by its designated leader and supported by its council of elders, with land being communally owned and overseen. Various Somali clans utilise distinct titles for their leaders, including Sultan, Emir, Imam, Ughaz, and Garaad. Clan leadership may be hereditary, or leaders may be elected by the council of elders composed of representatives from diverse clan lineages. The leaders of these clans fulfill both religious and political responsibilities.

Certain clans are traditionally classed as noble clans, referring to their pastoral lifestyle in contrast to the sedentary "Sab". The noble clans are the Dir, Darod, Hawiye and Isaaq. Out of these clans, Dir and Hawiye are regarded as descended from Samaale, the likely source of the ethnonym Somali (soomaali).The Hawiye are descended from Samaale through his grandson Ahmed Bin Abdulrahman Bin Uthman. Darod and Isaaq have separate agnatic traditions of descent from Abdirahman bin Isma'il al-Jabarti and Ishaaq bin Ahmed respectively. Sheikh Darod and Sheikh Ishaaq are asserted to have married women from the Dir clan, thus establishing matrilateral ties with the Samaale main stem. "Sab" is a term used to refer to the agricultural clans such as the Rahanweyn, in contrast to "Samaale".

The traditions of descent from noble elite forefathers who settled on the littoral are debated, although they are based on early Arab documents and Somali folklore. The tombs of the founders of Darod, Dir, Isaaq as well as the Abgaal subclan of Hawiye are all located in northern Somalia. Tradition holds this area as the ancestral homeland of the Somali people.

== Religion ==
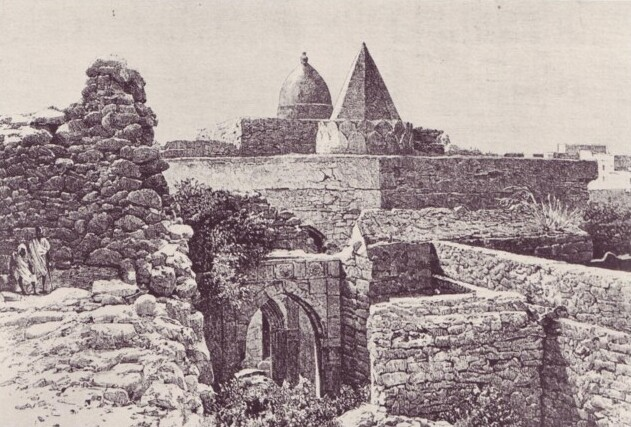
13th century Fakr ad-Din mosque built by Fakr ad-Din, the first Sultan of the Mogadishu Sultanate

With very few exceptions, Somalis are entirely Muslims, the vast majority belonging to the Sunni branch of Islam and the Shafi'i school of Islamic jurisprudence. There are two theories about when Somalis began adopting Islam. One states that the religion entered the region very early on, as a group of persecuted Muslims had, at Prophet Muhummad's urging, sought refuge across the Red Sea in the Horn of Africa. Islam may thus have been introduced into Somalia well before the faith even took root in its place of origin. An alternate theory states that Islam was brought to the coastal settlements of Somalia between the 7th and the 10th century by seafaring Arab and Persian merchants.

At present, scholarly dates for the Islamicization of the country are uncertain and may be as late as the eleventh and twelfth centuries, though others suggest a possibly earlier date. Islam entered the region very early on, shortly after the hijra. The two-mihrab Masjid al-Qiblatayn dates to the 7th century, and is the oldest mosque in the country. In the late 9th century, Al-Yaqubi wrote that Muslims were living along the northern Somali seaboard.

The constitution of Somalia defines Islam as the state religion of the Federal Republic of Somalia, and Islamic sharia law as the basic source for national legislation. It also stipulates that no law that is inconsistent with the basic tenets of Shari'a can be enacted. There are some Somalis who genuinely believe with great pride that they are of Arabian ancestry, and trace their stirp to the Islamic prophet Muhammad's lineage of Quraysh and those of his companions. Although they do not consider themselves culturally Arabs, except for the shared religion, their presumed noble Arabian origins genealogically unite them. The purpose behind claiming genealogical traditions of descent from the Arabian Peninsula is used to reinforce one's lineage and the various associated patriarchs with the spread of Islam.

According to data from the Pew Research Center, the creed breakdown of Muslims in the Somali-majority Djibouti is as follows: 77% adhere to Sunnism, 8% are non-denominational Muslim, 2% are Shia and 13% declined to answer, and a further report inclusive of the Somali Region in Ethiopia stipulating 2% adherence to a minority sect (e.g. Ibadism, Quranism etc.). In the neighboring country of Somalia, 99.8% of the population is Muslim according to the Pew Research Center. The majority belong to the Sunni branch of Islam and the Shafi'i school of Islamic jurisprudence. Sufism, the mystical sect of Islam, is also well established, with many local jama'a (zawiya) or congregations of the various tariiqa or Sufi orders.

== Languages ==
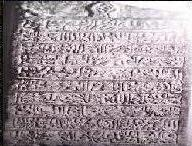
Old Somali stone tablet: After Somali had lost its ancient writing script, Somali scholars over the following centuries developed a writing system known as Wadaad writing to transcribe the language

The Somali language (Af-Soomaali) is a member of the Cushitic branch of the Afroasiatic family. Its nearest relatives are the Afar and Saho languages. Somali is the best documented of the Cushitic languages with academic studies dating from the 19th century.

Speech sample in Standard Somali

The exact number of speakers of Somali is unknown. One source estimates that there are 16.3 million speakers of Somali within Somalia and 25.8 million speakers globally. Recent estimates had approximately 24 million speakers of Somali, spread in Greater Somalia of which around 17 million resided in Somalia. The Somali language is spoken by ethnic Somalis in Greater Somalia and the Somali diaspora.

Somali dialects are divided into three main groups: Northern, Benadiri, and Maay. Northern Somali (or Northern-Central Somali) forms the basis for Standard Somali. Benadiri (also known as Coastal Somali) is spoken on the Benadir coast from Adale to south of Merca, including Mogadishu, as well as in the immediate hinterland. The coastal dialects have additional phonemes which do not exist in Standard Somali. Maay is principally spoken by the Digil and Mirifle (Rahanweyn) clans in the southwestern areas of Somalia.

A number of writing systems have been used over the years for transcribing the Somali language. Of these, the Somali Latin alphabet is the most widely used, and has been the official writing script in Somalia since the government of former President of Somalia Mohamed Siad Barre formally introduced it in October 1972. The script was developed by the Somali linguist Shire Jama Ahmed specifically for the Somali language. It uses all letters of the Latin alphabet, except p, v, and z. Besides the Latin script, other orthographies that have been used for centuries for writing Somali include the long-established Arabic script and Wadaad writing. Other writing systems developed in the twentieth century including the Osmanya, Borama and Kaddare scripts, which were invented by Osman Yusuf Kenadid, Abdurahman Sheikh Nuur and Hussein Sheikh Ahmed Kaddare respectively.

In addition to Somali, Arabic, which is also an Afro-Asiatic tongue, is an official national language in Somalia and Djibouti. Many Somalis speak it due to millennia-old ties with the Arab world, the far-reaching influence of the Arabic media, and religious education. Somalia and Djibouti are also both members of the Arab League.

== Culture ==
Somali culture is a diverse tradition, an amalgamation of traditions developed independently and through interaction with neighboring and far away civilizations, such as other parts of Northeast Africa, the Arabian Peninsula, India and Southeast Asia, shaped by centuries of nomadic life, Islamic scholarship, and maritime trade. It encompasses a strong oral heritage, particularly in poetry, which plays a central role in social and political life. Islam is deeply integrated into Somali customs, law, and daily practice. Somali society is traditionally clan-based, with a strong emphasis on hospitality, kinship, and communal responsibility. Artistic expression appears in various forms including music, dance, visual arts, and decorative crafts, often reflecting both Islamic and indigenous influences.

The cultural diffusion of Somali commercial enterprise can be detected in its cuisine, which contains Southeast Asian, Persian and Arab influences. Due to the Somali people's passionate love for and facility with poetry, Somalia has often been referred to by scholars as a "Nation of Poets" and a "Nation of Bards".

=== Music ===
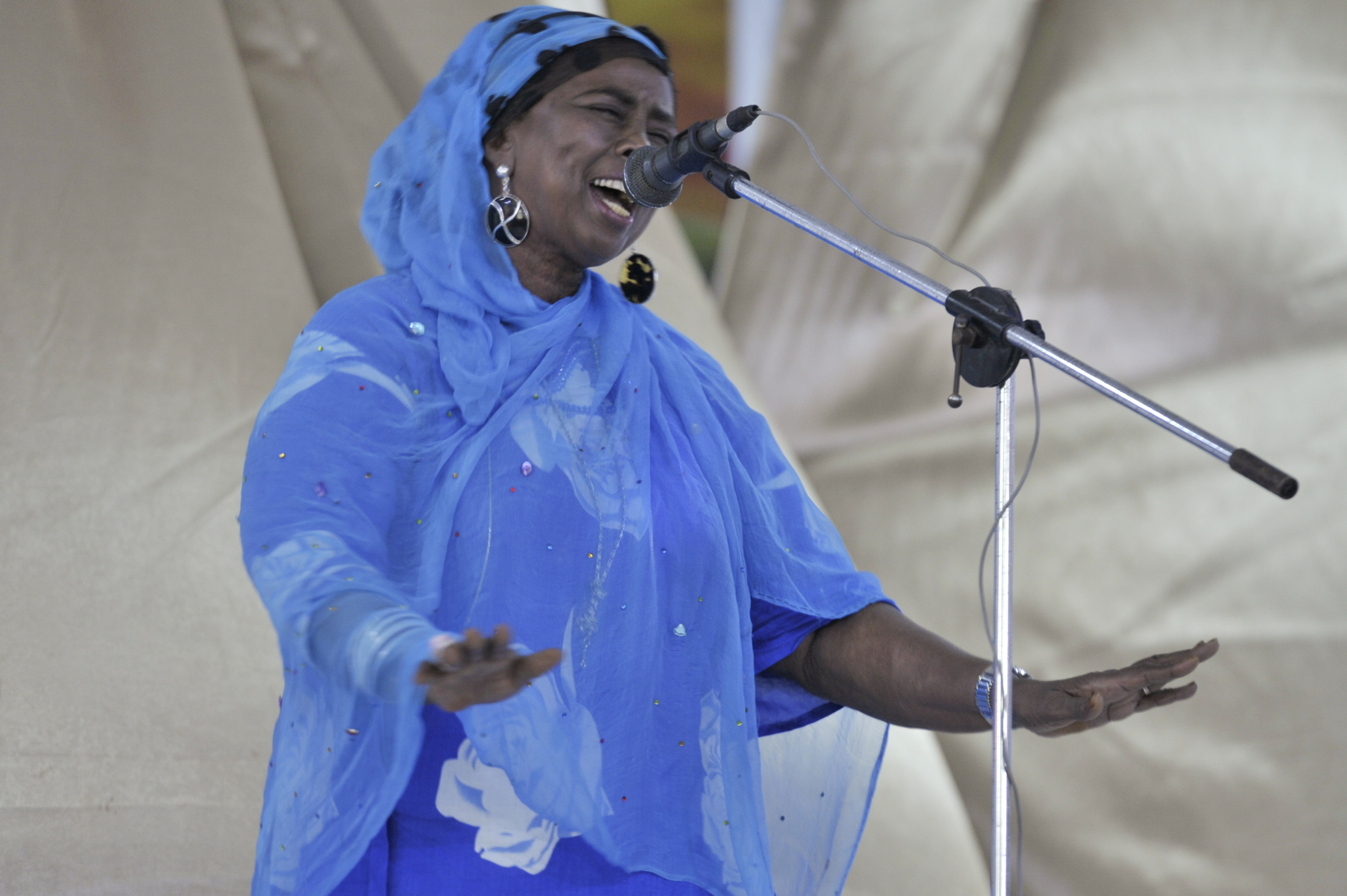
Prominent Somali singer Hibo Nura, who began her career in 1968, performs in Mogadishu, April 2014

Somali music is a traditional and contemporary art form that plays an important role in cultural expression and social communication. Most Somali songs are pentatonic. That is, they only use five pitches per octave in contrast to a heptatonic (seven note) scale, such as the major scale. At first listen, Somali music might be mistaken for the sounds of nearby regions such as Ethiopia, Sudan or Arabia, it is distinguished by its unique melodic structures and performance practices. Somali songs are usually the product of collaboration between lyricists (midho), songwriters (laxan) and singers (Codka or "voice"). Traditional music often features vocal performances accompanied by instruments such as the oud, kaban (a type of lute), and percussion. In pastoral and nomadic contexts, music functions as a medium for storytelling, oral history, and communal events. Religious music, particularly devotional chants, is also present within the broader musical tradition. In the mid-20th century, Somali music incorporated external influences and expanded through state-supported cultural initiatives and media broadcasts.

=== Cinema and theatre ===
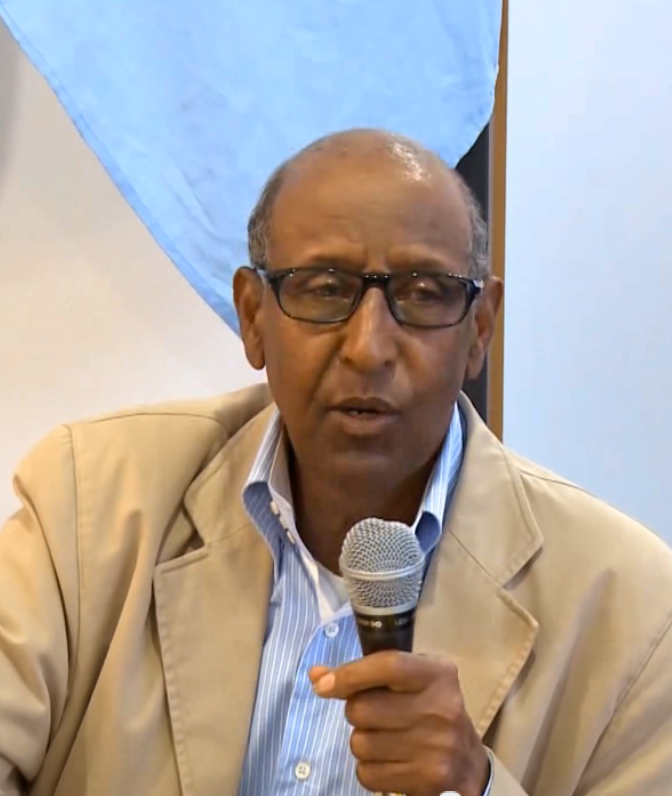
Somali film producer and director Ali Said Hassan

Somali cinema developed out of the country's strong oral storytelling traditions, with the first feature-length films and film festivals appearing in the early 1960s, soon after Somalia gained independence. The establishment of the Somali Film Agency (SFA) in 1975 marked a key turning point, leading to a period of rapid growth in the national film sector. This era saw the emergence of influential figures such as Hassan Sheikh Mumin, a prominent playwright and composer whose play Shabeel Naagood (1965) became a cornerstone of Somali literature and theater. The work, later translated into English as Leopard Among the Women, explores themes such as gender roles, education, and societal change. Although the issues it describes were later to some degree redressed, the work remains a mainstay of Somali literature. Mumin composed both the play itself and the music used in it. The piece is regularly featured in various school curricula, including Oxford University, which first published the English translation under its press house. In the 1970s and early 1980s, musical dramas known as riwaayado dominated the cinematic landscape, forming a bridge between live performance and film. Filmmakers such as Ali Said Hassan and Said Salah Ahmed contributed to the production of epic and historical films, including The Somali Darwish, a major work on the Dervish movement. Technological developments and expanding television access facilitated broader distribution of Somali films during this time. In the 1990s and 2000s, a new wave of more entertainment-oriented movies emerged. Referred to as Somaliwood, this upstart, youth-based cinematic movement has energized the Somali film industry and in the process introduced innovative storylines, marketing strategies and production techniques. The young directors Abdisalam Aato of Olol Films and Abdi Malik Isak are at the forefront of this quiet revolution.

=== Art ===
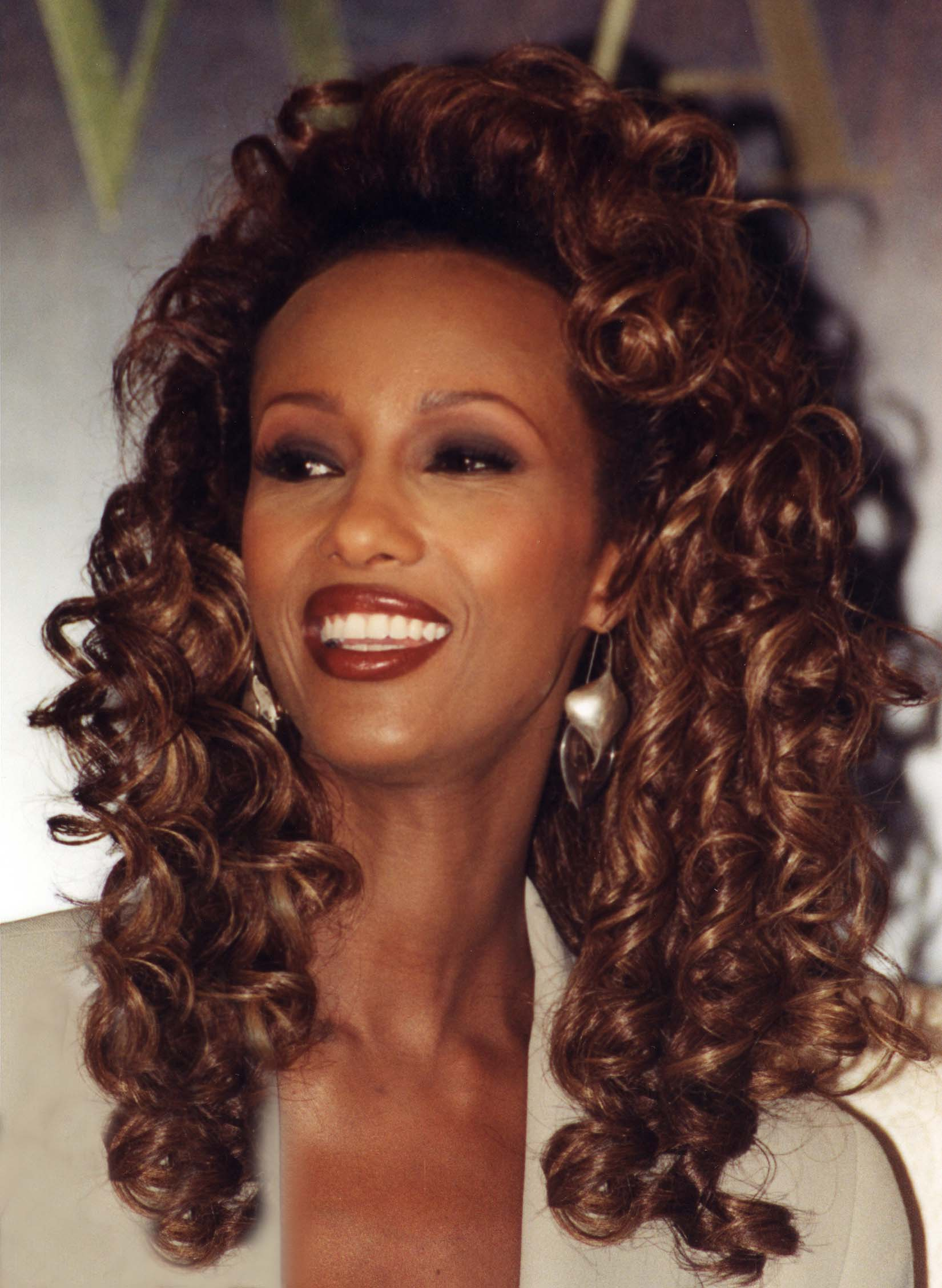
Iman (pictured in 1994) is a Somali-American who rose to fame in the late 1970s as the first Somali supermodel in Western high fashion

Traditional Somali art includes pottery, jewelry, and wood carving, with men historically responsible for carving and women for textile production. In the medieval period, wealthy urban patrons often commissioned local artisans to decorate interiors with intricate wood and marble carvings, especially within homes, mihrabs, and pillars of ancient Somali mosques, which frequently featured elaborate geometric and floral motifs. Among nomadic communities, artistic woodwork was common in everyday objects such as spoons, combs, and bowls, as well as in more complex constructions like the portable aqal house. In recent decades, traditional carving techniques have been increasingly supplemented by workshop-based production using electrical machinery.

Additionally, henna is particularly prominent in festive and ceremonial contexts such as Eid and weddings. Somali women apply henna to their hands, feet, and arms (often in floral and geometric patterns similar to those seen in the Arabian peninsula) and use kohl (kuul) around the eyes for decorative purposes. Usage of the eye cosmetic in the Horn region is believed to date to the ancient Land of Punt.

=== Clothing ===
Somali clothing reflects the nation's deep-rooted Islamic faith, nomadic heritage, and coastal trade influences. Traditional Somali attire is designed for modesty, comfort in a hot climate, and social or religious significance.

==== Men ====
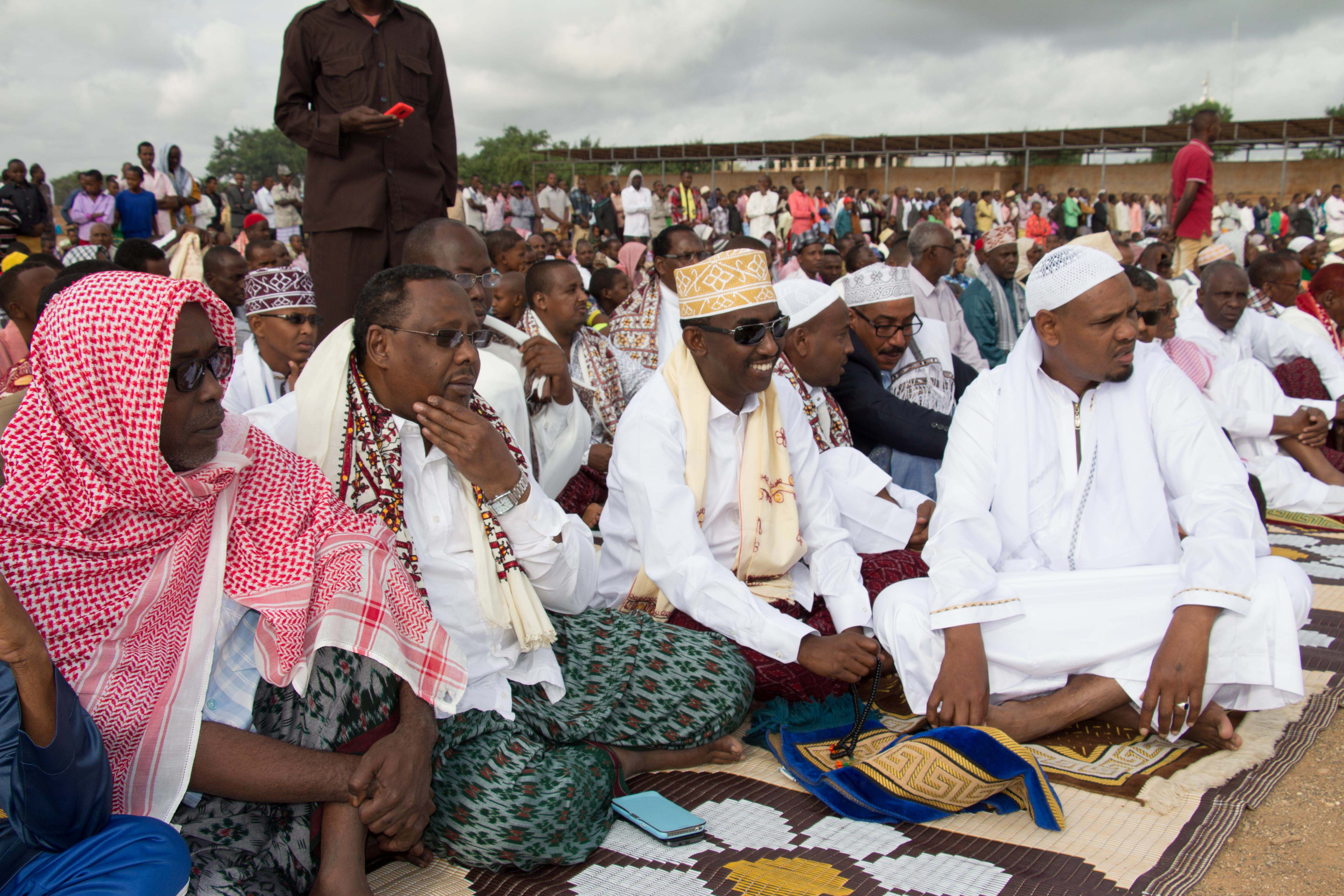
Somali men wearing various traditional attire in 2016

- Macawis, a sarong-like garment wrapped around the waist, often worn with a plain or embroidered shirt. It is the most common traditional attire for Somali men in daily life.
- Khamiis (Thobe), A long, loose-fitting robe similar to the Arab thobe, typically white or light-colored, worn for prayer and formal events.
- Jubbad, A ceremonial outer robe, similar to the Bisht, richly decorated with embroidery and tassels. Worn by religious figures, elders, and traditional leaders, it symbolizes authority and respect.
- Koofiyad, a round, embroidered cap, sometimes topped with a turban (imaama).

==== Women ====
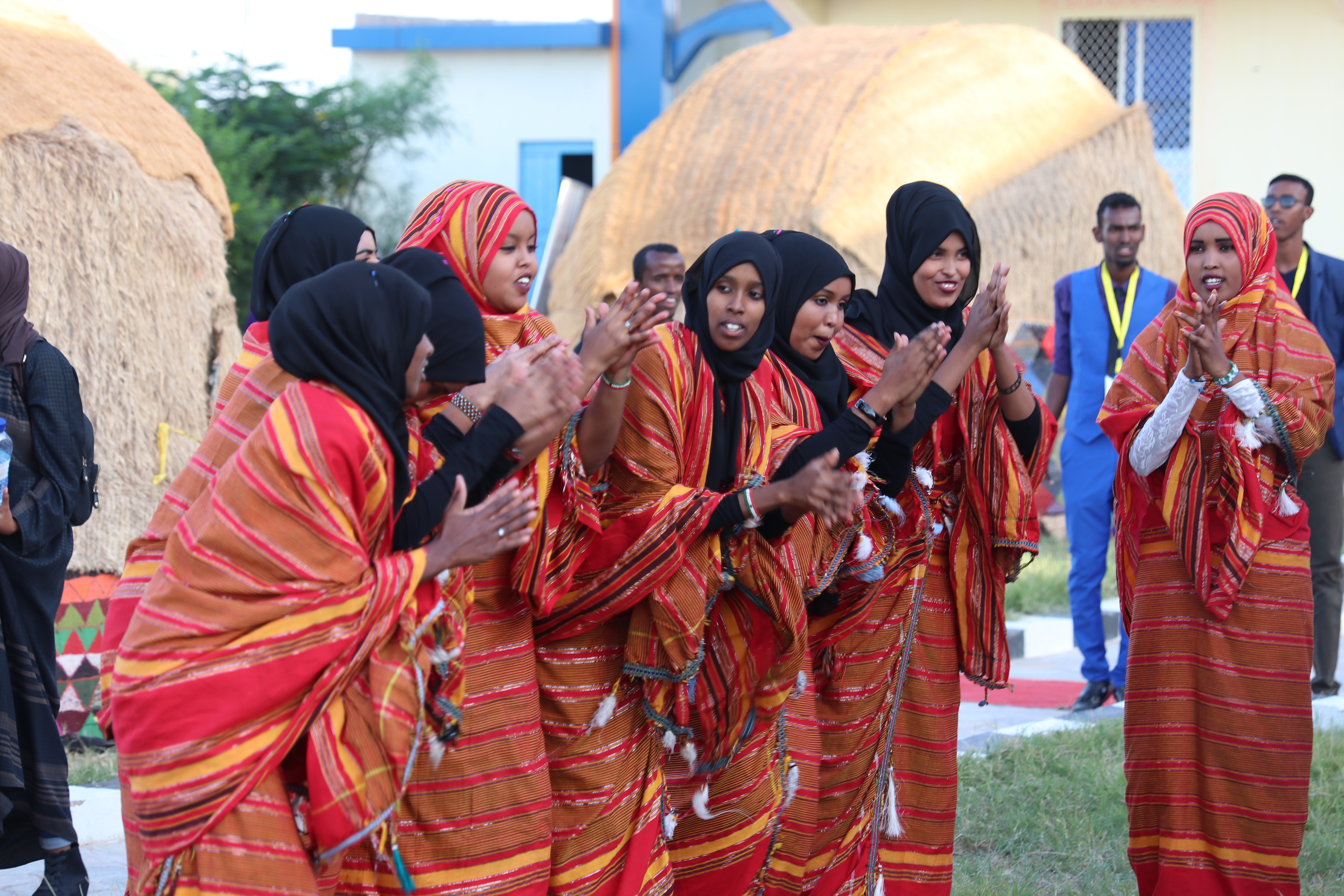
Somali university students performing a traditional dance in cultural attire in 2019

- Dirac, a light, flowing dress made of chiffon or cotton, worn over an underskirt (gorgorad) and a blouse. It is often worn for special occasions, weddings, or religious festivals. It is a long, light, diaphanous voile dress made of silk, chiffon, taffeta or saree fabric. The dirac is usually sparkly and very colorful, the most popular styles being those with gilded borders or threads.
- Guntiino, a traditional garment wrapped around the body and tied at the shoulders, often worn by rural women. It is one of the oldest forms of Somali dress. The cloth is usually made out of alindi, which is a textile that is common in the Horn region and some parts of North Africa.
- Hijab and Shayla, a Somali women typically wear the hijab (headscarf), often paired with a long shawl (shayla) referred to as shaash or jilbab for added modesty. Traditional Arabian garb, such as the jilbab and abaya, is also commonly worn. * Garbasaar, a large, colorful shawl used to wrap the upper body or head, often used for decoration or to shield from the sun.Garbasaar, a large, colorful shawl used to wrap the upper body or head, often used for decoration or to shield from the sun.
- Jewelry, Somali women have a long tradition of wearing gold jewelry, particularly bangles. During weddings, the bride is frequently adorned in gold. Many Somali women by tradition also wear gold necklaces and anklets.

=== Sports ===
Mo Farah (pictured in 2017), a British-Somali distance runner, four-time Olympic Gold medallist and six-time World champion, holding the record for the most global track distance gold medals

Sports play an important role in Somali society, with football being the most popular and widely followed sport. The main domestic competitions include the Somalia League and Somalia Cup, while the national team, known as the Ocean Stars, represents the country in international tournaments. The team is multi ethnic. Basketball is also played in the country. The FIBA Africa Championship 1981 was hosted in Mogadishu from 15 to 23 December 1981, during which the national basketball team received the bronze medal. The squad also takes part in the basketball event at the Pan Arab Games. Other team sports include badminton, baseball, table tennis, and volleyball.

In individual sports, Somali athletes have participated in a range of disciplines, including judo, boxing, athletics, weightlifting, swimming, rowing, fencing, and wrestling. In martial arts, Faisal Jeylani Aweys and Mohamed Deq Abdulle achieved notable success by winning silver and fourth place, respectively, at the 2013 Open World Taekwondo Challenge Cup. Mohamed Jama has earned international recognition by securing both world and European titles in K1 and Thai Boxing. Somali athletes have gained international prominence in long-distance running, with figures such as Mo Farah, Abdi Bile and Mohammed Ahmed achieving global success.

=== Cuisine ===
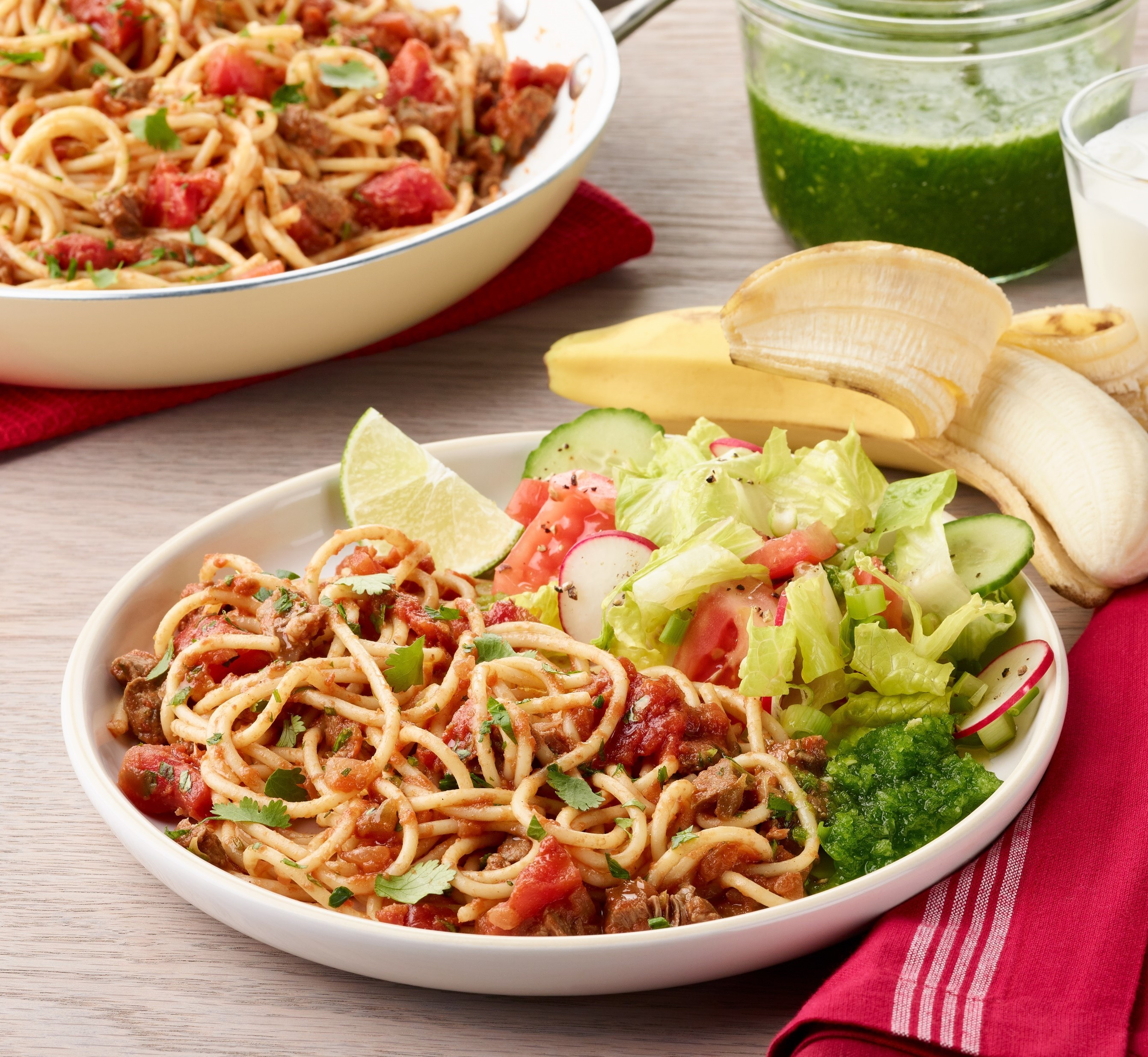
Baasto (Pasta), popular in the Northwest and Southern regions of Somalia, introduced during the Italian colonial period

Somali cuisine reflects a diverse mix of different culinary influences. Drawing from Arab, Indian, and Italian flavours, it is shaped by Somalia's history of trade and commerce. The aftermath of Italian colonial rule in Somalia left a culinary influence that is seen in the widespread adoption of pasta (baasto), usually served with a sauce (suugo), and lasagne.

The foundation of Somali dishes encompasses staples like rice and pasta, paired with a type of meat such as lamb, beef, or chicken. Somali culinary traditions include camel meat and milk, which are considered delicacies and important components in the diets of pastoralists. Coastal communities also incorporate seafood into their meals. Aromatic spices such as cumin, cardamom, and coriander are frequently utilized to add flavor to dishes.

Somali cuisine includes an assortment of stews, traditional flatbreads, and pastries. This includes Canjeero/Lahooh, a variation of fermented pancake-like flatbread that is savored in Somalia and in neighbouring countries like Ethiopia, Eritrea, and Yemen.

Somali rice, the usual staple for dinner or lunch, is typically seasoned and mixed with various ingredients such as meat, vegetables, and, raisins. It is not uncommon for this dish to be presented in a visually appealing manner by incorporating multiple colors. The dish may be artificially tinted with shades of yellow or orange using saffron and other spices to enhance its aesthetic appeal.

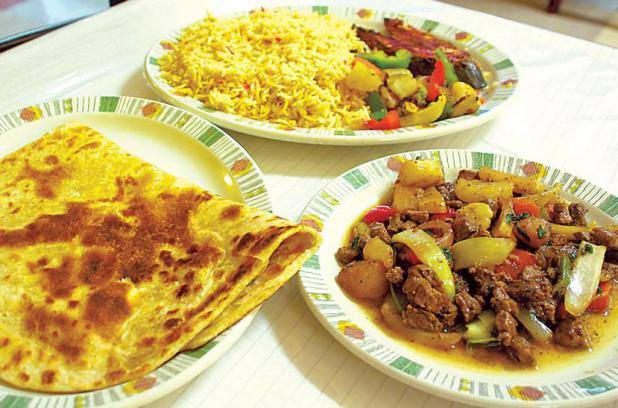
Somali rice (bariis) and fish (kalluun), Liver (beer) with vegetable also (Sabaayad) pancakes

Tea and coffee are also really popular. Somalis were among the early adopters of coffee consumption and the first individuals documented to have enjoyed this drink. Additionally, Somali merchants were some of the first to export coffee beans. The methods for preparing Somali coffee, known locally as 'Qahwo', and tea ('Shah'), involves mixing various spices together to enhance their flavor profile. Bun, which consists of coffee beans fried in ghee and infused with spices, is traditionally served during religious or social gatherings.

'Xalwo', which is closely associated with 'Halva', is a smooth jelly-like treat that is made with a mixture of spices, seeds, nuts, and caramelized sugar. This confection is commonly served together with biscuits and Somali tea. After meals, homes are traditionally perfumed using frankincense or incense (unsi), which is prepared inside an incense burner referred to as a dabqaad.

=== Literature ===
Somali literature encompasses a longstanding oral and written tradition, with poetry serving as a central medium for cultural expression, historical transmission, and social discourse. Somali scholars have for centuries contributed to Islamic literature, producing works in fields such as poetry and Hadith. Some famous poets include Sayyid Moḥammad Abdallah Hassan, Ali Bu'ul, Elmi Boodhari, and Hadrawi. Early Somali writing was primarily in Arabic script and Wadaad writing, a system used by religious scholars and their associates. Although Arabic was the preferred language for formal scholarship, Somali-language manuscripts were also produced, particularly in the form of religious poetry (Qasida), recitations, and chants. The rest of the historical literature in Somali largely consists of translations from Arabic. Among these texts are the Somali poems by Sheikh Uways and Sheikh Ismaaciil Faarah. The rest of the existing historical literature in Somali principally consists of translations of documents from Arabic.

This Qasida by Uways Al-Barawi called the Hadiyat al-ʿAnam ila Qabr al-Nabi (Guidance of Humanity to the Tomb of the Prophet) extols Muhammad.

إذا ماشئت تيسير المراد فصل على رسولك خير هادى
وقل مستنجدا في كل ناد صلاة الله مانادى المنادى
على المختار مولانا الحماد
حبيب الله افضل من ترقى وقبره فاق كرسيا ومرقى
وكل مواضع الخيرات صدقا يفوح المسك والريحان حقا
لقبر محمد نور الفؤاد
تنور جميع ارجاء الحبيب - يرى الانوار قاصده بطيب
ويلقاه البعيد مع القريب - يعم الال جيران الحبيب
بعرف عبيره اهل البلاد

— Uways Al Barawi Hadiyat al-ʿAnam ila Qabr al-Nabi
Translation:

Whenever you wish to make easy your objective then give a prayer to your messenger [Muhammad] the best of Guides
And say, seeking aid in every circle blessings of Allah, as the crier cries on the Chosen, our master the praised

Beloved of Allah preferred of those who ascended, his tomb is above any throne or high place
As in every pious place, sincerely musk and spices give fragrances, truly to the tomb of Muhammad light of the heart

Every aspect of the Habib gives light the one who seeks him, sees the lights with goodness
The distances meets it along with the near it will encompass the family, the neighbors of the beloved
As well as the people of the community, with knowledge of his fragrance

=== Law ===
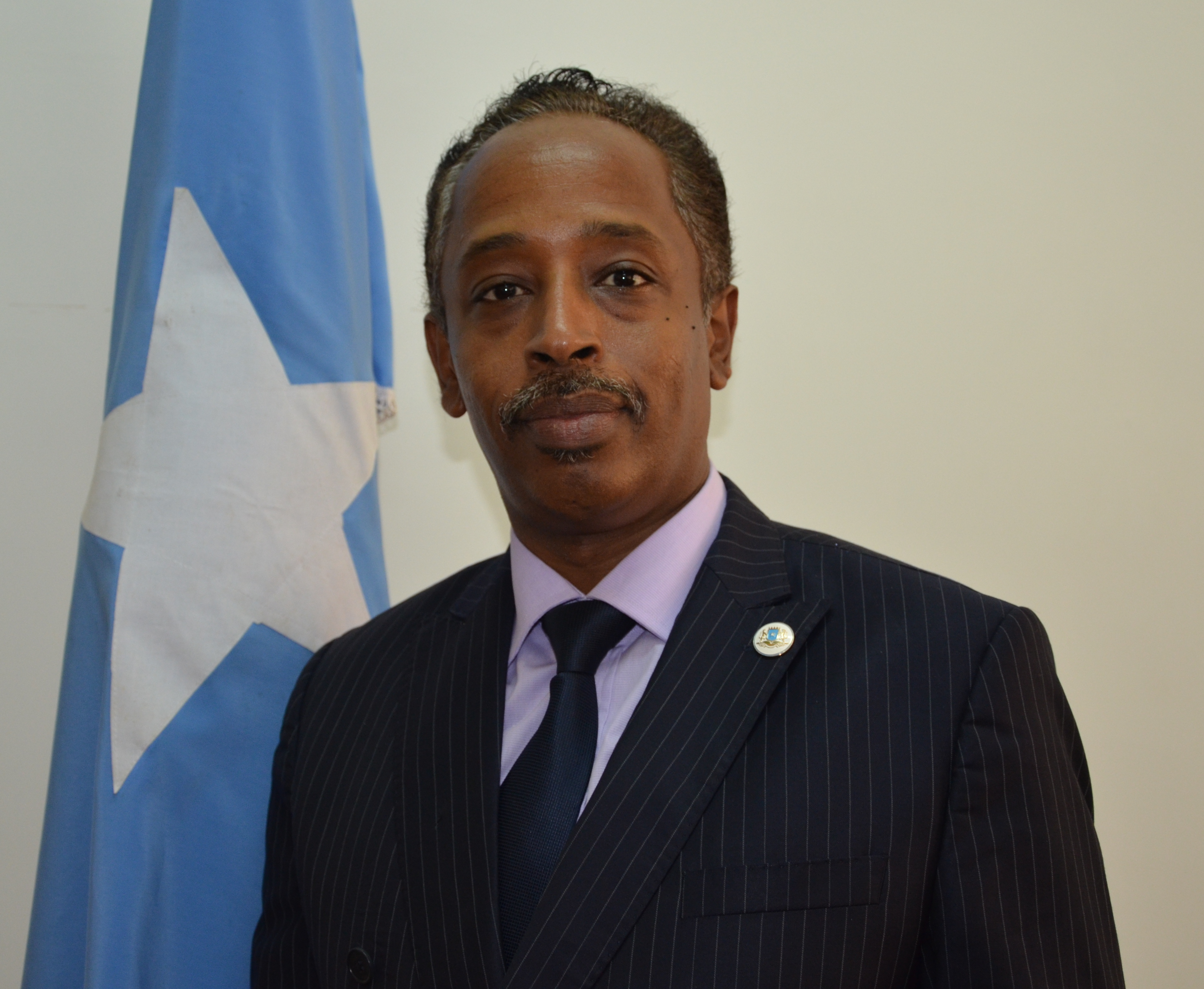
Mahad Abdalle Awad, a politician who served as the Second Deputy Speaker for the Federal Parliament of Somalia from 2012 to 2022

Somalis for centuries have practiced a form of customary law, which they call xeer. Xeer is a polycentric legal system where there is no monopolistic agent that determines what the law should be or how it should be interpreted. It is assumed to have developed exclusively in the Horn of Africa since approximately the 7th century. Given the dearth of loan words from foreign languages within the xeer's nomenclature, the customary law appears to have evolved in situ.

Xeer is defined by a few fundamental tenets that are immutable and which closely approximate the principle of jus cogens in international law: payment of blood money (locally referred to as diya or mag), assuring good inter-clan relations by treating women justly, negotiating with "peace emissaries" in good faith, and sparing the lives of socially protected groups (e.g. children, women, the pious, poets and guests), family obligations such as the payment of dowry, and sanctions for eloping, rules pertaining to the management of resources such as the use of pasture land, water, and other natural resources, providing financial support to married female relatives and newlyweds, donating livestock and other assets to the poor. The Xeer legal system also requires a certain amount of specialization of different functions within the legal framework. Thus, one can find odayal (judges), xeer boggeyaal (jurists), guurtiyaal (detectives), garxajiyaal (attorneys), murkhaatiyal (witnesses) and waranle (police officers) to enforce the law.

== Architecture ==
Somali architecture is a rich and diverse tradition of engineering and designing. It involves multiple different construction types, such as stone cities, castles, citadels, fortresses, mosques, mausoleums, towers, tombs, tumuli, cairns, megaliths, menhirs, stelae, dolmens, stone circles, monuments, temples, enclosures, cisterns, aqueducts, and lighthouses. Spanning the ancient, medieval and early modern periods in Greater Somalia, it also includes the fusion of Somali architecture with Western designs in contemporary times.

In ancient Somalia, pyramidical structures known in Somali as taalo were a popular burial style. Hundreds of these dry stone monuments are found around the country today. Houses were built of dressed stone similar to the ones in Ancient Egypt. There are also examples of courtyards and large stone walls enclosing settlements, such as the Wargaade Wall.

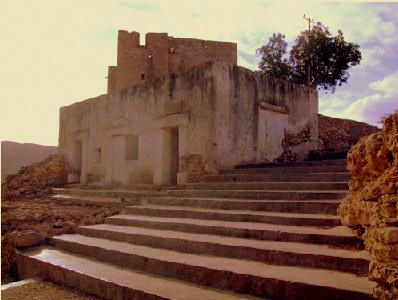
Dervish movement fort in Eyl

The peaceful introduction of Islam in the early medieval era of Somalia's history brought Islamic architectural influences from Arabia and Persia. This had the effect of stimulating a shift in construction from drystone and other related materials to coral stone, sundried bricks, and the widespread use of limestone in Somali architecture. Many of the new architectural designs, such as mosques, were built on the ruins of older structures. This practice would continue over and over again throughout the following centuries.

== Ethnic flag ==
The Somali flag is an ethnic flag conceived to represent ethnic Somalis. It was created in 1954 by the Somali scholar Mohammed Awale Liban, after he had been selected by the labour trade union of the Trust Territory of Somalia to come up with a design. Upon independence in 1960, the flag was adopted as the national flag of the nascent Somali Republic. The five-pointed Star of Unity in the flag's center represents the Somali ethnic group inhabiting the five territories in Greater Somalia.

== Geographic distribution ==
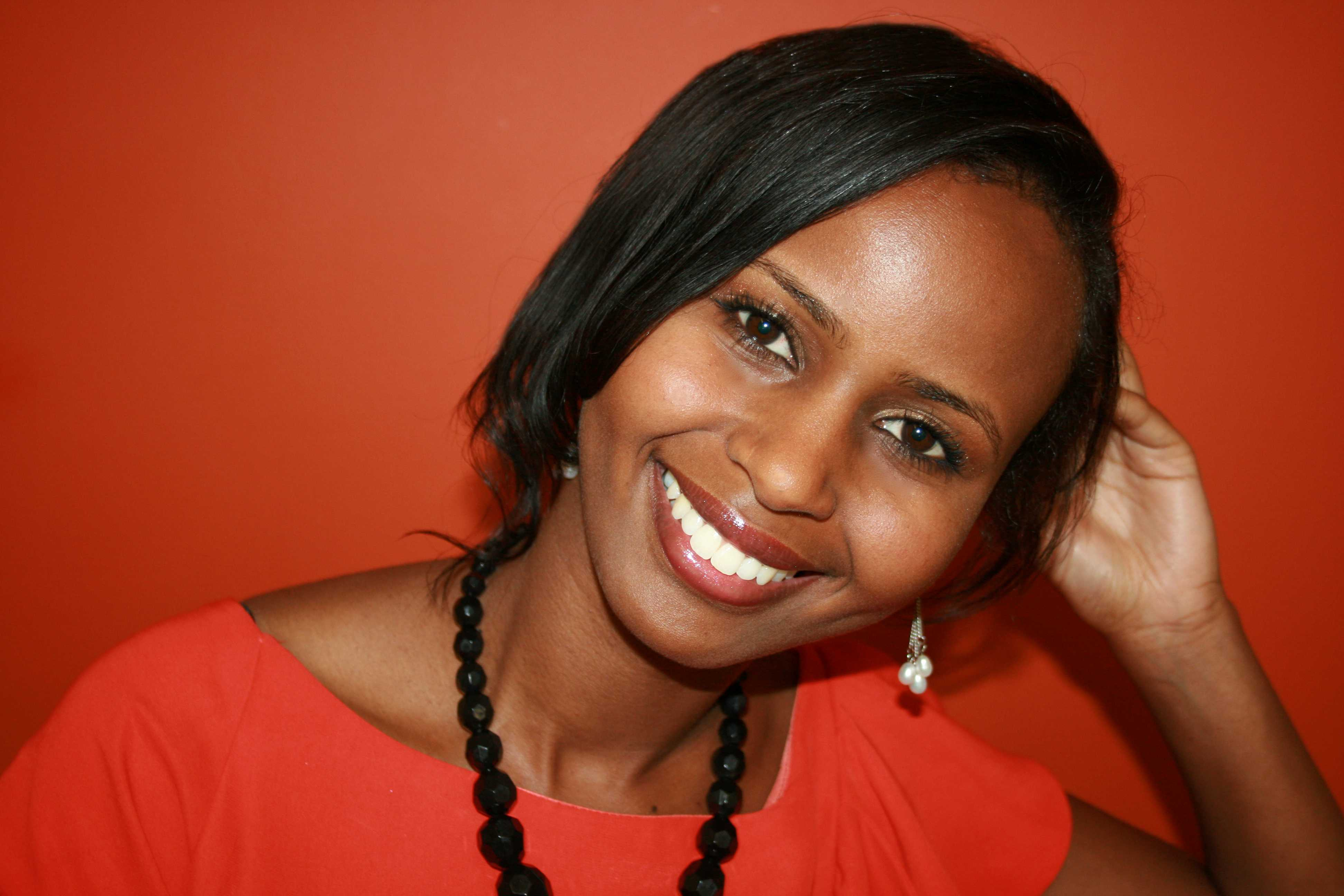
Nadifa Mohamed, a British-Somali novelist, pictured in 2010

The Somali people primarily inhabit the Horn of Africa, in a region often referred to as Greater Somalia. This area encompasses the modern-day nation of Somalia as well as parts of Djibouti, eastern Ethiopia (the Somali Region), and northeastern Kenya. These territories are historically and culturally linked through shared language, religion, and clan affiliations. The concept of Greater Somalia reflects a longstanding national identity that predates colonial borders. Following the outbreak of the Somali civil war in the early 1990s, significant numbers of Somalis were displaced, leading to the emergence of a widespread global diaspora. Today, substantial Somali communities are found in countries such as the United Arab Emirates, Saudi Arabia, Yemen United States, the United Kingdom, Canada, Sweden, Norway, and the Netherlands among others, where they have established diaspora communities while maintaining strong transnational ties to their homeland. UN migration estimates of the international migrant stock 2015 suggest that 1,998,764 people from Somalia were living abroad.

== Genetics ==
=== Uniparental lineages ===
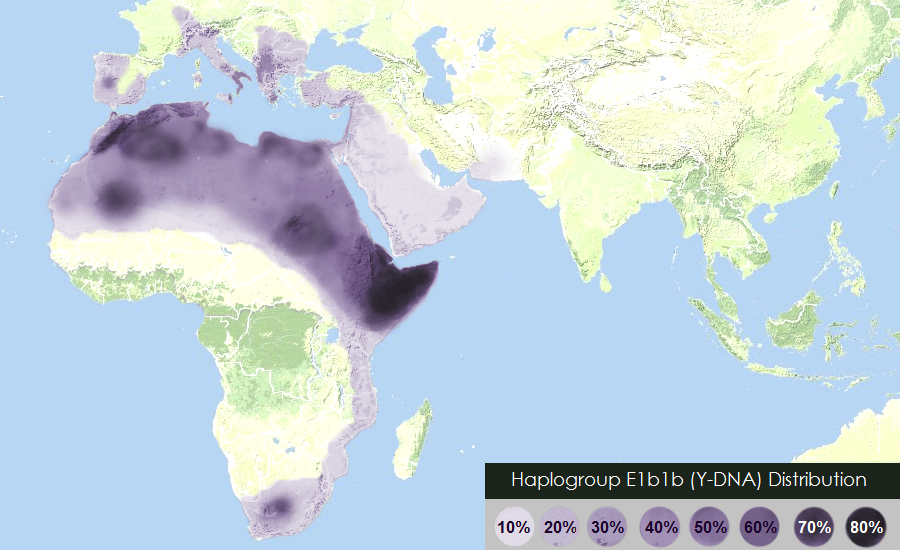
E1b1b is the most common paternal haplogroup across Africa, with modern genetic studies rooting the origin of the E haplogroup in East Africa

According to Y chromosome studies by Sanchez et al. (2005), Cruciani et al. (2004, 2007), the Somalis are paternally closely related to other Afro-Asiatic-speaking groups in Northeast Africa. Besides comprising the majority of the Y-DNA in Somalis, the E1b1b (formerly E3b) haplogroup also makes up a significant proportion of the paternal DNA of Ethiopians, Sudanese, Egyptians, Berbers, North African Arabs, as well as many Mediterranean populations. Sanchez et al. (2005) observed the E-M78 subclade of E1b1b1a in about 70.6% of their Somali male samples. According to Cruciani et al. (2007), the presence of this sub-haplogroup in the Horn region may represent the traces of an ancient migration from Egypt/Libya. (Note: Cruciani et al. 2007 use the term Northeastern Africa to refer to Egypt and Libya, as shown in Table 1 of the study. Prior to Cruciani et al. 2007, Semino et al. 2004 East Africa as a possible place of origin of E-M78, based upon Ethiopian testing. This was because of the high frequency and diversity of E-M78 lineages in the region of Ethiopia. However, Cruciani et al. 2007 were able to study more data, including populations from North Africa who were not represented in the Semino et al. 2004 study, and found evidence that the E-M78 lineages which make up a significant proportion of some populations in that region, were relatively young branches (see E-V32 below). They therefore concluded that "Northeast Africa" was the likely place of origin of E-M78 based on "the peripheral geographic distribution of the most derived subhaplogroups with respect to northeastern Africa, as well as the results of quantitative analysis of UEP and microsatellite diversity". So according to Cruciani et al. 2007 E-M35, the parent clade of E-M78, originated in East Africa, subsequently spread to Northeast Africa, and then there was a "back migration" of E-M215 chromosomes that had acquired the E-M78 mutation. Cruciani et al. 2007 therefore note this as evidence for "a corridor for bidirectional migrations" between Northeast Africa (Egypt and Libya in their data) on the one hand and East Africa on the other. The authors believe there were "at least 2 episodes between 23.9–17.3 ky and 18.0–5.9 ky ago".)

After haplogroup E1b1b, the second most frequently occurring Y-DNA haplogroup among Somalis is the West Asian haplogroup T (M184). The clade is observed in more than 10% of Somali males generally, with a peak frequency amongst the Somali Dir clan members in Djibouti (100%) and Somalis in Dire Dawa (82.4%), a city with a majority Dir population. Haplogroup T, like haplogroup E1b1b, is also typically found among other populations of Northeast Africa, the Maghreb, the Near East and the Mediterranean.

In Somalis, the Time to Most Recent Common Ancestor (TMRCA) was estimated to be 4000–5000 years (2,500 BCE) for the haplogroup E-M78 cluster γ and 2100–2200 years (150 BCE) for Somali T-M184 bearers.

Deep subclade E-Y18629 is commonly found in Somalis and has a formation date of 3,700 YBP (years before present) and a TMRCA of 3,300 YBP.

According to mtDNA studies a significant proportion of the maternal lineages of Somali females consists of sub saharan clades such as L haplogroup, the most frequently observed haplogroups are L0a1d, L2a1h and L3f.

African mitochondrial (mt) phylogeny is coarsely resolved but the majority of population data generated so far is limited to the analysis of the first hypervariable segment (HVS-1) of the control region (CR). Therefore, this study aimed on the investigation of the entire CR of 190 unrelated Somali individuals to enrich the severely underrepresented African mtDNA pool. The majority (60.5 %) of the haplotypes were of sub-Saharan origin with L0a1d, L2a1h and L3f being the most frequently observed haplogroups. Our sub-Saharan samples consisted almost entirely of the L1 or L2 haplogroups only. In addition, there existed a significant amount of homogeneity within the M1 haplogroup. This sharp cline indicates a history of little admixture between these regions. This could imply a more recent ancestry for M1 in Africa, as older lineages are more diverse and widespread by nature, and may be an indication of a back-migration into Africa from the Middle East."

M1 haplogroup is also observed at a rate of over. This mitochondrial clade is common among Ethiopians and North Africans, particularly Egyptians and Algerians. M1 is believed to have originated in Asia, where its parent M clade represents the majority of mtDNA lineages.

"We analysed mtDNA variation in ~250 persons from Libya, Somalia, and Congo/Zambia, as representatives of the three regions of interest. Our initial results indicate a sharp cline in M1 frequencies that generally does not extend into sub-Saharan Africa. While our North and especially East African samples contained frequencies of M1 over 20%,

=== Autosomal ancestry ===
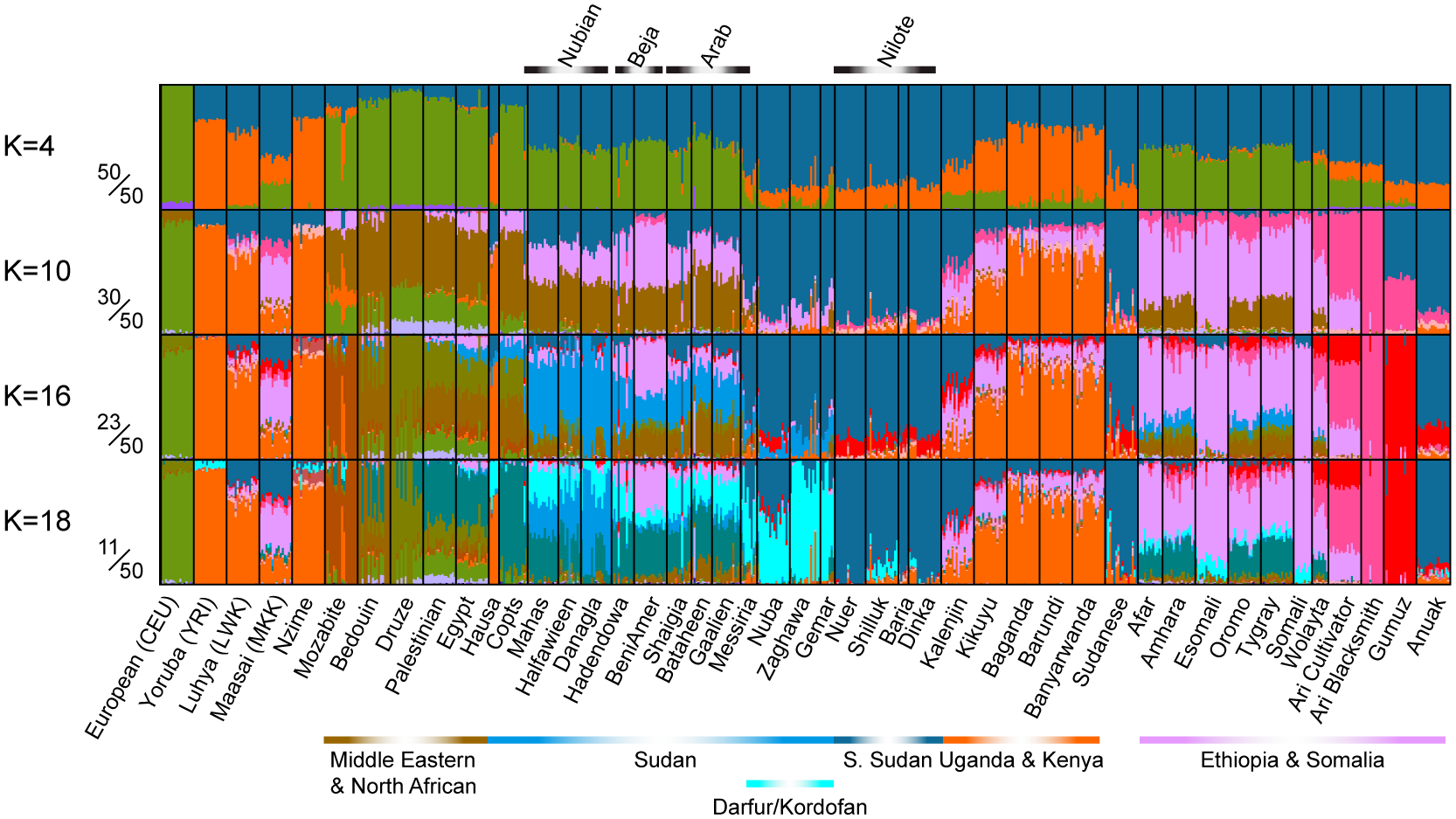
Genetic components present in select Cushitic/HOA populations (Hollfelder, Nina et al., 2017)

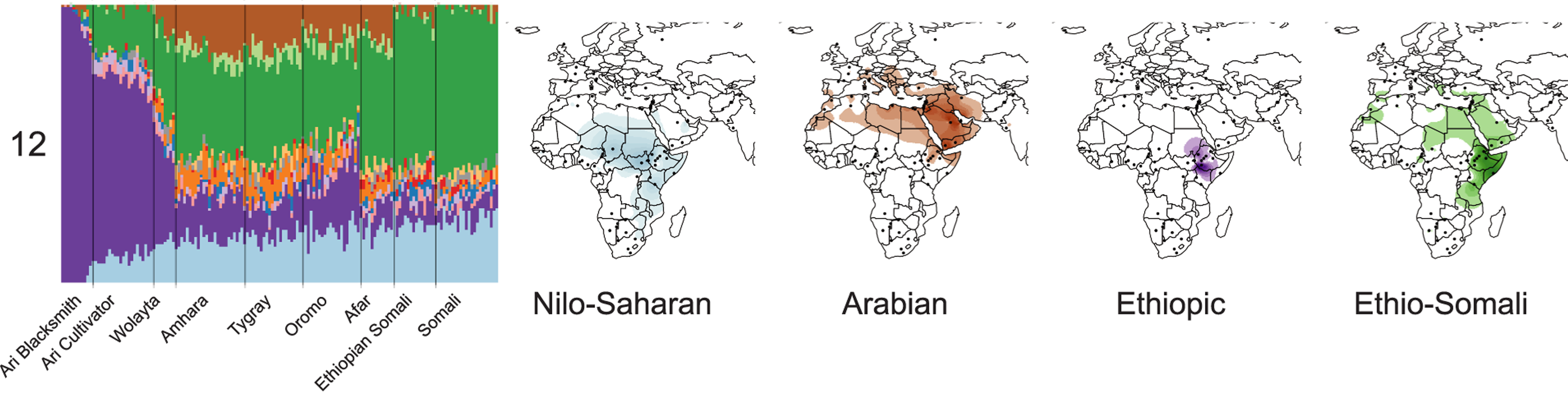
Genetic components present in select Horn African populations

Research shows that Somalis have a mixture of a type of native African ancestry unique and autochthonous to the Horn of Africa, as well as ancestry originating from a non-African back-migration. A medical genomics study concluded that its data reveal a remarkably homogeneous Somali population that shares an ancient origin with Afro-Asiatic-speaking groups in the Horn of Africa and the Middle East.

Portrait of a Somali man, French Somaliland, 1940s

According to an autosomal DNA study by Hodgson et al. (2014), the Afro-Asiatic languages were likely spread across Africa and the Near East by an ancestral population(s) carrying a newly identified non-African genetic component, which the researchers dub as the "Ethio-Somali". This component today is most common among Afro-Asiatic-speaking populations in the Horn of Africa. It reaches a frequency peak among ethnic Somalis, representing the majority of their ancestry. The Ethio-Somali component is most closely related to the Maghrebi non-African genetic component, and is believed to have diverged from all other non-African ancestries at least 23,000 years ago. On this basis, the researchers suggest that the original Ethio-Somali carrying population(s) probably arrived in the pre-agricultural period from the Near East, having crossed over into northeastern Africa via the Sinai Peninsula. The population then likely split into two branches, with one group heading westward toward the Maghreb and the other moving south into the Horn. Ancient DNA analysis indicates that this foundational ancestry in the Horn region is akin to that of Neolithic farmers of the southern Levant.

Furthermore, according to Hodgson et al. both the African ancestry (Ethiopic) and the non-African ancestry (Ethio-Somali) in Cushitic speaking populations is significantly differentiated from all neighboring African and non-African ancestries today. The overall genetic ancestry of Cushitic and Semitic speaking populations in the Horn of Africa represents ancestries not found outside of HOA populations. The researchers state:

"The African Ethiopic ancestry is tightly restricted to HOA populations and likely represents an autochthonous HOA population. The non-African ancestry in the HOA, which is primarily attributed to a novel Ethio-Somali inferred ancestry component, is significantly differentiated from all neighboring non-African ancestries in North Africa, the Levant, and Arabia."

Moreover, Hodgson et al. (2014) elaborates further:

"We find that most of the non-African ancestry in the HOA can be assigned to a distinct non-African origin Ethio-Somali ancestry component, which is found at its highest frequencies in Cushitic and Semitic speaking HOA populations."

Molinaro, Ludovica et al. in 2019 characterized the Non-African ancestry in Ethiopian Somalis as being derived from Anatolia Neolithic groups (similar to Tunisian Jews). Ali, A.A., Aalto, M., Jonasson, J. et al. (2020) using principal component analysis showed that approximately 60% of Somali ancestry is East African and 40% Western Eurasian.

== Somali studies ==
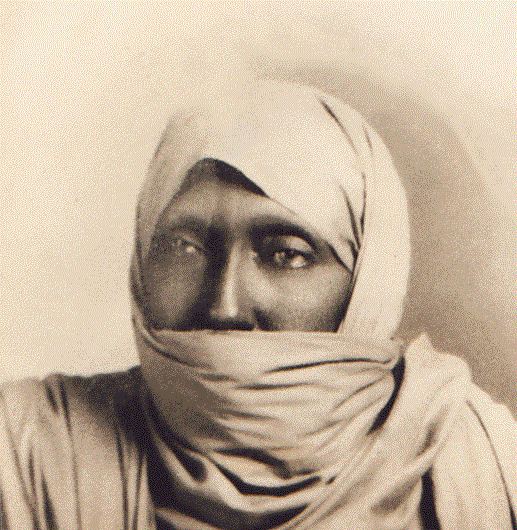
Pioneering Somali Studies scholar, Osman Yusuf Kenadid

The scholarly term for research concerning Somalis and Greater Somalia is Somali studies. It consists of several disciplines such as anthropology, sociology, linguistics, historiography and archaeology. The field draws from old Somali chronicles, records and oral literature, in addition to written accounts and traditions about Somalis from explorers and geographers in the Horn of Africa and the Middle East. Since 1980, prominent Somalist scholars from around the world have also gathered annually to hold the International Congress of Somali Studies.

== See also ==
- Somalia
- Somaliland
- Women in Somalia
- Culture of Somalia
- Demographics of Somalia
- Greater Somalia
- Anti-Somali sentiment

== Bibliography ==
- Hanley, Gerald, Warriors: Life and Death Among the Somalis, (Eland Publishing Ltd, 2004)
- Tripodi, Paolo (1999). The Colonial Legacy in Somalia. New York: St. Martin's Press Inc.
