= List of British Somalis =

The following is a list of notable British Somalis.

== Entertainment ==
- Aar Maanta, singer-songwriter
- Amin Mohamed, better known as Chunkz, YouTube Personality
- Hudeydi, musician
- Maya Jama, radio presenter
- Poly Styrene, early Punk musician
- Prince Abdi, stand-up comedian

== Politics ==
- Abdulrahim Abby Farah, Welsh born diplomat
- Magid Magid, Green Party politician; former Lord Mayor of Sheffield (2018-2019) and MEP for Yorkshire and the Humber
- Mohamed Mohamud Ibrahim, Deputy Foreign Minister of Somalia (formerly lived in Harlesden)
- Sir Mark Hendrick, Labour MP for Preston (2000-present)
- Sagal Abdi-Wali, Member of Parliament (MP) for Holborn and St Pancras

== Business ==
- Abdirashid Duale, CEO of Dahabshiil

== Fashion ==
- Samira Hashi, model and activist

== Media ==
- Mo Ali, film director
- Mohamoud Sheikh Dalmar, journalist
- Rageh Omaar, journalist and writer

== Activism ==
- Nimco Ali, activist
- Amal Azzudin, activist
- Leyla Hussein, psychotherapist
- Hanan Ibrahim, activist
- Adam Matan OBE, activist
- Hashi Mohamed, barrister/activist

== Writing ==
- Nadifa Mohamed, novelist
- Hirsi Magan Isse, scholar, intellectual, and political dissident
- Hibo Wardere, campaigner against female genital mutilation (FGM), author, public speaker
- Warsan Shire, writer and poet
- Diriye Osman, writer and artist

== Sport ==
- Mukhtar Ali, footballer
- Ramla Ali, professional boxer
- Ibrahim Farah, Welsh professional footballer
- Mo Farah, British long-distance runner
- Islam Feruz, professional footballer
- Iqra Ismail, English football manager
- Abdi Jama, wheelchair basketballer
- Mukhtar Mohammed, middle distance runner
- Jawahir Roble, British football referee

== Other ==
- Hussain Bisad, former world's largest hands
- Mahmood Hussein Mattan, sailor
- Ramzi Mohammed, convicted criminal involved in the 21 July 2005 London attempted bombings

== See also ==
- List of British Bangladeshis
- List of British Pakistanis
