= Somalis in the United Kingdom =

Ethnic group

British Somalis
Total population
- Somali-born residents 109,567 (England, Wales and Northern Ireland, 2021 census); 1,313 (Scotland, 2022 census); Somali ethnic or national identity 176,645 (England and Wales only, 2021 census)

Regions with significant populations
- London · Birmingham · Bristol · Manchester · Leicester · Sheffield · Cardiff · Liverpool

Languages
- Majority: Somali and English; Minority: Arabic and Chimwiini

Religion
- Islam (Sunni and Sufism)

Related ethnic groups
- Somali Americans, Somali Australians and Somali Canadians

Somalis in the United Kingdom include British citizens and residents born in or with ancestors from Somalia. The United Kingdom (UK) is home to the largest Somali community in Europe, with 109,567 Somali-born immigrants residing in England, Wales and Northern Ireland at the time of the 2021 census and 1,313 in Scotland at the time of its 2022 census. The majority of these live in England, with the largest number found in London. Smaller Somali communities exist in Birmingham, Bristol, Manchester, Leicester, Sheffield, Cardiff, Liverpool, Milton Keynes and Slough.

The earliest Somali immigrants in the UK were lascars and merchants who arrived in the 19th century. A second small group of seamen came during the Second World War with the Royal Navy from the British Somaliland (present-day Somaliland). During the 1980s and 1990s, the civil war in Somalia led to a large number of Somali immigrants, comprising the majority of the current Somali population in the UK.

British Somalis are one of the largest Muslim communities in the UK.

Notable British Somalis include notable sports figures, filmmakers, activists and local politicians. They have also established business networks and media organisations.

== History and settlement ==
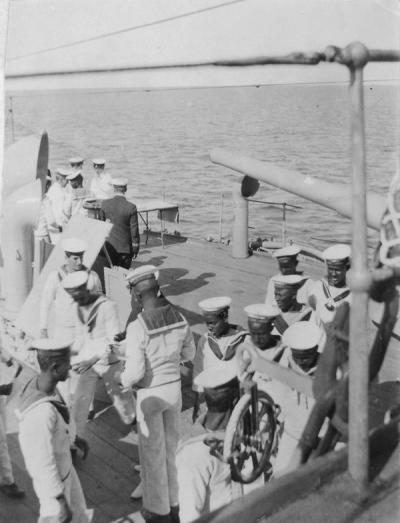
Somali crewmen on HMS Venus

The Somali community in the UK includes British citizens, refugees, asylum seekers, persons granted exceptional leave to remain, irregular migrants, and Somalis who have moved to Britain after being granted refugee status in other European states. Most Somalia-born residents in England and Wales hold a UK passport.

According to the 2011 Census, 36 per cent of Somali-born residents of England and Wales arrived in the UK during the 1990s. The majority (57 per cent) arrived after 2001, with around 25 per cent arriving between 2001 and 2003.

=== Early migration ===
The United Kingdom has historically been tied closely to Somaliland through its involvement in the British Somaliland protectorate. This link has given rise to a long tradition of Somali migration to the United Kingdom. Mobility has played an important part in Somali culture. The first Somali immigrants were seamen and merchants who settled in port cities in the late 19th century, mainly in Cardiff, Liverpool and London. The Isaaqs were among the first Somalis to arrive in the United Kingdom in the 1880s. Many of these early sailors came from British Somaliland and worked in the thriving docks. In Cardiff, many lived in boarding houses run by other Somalis. Along with Yemeni seamen, these Somali sailors were among the lascars from the Arab world that were working in the British shipping industry. Following race riots in Cardiff and other cities in 1919, around 600 of the Somali, Egyptian and other residents from the Arab world were evacuated to their home countries. Similar disturbances occurred in Salford in 1921 and South Shields in 1930. Somalis are recorded as living in London back to 1914, having been recruited to fight in the First World War.

One of the attractions at the Great Exhibition in Bradford in 1904 was a 'Somali Village' in the city's Lister Park where 57 Somalis lived in a walled compound for six months. Ongoing research is reevaluating what was described at the time as a "living ethnographic display".

A second, small group came during the Second World War with the Royal Navy and stayed in search of employment. They had been recruited as seafarers from parts of the British Empire due to shortages in manpower. Most of these seamen considered their stay in the UK as temporary and had left their families behind. As a result of an act of Parliament passed in 1894, until the 1950s, Somali migrants were legally restricted to working in the shipping industry, were paid at rates of 25% below the standard workforce rate, and legally required to settle only in towns and cities that were centres of shipping. They were mainly concentrated in Cardiff and South Shields, which in 1938 had 116 and 47 Somalian-born sailors, respectively. Consequently, the resident Arabic-speaking populations were typically known as "Somali" since most of the seamen in these ports came from the regions near the Gulf of Aden. In 1953, there were around 600 Somalis living in the UK. When the British merchant navy started to reduce in size in the 1950s, many of these migrants moved to industrial cities such as Birmingham, Sheffield and Manchester, where labour was in great demand. The first Somalis to arrive in Sheffield did so in the 1930s. More arrived between the 1940s and 1960s, particularly to work in the city's steel industry. Somalis also worked in the steel industry in South Wales, taking on physically demanding work that did not appeal to the Welsh workers. In 1952, a Somali man was one of the last people to be hanged in Wales, for the murder of a shopkeeper and moneylender in Butetown, Cardiff. His conviction was quashed in 1998.

By the 1960s, there were still only a few Somali women in the United Kingdom. After the British industry started to experience heavy growth, Somali men brought over their wives and families. Somali women subsequently began establishing community organisations in the cities where they resided, some of which still exist to this day. In the 1960s and 1970s, Somali students from British Somaliland also came to study in Britain. Some chose to remain in the United Kingdom, while others returned to Somalia after graduating. Some long-settled Somalis also returned to Somalia in the 1960s, following the country's independence, though many subsequently moved back to Britain as a result of growing instability during the 1980s.

In 1982, when the British government requisitioned civilian ships for the Falklands War, three British-registered sailors of Somali origin were denied employment on the basis of their race. The industry had been outside of the remit of the 1976 Race Relations Act, and discrimination within the industry was significant. In 1982, 90% of Somali seamen living in Cardiff were unemployed. This was upheld as unlawful by an industrial tribunal and an appeal court, and the case contributed to considerable focus in the media on the issue of discrimination in the shipping industry.

=== Refugees and asylum seekers ===
Principal asylum applications by Somali nationals, excluding dependants, United Kingdom, 1999–2013 (Note: Figures are rounded to the nearest five.)
		Initial decisions (Note: Note that a decision is not necessarily made in the same year as the application it relates to, so decisions do not sum to the number of applications.)			Final decisions
Year	Applications received	Granted asylum	Granted temporary protection (Note: Exceptional leave, humanitarian protection or discretionary leave.)	Applications rejected	Applications rejected
1999	7,495	130	55	120	
2000	5,020	5,310	3,575	2,365	
2001	6,420	2,910	1,995	3,525	
2002	6,540	2,515	1,405	2,815	
2003	5,090	1,665	550	3,835	
2004	2,585	455	460	2,355	
2005	1,760	660	195	1,000	
2006	1,845	655	165	905	
2007	1,615	805	105	700	
2008	1,345	490	75	550	245
2009	930	410	75	565	220
2010	590	350	80	410	270
2011	580	355	55	175	
2012	600	310	30	140	
2013	450	230	10	160	
2014	335	135	10	180	
2015	385	175	15	270	
2016	350	75	20	160	
2017	300	120	5	165	

During the 1980s and 1990s, the civil war in Somalia led to a large number of Somali immigrants, comprising the majority of the current Somali population in the UK. Between 1988 and 1994, the favoured destination of people fleeing the civil war was Scandinavia, but by 1999 53 per cent of Somali asylum applications in Europe were made in the UK. Many of these asylum seekers had fled from neighbouring countries such as Ethiopia before migrating to the UK. Many of these refugees were women and children whose men had either been killed or had stayed in Somalia to fight, changing the Somali settlement from one of single seamen to that of refugee communities. Between 1985 and 2006, Somalis figured among the top ten largest country of origin groups of people seeking asylum in the UK. In the late 1980s, most of these early migrants were granted refugee status, while those arriving later in the 1990s more often obtained temporary status.

Some Somali refugees have also been resettled in the UK under the government's Gateway Protection Programme, which was launched in 2004. Under this scheme, refugees designated as particularly vulnerable by the UNHCR are assessed for eligibility under the 1951 Refugee Convention by the Home Office. If they meet the eligibility criteria they are then brought to the UK and granted indefinite leave to remain. The first Somali refugees to be resettled arrived in 2010, and between 2010 and 2012, a total of 418 Somalis were resettled in the UK. Further numbers of Somalis were resettled under the programme in 2013.

People whose asylum applications have been rejected but who remain in the UK constitute one of a number of categories of irregular immigrants. In 2010, 270 Somalis had their asylum claims rejected in final decisions. The British government has a declared policy of not deporting failed asylum seekers to Somalia as it considers it too dangerous for return, although it has forcibly returned people to regions of the country that are more stable and accessible by air, such as Somaliland. In April 2014 the Home Office issued new advice to its case workers, suggesting that it is now safe to return people to the capital, Mogadishu. In a test case in June 2014, a judge granted an injunction to halt that deportation of a Somali man to Mogadishu. Some Somalis had been returned to Mogadishu prior to the issuance of new guidance, and the returns were subject to criticism from members of the Somali community as well as human rights groups and organisations. Of those Somalis whose asylum claims have been declined or whose temporary status had expired, some have voluntarily repatriated. Many others have been subject to indefinite detention in immigration detention centres.

=== Secondary migration ===
There has also been some secondary migration of Somalis to the UK from the Netherlands, Sweden and Denmark. According to refugee expert Jill Rutter, in some locations, secondary migrants make up the majority of the Somali community. An academic article published in 2011 suggests that, since 2000, between 10,000 and 20,000 Somalis in the Netherlands have moved to the UK. The driving forces behind this secondary migration included: a desire to reunite with family and friends; a rise in Dutch opposition to Muslim immigration; Somali opposition to housing policies which forced them to live scattered in small groups all over various cities rather than in a larger agglomerated community; a restrictive socio-economic environment which, among other things, made it difficult for new arrivals to find work; and the comparative ease of starting a business and acquiring the means to get off social welfare in the UK. Research into this relocation also suggests that some Somali migrants in the Netherlands did not intend to end up there as a final destination. Their journeys may have been interrupted in the Netherlands, or they may have had little choice about their destination. As a result, some secondary migration can be seen in the context of the desire to complete an intended migration to the UK.

=== Naturalisation and grants of settlement ===
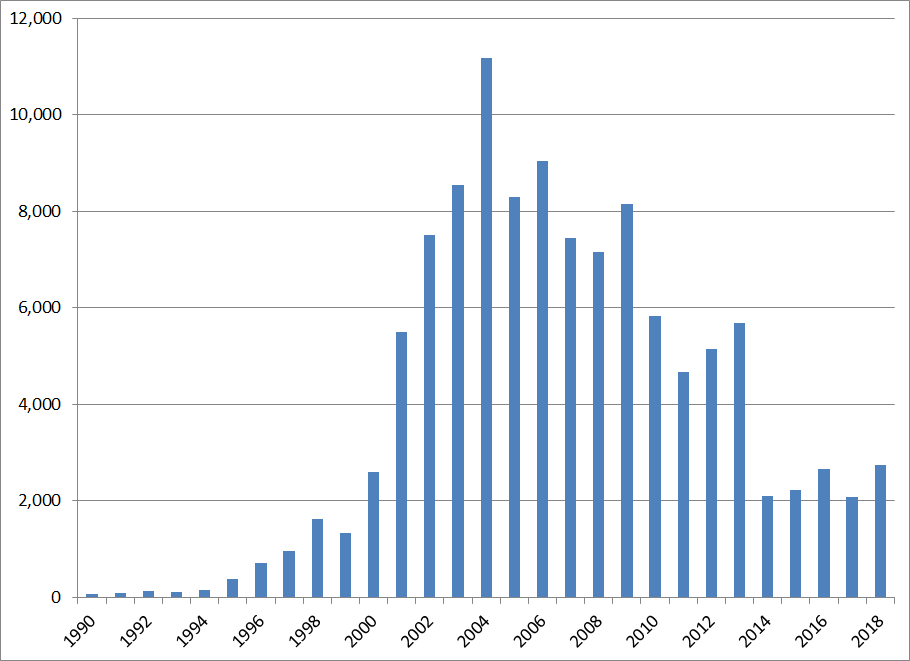
Grants of British citizenship to Somali nationals, 1990–2018

Between 1983 and 1994, the number of Somalis granted British citizenship was generally low, ranging from 40 in 1987 to 140 in 1994. In 1995 the number of grants of citizenship started to rise significantly, reaching a peak of 11,165 in 2004, before falling somewhat in the following years. In 2018, 2,746 Somali nationals were granted British citizenship, accounting for around 1.75 per cent of all naturalisations and making Somali the 18th most common nationality amongst those granted citizenship that year.

According to the 2011 UK Census, 71.5 per cent of Somalia-born residents in England and Wales hold a UK passport. This is the sixth highest proportion amongst foreign-born groups.

In addition to naturalisation, the British government can grant settlement to foreign nationals. This confers upon foreign nationals permanent residence in the UK, without granting them British citizenship. Grants of settlement are made on the basis of various factors, including employment, family formation and reunification, and asylum (including to deal with backlogs of asylum cases). The total number of grants of settlement to Somali nationals was 1,952 in 2017, out of a total of 65,102 for all foreign nationals, compared to 4,900 out of 241,192 in 2010.

== Demographics ==
=== Population and distribution ===
Location	Somali-born population (2011 Census)	Somali-born population (2021 Census)	Somalis regardless of birthplace (2003–2007 estimates collated by CLG)	Somalis regardless of birthplace (2006 estimates by ICAR)
London	65,333	66,288		70,000
Birmingham	7,765	10,812	3,000–4,000	35,000
Bristol	4,947	4,654		
Manchester	3,645	4,272	5,000–6,000	
Leicester	3,209	3,394	10,000–15,000	15,000
Sheffield	2,372	2,575	3,000–5,000	10,000
Cardiff	1,672	1,624		10,000
Liverpool	1,249	1,072	3,000–5,000	
Slough	1,247	1,336		
Coventry	1,181	1,236		
Milton Keynes	1,141	1,313		

As of 2018, the UK was believed to have the largest Somali community in Europe. The Office for National Statistics estimates that 108,000 Somali-born immigrants were resident in the UK in 2018.

In the 2021 UK census, 106,912 people in England were recorded as having been born in Somalia, as well as 2,009 in Wales, and 646 in Northern Ireland. The census in Scotland was delayed by a year until 2022 and recorded 1,313 residents born in Somalia. The previous, 2011 census recorded 99,484 Somali-born residents in England, 1,886 in Wales, 1,591 in Scotland, and 88 in Northern Ireland. The previous census, held in 2001, had recorded 43,532 Somali-born residents. This was widely considered an undercount, and in response, the Office for National Statistics employed the services of a Somali community adviser in the run-up to the 2011 Census in order to address possible under-enumeration of Somalis.

Estimates of the Somali-born population are complicated by the exchange of Somalis both arriving in the UK and those deciding to return to Somalia or elsewhere. According to academic Laura Hammond, this mobility is common within the Somali diaspora, with many having residences in both Somalia and the UK. Somali immigrants from the more stable regions of Somalia often vacation in those areas for extended periods during the summer. The United Nations Development Programme estimated in 2009 that 10,000 Somalis were visiting the northwestern Somaliland region from the UK annually, though Hammond argues that this total may also include people simply transferring through the UK.

The ethnic classification of Somalis in Britain has varied over the years. During the early 20th century, Somalis were administered as "Somali" or "Arab" in tandem with Egyptians, Sudanese, Zanzibaris and Yemenis. Along with other groups from the Arab world, Africa, the Caribbean and South Asia, these populations were also sometimes collectively identified in a non-racial, political sense with the epithet "black" or its then neutral equivalent "coloured" in order to underscore their common experience of colonial subordination.

Presently, there is no "Somali" option amongst the tick-box answers to the ethnicity question in the UK Census. Respondents who identify as Somali can, however, indicate this through a write-in response option. Following lobbying from Somali and other groups, a new "Arab" tick-box was introduced in the 2011 Census. According to sociologists Peter J. Aspinall and Martha Judith Chinouya, qualitative findings indicate that "groups from northern Africa, the Horn of Africa, and some parts of the eastern coastline and islands of Africa may not identify themselves as black African. It was felt that they don't see themselves as black or African and might describe themselves by nationality specifically (eg, Somali or Sudanese), perhaps Afro-Arabs, or Arab-African". Aspinall and Lavinia Mitton note that "those from Somalia may consider themselves to be Arab-African rather than Black African because of their religion and physical features". The Policy Research Centre argued that "the inclusion of Arab will help refine the British Muslim picture as many Arabic speaking British citizens who are Muslim, as well as many who are not, could not find an appropriate category, and selecting from 3 or 4 near matches". However, it cautioned that "the new Arab ethnic category will give us a clearer picture, but could confuse the Somali ethnic count[...] this may lead to challenges in accurately sizing citizens of Somali heritage. Such respondents will have to choose between Arab as a linguistic choice and Black African as a geographical and/or racial choice. Moreover, because of such community drives to get Somalis more noticed, it is likely Somali responses under the Black section will be split between African and Other Black". Question testing with Somalis in Wales in the run-up to the census revealed inconsistent answering of the ethnicity question. Some Somali participants in the test ticked the "African" box, others wrote in "Somali", and one person ticked both "African" and "Arab". Some Somali participants in both Wales and England believed that there was a need for a Somali tick-box, whereas others felt that the African option was sufficient. No Somali, Egyptian, Berber, Kurdish or Iranian respondents chose to identify solely as Arab. Similarly, question testing in Scotland found that "Somalian" was the most frequent write-in response given under the "African or Caribbean: Other" heading. "Somalian" was also the most common write-in response under "Other ethnic group: Other".

When the 2011 Census was conducted, 37,708 residents in England and Wales wrote in "Somali" and 5,226 wrote in "Somalilander" under the "Black/African/Caribbean/Black British" heading in response to the ethnicity question. 6,146 wrote "Somali" and 826 "Somalilander" under the "Other ethnic group" heading. Others also wrote in "Somali" or "Somalilander" under the "White" (743 "Somali" and 151 "Somalilander"), "Mixed/multiple ethnic groups" (621 "Somali"), and "Asian/Asian British" (257 "Somali") headings. In Scotland, 238 people wrote in "Somali" under the African heading. With regard to the "Arab" tick-box and write-in ethnic identity responses, the National Association of British Arabs indicates that "many people responded to the question in terms of a refined categorisation, and specifically those Arabs from North Africa and Somalia", but notes that it is uncertain how many of these individuals responded in the general 'Arab' box. The organisation categorises Somalia-born immigrants as Arabs. Based on census data, it indicates that they are the largest population of British Arabs by country of birth. December 2018 saw the publication of the 2021 Census White Paper, which proposes further changes to the ethnicity classification - specifically, the addition of a tick box for the Roma population, and a ‘search as you type’ facility to make it easier for people of Somali origin to use the write in under ‘Black African’.

In the 2021 census, 150,649 residents of England and Wales wrote in "Somali" and 25,446 "Somalilander" under the "Black, Black British, Black Welsh of African background" heading", 6,396 wrote in "Somali" under "Black, Black British, Black Welsh or Caribbean background", and 11,300 wrote in "Somali" and 1840 "Somalilander" under "Other ethnic group". In Northern Ireland, 27 people were recorded as "Other: Somali". In Scotland's 2022 census, 2,042 were recorded as "Other African: Somali", 69 as "Other African: Somalilander", 34 as "Mixed or multiple ethnic group: Somali" and 10 as "Other White: Somali".

The Office for National Statistics has calculated that 176,645 usual residents of England and Wales (0.3% of the population) identified as Somali as their ethnic group, national identity, or both in the 2021 census. This was an increase of 78.5% from the previous, 2011 census, when the equivalent number was 98,937 (0.2% of the population).

As with estimates of the total Somali population in the UK, estimates by city vary significantly between sources. This problem is partly the result of defining "Somali", with some sources estimating the Somali-born population only, and others estimating the size of the ethnic Somali community, including second and subsequent-generation British Somalis. The 2011 census found that 65,333 Somali-born people were resident in London. Other sources suggest that Cardiff has the highest number of British-born people of Somali heritage anywhere in the UK, though the number of Somali-born immigrants there is relatively low.

Peter J. Aspinall argues that "the census is primarily designed to serve the needs of government and cannot meet the requirements of local authorities where particular groups outwith the category system may cluster. Examples include the Somalis and Yemenis in Sheffield, the City Council arguing that a new approach to capturing a wider range of ethnic groups is needed where their numbers are not significant nationally". A 2003 report prepared for the London Borough of Hackney noted that: "Lack of sensitivity in monitoring has contributed to the Somali community's—often desperate—needs being overlooked". The final report of the Commission on Race and Ethnic Disparities, published in March 2021, argued that "2 categories that could in future be helpfully sub-divided are White Other which does not distinguish between West Europeans and East Europeans, and Black African which does not distinguish between sub-Saharan African people in general and Somalis who are now a substantial group in their own right".

=== Gender and age distribution ===
The Somali-born population of the UK includes a disproportionate number of females in comparison with the general population. Analysis of data from the Labour Force Survey by the Institute for Public Policy Research (IPPR) suggests that 61 per cent of the Somali-born population in 2006/07 was female. Of the 101,370 Somali-born residents of England and Wales recorded by the 2011 Census, 57,042 (56.3 per cent) were female. The equivalent figure for the UK as a whole from the previous census, held in 2001, was 54 per cent. Expressed as a sex ratio, the 2011 figure suggests that there were 78 Somali-born men per 100 Somali-born women, compared to the overall sex ratio for England and Wales of 97 men per 100 women.

A number of explanations for this high proportion of female Somali-born immigrants have been advanced. The IPPR suggests that it might be due to more men than women being killed in the Somali Civil War, leaving women as refugees, that some Somali men have left Britain for work in the Arab states of the Persian Gulf, where their employment prospects are better, and also that some Somali men have left the UK in order to return to Somaliland, whilst their families stay behind to enable the completion of education. The civil war in Somalia resulted in a change in the composition of the Somali population in the UK. Prior to the 1980s, it was primarily composed of single seamen; as a result of the war it became a refugee community with an increased proportion of women and children.

Harris states that the divorce rate for Somalis in the UK is high. She explains: "If a man is unemployed, brings in no income, spends what his wife earns or receives from social security on khat, will not help with domestic chores, and colludes with nagging in-laws – then a woman may feel better off without him". Writing in 2006, refugee education expert Jill Rutter reported that research suggested between 20 and 70 per cent of Somali households in Britain were headed by single females. In the 2011 Census, 61 per cent of families in England and Wales where the head of the household was born in Somalia consisted of lone parents with dependent children. This was the highest proportion of all countries of birth. 7.6 per cent of Somali-born lone parents were men, around half of the proportion of male lone parents in the population as a whole.

According to the 2011 UK Census, the Somali-born population in England and Wales is on average young. 79 per cent of Somali immigrants were under 45 years of age compared with 58 per cent of the general population. Partly due to the Somali-born population's younger age structure, 47 per cent of Somali immigrant families included three or more dependent children compared with a mean of 7 per cent for all families in England and Wales.

=== Language ===
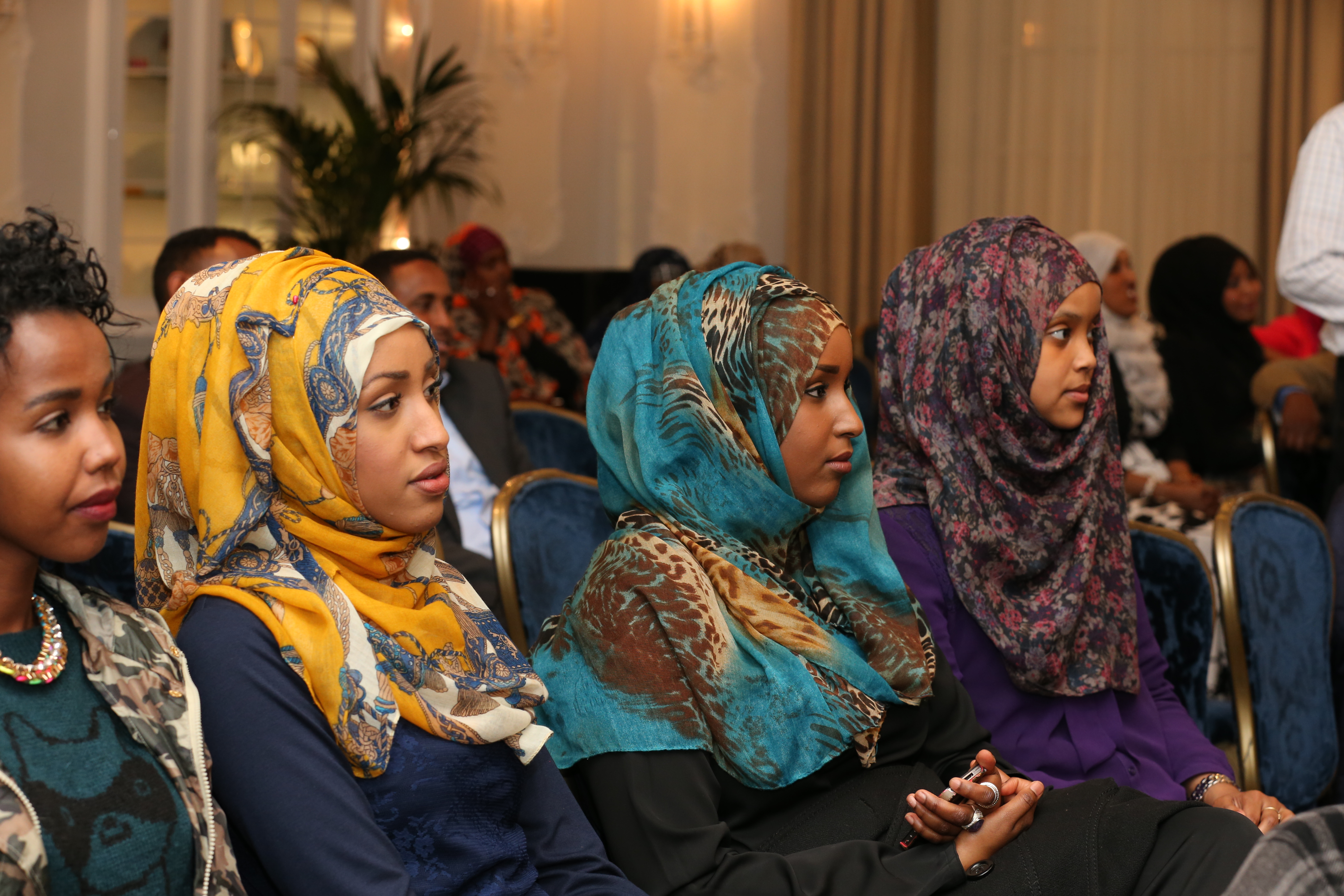
Somali women at a Somali language event in London.

The 2011 UK Census recorded 85,918 people living in England and Wales who spoke Somali as their main language. This represented 0.16 per cent of the population, and 2.06 per cent of speakers of non-English main languages. Somali speakers were present in only a few wards (16 per cent). The number of Somali speakers recorded in Scotland was 1,050.

Some Somalis in the UK also speak Arabic, another Afro-Asiatic tongue and the other official language of Somalia, with about 15 per cent of Somalis in England being fluent in it according to a 2006 report by the Foreign Policy Centre. The Somali community in the UK also includes a small minority of Chimwiini speakers.

According to the 2011 UK Census, 73,765 of a total 101,131 Somalia-born residents in England and Wales indicated that English was not their main language. Of those, 54,369 individuals indicated that they could speak the language well or very well, 16,575 indicated that they could not speak the language well, and 2,821 indicated that they could not speak the language at all. 27,366 of the Somalia-born residents reported that English was their main language.

=== Religion ===
The majority of Somalis, in the UK and elsewhere, are Muslims. The majority adhere to the Sunni branch of Islam and the Shafi`i school of Islamic jurisprudence. According to the 2011 UK census, 94,197 or roughly 93% of Somalia-born residents in England and Wales are Muslim. They constitute one of the largest Muslim groups in the UK. Mosques are the primary centres for religious and social gatherings, and also play an important role in sharing information. Traditionally, Somalis attended masjids established by the more settled Muslim communities from Asian and Arab countries, though there are now a small number of mosques operated by Somalis.

Research conducted for the London Borough of Camden, published in 2002, notes that levels of religious adherence and interpretations of Islam within the Somali community varies according to social class. Overall, the research suggested that Somali migrants' adherence to Islam tended to increase in the UK, as it "offers a unique common denominator in constructing a specifically Somali identity".

=== Qualifications ===
Levels of education amongst Somali-born adults in the UK are low relative to many other foreign-born groups and to the British-born population. Analysis of Labour Force Survey data by the Institute for Public Policy Research, published in 2008, shows that in 2006/07, 48 per cent of the working-age Somali-born population of the UK had no qualifications. 6 per cent had GCSEs at grades A*-C or equivalent foreign qualifications, and 19 per cent had A-levels or their equivalent. The remaining 27 per cent were classified as having "other qualifications". The IPPR note that it is often difficult to classify foreign qualifications, and hence a higher proportion of foreign-born populations are classified in this category than the UK-born population. When immigrants' qualifications are classified as "other", they note, they are often of a high level.

According to the 2011 Census, out of a total of 89,022 Somali-born residents aged 16 and over in the UK, 55 per cent had completed up to a lower secondary education (ISCED Level 2), 25 per cent had completed up to an upper secondary education (ISCED Level 3), 20 per cent had completed up to the first stage of tertiary education (ISCED Level 5), and 0.3 per cent had completed up to the second stage of tertiary education (ISCED Level 6). By comparison, 29 per cent of all foreign-born residents aged 16 and over had completed up to a lower secondary education, 24 per cent had completed up to an upper secondary education, 46 per cent had completed up to the first stage of tertiary education, and 0.9 per cent had completed up to the second stage of tertiary education.

According to the IPPR, the relatively low level of education among Somali migrants in the UK can be attributed to their migratory history and the situation in their country of origin. They note that, like many other refugee and migrant communities, early Somali migrants tend to be relatively well educated, but later arrivals, including family members of early migrants, are less well qualified. Labour migrants arriving prior to 1988 were generally literate in either English or Arabic, although few had completed secondary education. Many of the initial wave of refugees from the Somali Civil War who started to arrive from 1988 onwards were well educated, with many possessing secondary education and some holding degrees. According to the IPPR, the educational profile of Somali migrants subsequently changed again, because of the impact of the civil war on education in Somalia. In the north, including Somaliland, the majority of schools in urban areas were destroyed, along with higher education institutions. In the south, "education has been completely destroyed by the fighting". While some schools have been rebuilt and have reopened, the IPPR reports that "younger Somalis who have come directly from Somalia will not have attended university and are likely to have had a very interrupted education or none at all".

=== Employment ===
Occupations by year of arrival of Somali-born residents aged 16 and over in employment, England and Wales, 2011
Occupations	All Somali-born	Arrived before 1981	Arrived 1981–1990	Arrived 1991–2000	Arrived 2001–2011
Managers, directors and senior officials	5.0%	7.7%	6.6%	4.6%	4.9%
Professional occupations	10.1%	24.2%	14.8%	11.4%	7.7%
Associate professional and technical occupations	7.7%	13.5%	12.3%	8.7%	5.9%
Administrative and secretarial occupations	6.8%	8.7%	8.6%	7.3%	6.0%
Skilled trades occupations	4.5%	10.6%	4.1%	4.1%	4.8%
Caring, leisure and other service occupations	14.4%	9.7%	13.0%	14.3%	14.8%
Sales and customer service occupations	11.4%	5.2%	11.1%	11.8%	11.2%
Process, plant and machine operatives	14.2%	8.4%	14.8%	16.3%	12.3%
Elementary occupations	25.9%	11.9%	14.8%	21.5%	32.3%
Total	26,926	310	2,297	11,577	12,742

In 2009, Somali-born migrants had the lowest employment rate among all immigrants in the UK. Figures published by the Office for National Statistics show high rates of economic inactivity and unemployment amongst Somali immigrants. In the three months to June 2008, 31.4 per cent of Somali men and 84.2 per cent of Somali women were economically inactive (the statistics include students, carers and the long-term sick, injured or disabled in this group). Of those who were economically active, 41.4 per cent of the men and 39.1 per cent of the women were unemployed. Employment rates were 40.1 per cent for men and 9.6 per cent for women. The male employment rate in 2008 rose from 21.5 per cent in 1998. Writing in 2013, Jill Rutter states that "over the last 10 years, the employment rate of the Somalia-born population has rarely been above 20 per cent of the 16–64-year-old population".

A report by the Institute for Public Policy Research attributes the low employment rate to the newness of the Somali community and to the fact that most immigrants came in search of asylum rather than through labour migration channels. Research suggests that refugees in general appear to have more difficulty accessing employment than other groups. Many Somalis have had difficulty getting the qualifications that they have gained in Somalia recognised in the UK. Other main employment barriers included lack of references and prior work experience in the UK, unfamiliarity with the UK job culture, discrimination, over-reliance on word-of-mouth for job openings rather than employment centres and classifieds, and lack of fluency in the English language. The IPPR suggests that the high proportion of Somali households that are headed by a single woman may mean that childcare is an additional barrier to Somali women entering employment. Additionally, asylum seekers are also not normally allowed to work for payment while their claims are being processed, although they can request permission to work if they have waited longer than 12 months for an initial decision on their asylum claim.

Analysis of Labour Force Survey (LFS) data by academic Lavinia Mitton suggests that 22 per cent of Somalia-born adults in the UK have experienced difficulty finding and keeping work due to a lack of English-language ability. Mitton and Aspinall also argue that logistic regression analysis of LFS data from 2003, 2006 and 2009 indicates that an ethnic penalty existed for Somalis even after other factors impacting employment, like English language proficiency, work experience, health, age, religion and marital status, had been taken into consideration.

According to the Home Office, 64 per cent of Somali refugees had a low level of English language skills at the time of their asylum decision in the UK, which hindered their ability to find employment. A further 28 per cent had medium fluency, and 8 per cent had high proficiency in the language. Employment rates also steadily increased over time, with 20 per cent of the refugees in employment 8 months after the asylum decision, 28 per cent in employment after 15 months, and 39 per cent in employment after 21 months.

According to the 2011 UK Census, there were 26,926 Somalia-born residents aged 16 and over in employment in England and Wales. Of these immigrants, the majority worked in elementary occupations (26 per cent), with the proportion working in these occupations higher amongst those who had arrived in the UK between 2001 and 2011 than amongst earlier-arriving Somalis. These elementary occupations were the second most common occupations among foreign nationals as a whole, and the most common occupations for individuals who were not proficient in English. The next most common occupations among Somali immigrants were caring, leisure and other service occupations (14 per cent), process, plant and machine operatives (14 per cent), sales and customer service occupations (11 per cent), professional occupations (10 per cent), associate professional and technical occupations (8 per cent), administrative and secretarial occupations (7 per cent), managers, directors and senior officials (5 per cent), and skilled trade occupations (5 per cent).

According to Trust for London, at 37 per cent in 2015–2016, Somalia is the only country of birth for London residents where male worklessness (the proportion of the working-age population who are unemployed or economically inactive) is above 30 per cent. Female worklessness for those born in Somalia was 71 per cent.

== Culture ==
=== Music ===
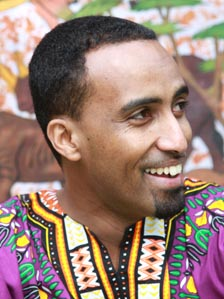
Popular Somali singer Aar Maanta.

Prominent Somali musicians based in the UK include Aar Maanta, who produces an eclectic mix of styles blended with traditional Somali music, such as the classical oud-centred Qaraami ("love songs" in Arabic) style of the 1940s. Poly Styrene (born Marianne Joan Elliott-Said), whose father was Somali, was a member of the punk rock band X-Ray Spex, and later a solo artist. Ahmed Ismail Hussein Hudeidi, who died in London of COVID-19 in April 2020 after having settled in the city, was described by the BBC as "a founding father of modern Somali music".

=== Media ===
The BBC Somali Service is a radio station transmitted in the Somali language around the world. The majority of Somalis in the UK listen to the BBC Somali Service for news and information. While many listen at home via satellite radio or the Internet, others listen in groups at Somali shops, restaurants or mosques.

Somali Eye Media is a media organisation based in London and set up in 2003 by Adam Dirir, a prominent member of the Somali community. It publishes the magazine Somali Eye quarterly, and operates Somali Voice Radio, a radio station, through Sound Radio 1503 AM. Two other UK-based Somali radio stations are Somali On Air and Nomad Radio. Bristol Community FM features a weekly chat show that is hosted by Somali Women's Voice.

There are also a few weekly and monthly Somali newspapers available in the UK in both Somali and English, including Kasmo, Jamhuuriya, and The Somali Voice. Other magazines and newspapers have failed due to poor readership figures. A 2006 survey by the International Organization for Migration suggests that Somalis in the UK prefer to read newspapers such as Metro to improve their English-language skills, although listening to radio was more popular. In 2007, five emerging Somali authors (including Adam Dirir) published Silent Voices, an anthology about Somali life in Britain.

Prominent Somali media figures in the UK include Rageh Omaar, a television news presenter and a writer, and advocate for the Somali community. He received the 2002–2003 Ethnic Multicultural Media Academy award for the best TV journalist. Omaar was formerly a BBC world affairs correspondent, where he made his name reporting on the Iraq War. In September 2006, he moved to a new post at Al Jazeera English, where he currently hosts the current-affairs programme, The Rageh Omaar Show. Yusuf Garaad Omar is a Somali journalist and former head of the BBC Somali Service. Other Somali media figures include Maya Jama, a television and radio presenter, and Mo Ali, a film director born in Saudi Arabia, who debuted in 2010 his feature film, Shank, set in a futuristic London. Somali-British author Nadifa Mohamed's debuting novel, Black Mamba Boy (2009), won the 2010 Betty Trask Award, and was short-listed for several awards, including the 2010 Guardian First Book Award, the 2010 Dylan Thomas Prize, and the 2010 John Llewellyn Rhys Prize. In 2013, Warsan Shire was also selected from a shortlist of six young bards as the first Young Poet Laureate for London, part of the London Legacy Development Corporation's Spoke programme in Queen Elizabeth Olympic Park and the surrounding area. Additionally, visual artist and writer Diriye Osman's short stories have garnered literary recognition, as has comedian and actor Prince Abdi's stand-up.

=== Sport ===
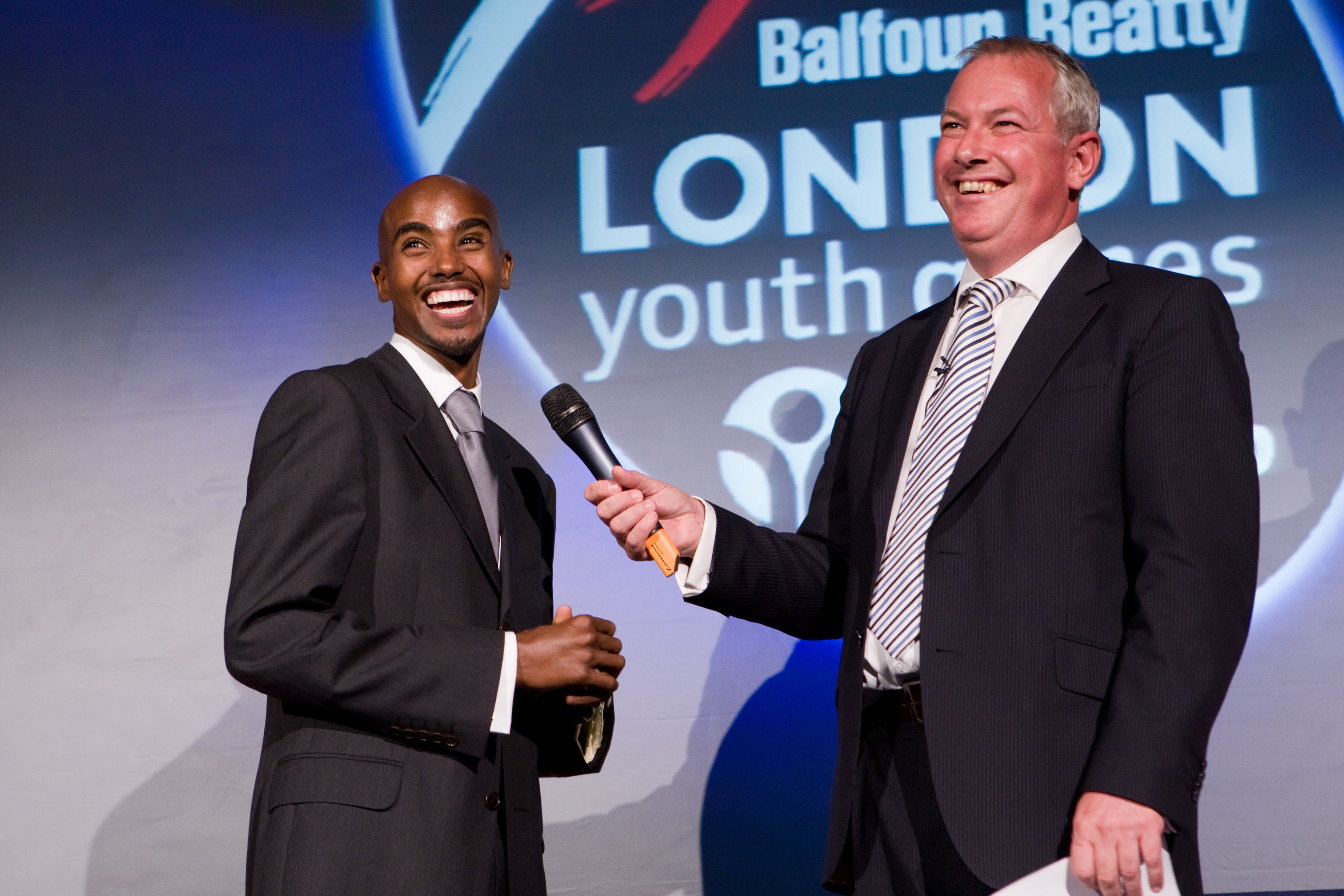
Mo Farah at the 2010 London Youth Games Hall of Fame and Awards Evening.

Somali athletes in the UK include Mo Farah, a long-distance runner who won the gold medals in the 5,000 metres and 10,000 metres at the 2012 London Olympic Games. Farah was born in Mogadishu but grew up in Djibouti and moved to the UK aged eight. He generally competes in the 5,000 metres event, having won his first major title at the European Athletics Junior Championships in 2001. Farah also competes in cross-country running, where in December 2006, he became European champion in Italy. He holds the British indoor record in the 3000 metres. In 2010, Farah earned Great Britain its first ever gold medal in the 10,000-metre event at the European Athletics Championships, as well as a second gold in the 5,000 metres. Since winter 2011, Farah and his wife and daughters have lived in Portland, Oregon, where they moved so that he could train under his American coach, Alberto Salazar. Other prominent Somali athletes in the UK include paralympic bronze medalist Abdi Jama, who was born in Burao and plays wheelchair basketball internationally for Great Britain.

== Social issues ==
Somalis in the UK are subject to a significant degree of social exclusion. Writing in The Guardian in 2008, Jeremy Sare argued that "the social exclusion of British Somalis is unparalleled and mirrors the isolation of Somalia itself". According to an article in The Economist published in 2013, Somalis "are among the poorest, worst-educated and least-employed" refugee populations in Britain. Hammond argues that data on the educational, employment and housing status of Somalis in the UK reveals their "stark living conditions". Hammond cautions against taking these indicators of evidence a lack of desire to integrate on the part of British Somalis, arguing that while non-Somalis regard them as "a stubborn refusal to conform", for Somalis themselves their social exclusion "is experienced by Somalis as a constraint on their ability to engage both with their community living in the diaspora and, most importantly, with Somalis living in the country of origin".

=== Social integration, crime and terrorism ===
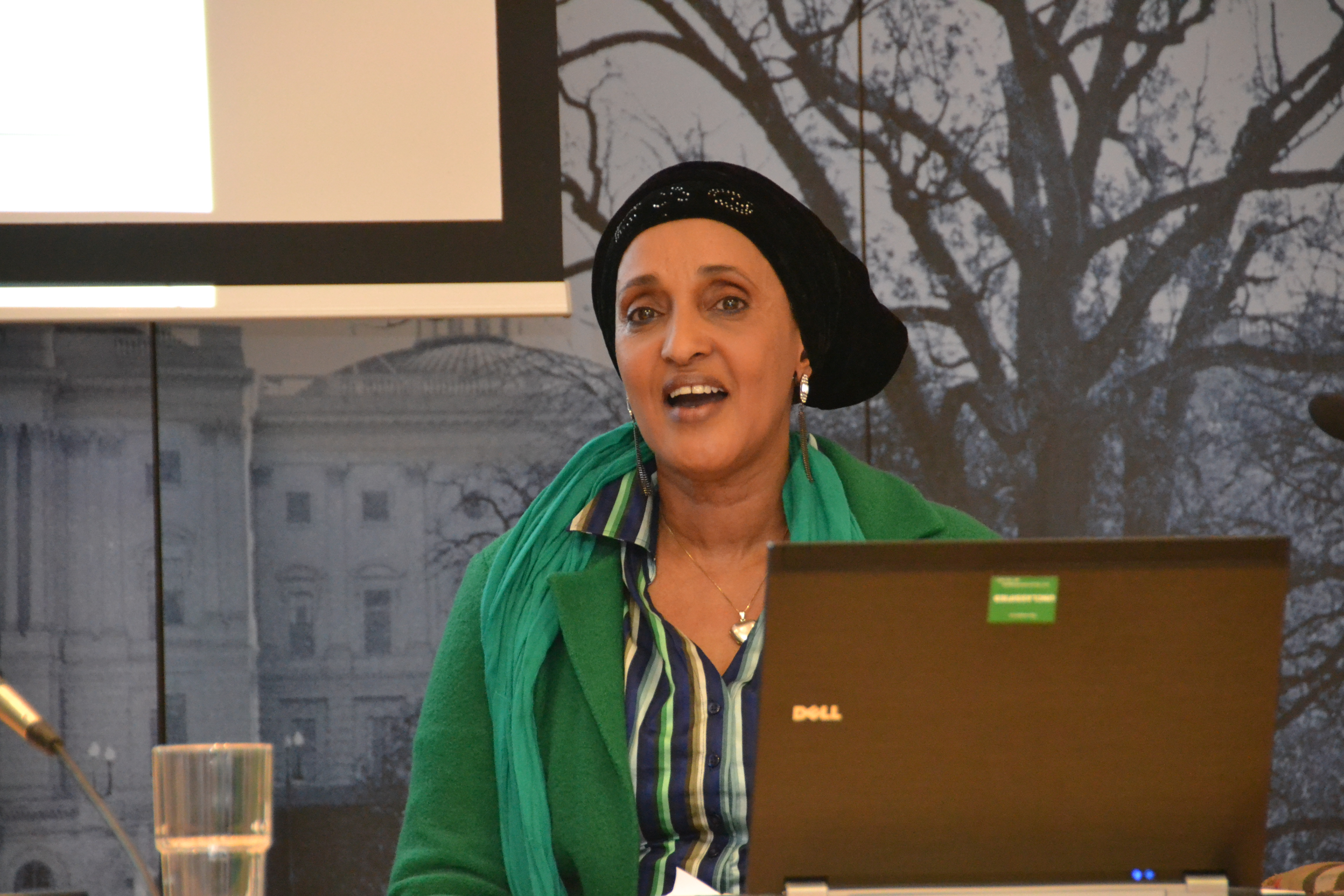
Somali activist Hanan Ibrahim, Chairperson of the Barnet Muslim Women's Network.

One of the main barriers to integration facing Somalis is insufficient English language skills, which has an effect on housing and health conditions. The issue of youth crime and gang violence within the Somali community is often covered in the media.

Somalis are overrepresented among criminal offences relative to their proportion of the British population and are among the top 10 nationalities for criminals convicted under terrorism-related offences in the United Kingdom. Somalis have one of the highest rates of imprisonment of any nationality present in the United Kingdom. 100 out of every 10,000 Somali residents of the United Kingdom is in prison, the eighth highest rate of any national group in the United Kingdom.

According to a 2009 report in The Times, “The most destabilising by-product of the large-scale Somali migration to Britain has been the propensity of a significant number of young Somali men to become involved in crime and to use violence.” According to The Times, “Between 2017 and 2019, 26 young British-Somalis died in knife attacks and violent crime, according to evidence submitted to parliament by the London Somali Youth Forum.” In a report issued by the Council of Somali Organisations in 2016, “The available evidence has indicated that the most common offences committed by Somali young people are robbery and violent and drug-related offences”

In October 2021, British MP Sir David Amess was murdered in his constituency surgery by Ali Harba Ali, a British-Somali man and Islamic State sympathiser. Ali stabbed the victim multiple times with a knife in front of a crowd.

According to the Metropolitan Police, “Violence among Somali youths is a growing problem”, especially in parts of Tower Hamlets, London. The Standard reports that “Somali gangs are an emerging force in the East End though they are not as powerful as the Asian gangs which control entire areas and are believed to run the heroin trade.”

In response, community youth forums have been established, which work closely with law enforcement to deter criminality. Women's groups have also started to form, and the Metropolitan Police hired its first Somali female officer in 2009. Additionally, the Somali Youth Development Resource Centre (SYDRC), a Somali community-reach organisation based in Camden, has joined forces with the Metropolitan Police's Communities Together Strategic Engagement Team to establish the London Somali Youth Forum. The initiative provides an outlet for the city's young Somalis to address security-related issues and to get engaged with the local police. The SYDRC has hired numerous youth ambassadors for the purpose. As of December 2009, 16 young Somalis had been specifically trained in community engagement. According to Abdikadir Ahmed of the Somali Youth Development Resource Centre in Camden, which encourages young Somalis to use the entrepreneurial skills they have learnt in gangs for more productive purposes and which works with Somalis in Feltham Young Offenders Institution, the number of young Somalis who are imprisoned has been falling. The Economist reports that few Somalis were involved in the 2011 summer riots. In March 2019, it was reported that some Somali mothers in London were sending their sons back to Somalia, Somaliland and Kenya to avoid them becoming involved in knife crime.

=== Employment ===
According to the 2021 United Kingdom Census, 47.1% of all Somalis in Britain were ‘economically inactive’, a term referring to individuals not in education, employment or training and who are not seeking employment. This compares to 24.7% of the overall population of England and Wales.

=== Housing ===
According to research, in the mid-2000s, over 95 per cent of Somali immigrants in the UK lived in rental accommodation and of this group, about 80 per cent lived in social housing. This representation is numerically very small in relation to the total number of social tenants in the UK; according to analysis of the Labour Force Survey, in 2007, 72,800 of the 92,200-person Somalia-born community were residing in social housing compared to 8.4 million UK-born social tenants.

According to the 2021 census, of those usual residents of England and Wales who identified as Somali, 72.0% lived in social rented housing, which is more than four times higher that the population as a whole (16.6%).

Factors that account for the high uptake of social housing in the community include generally lower household incomes that make it difficult to buy property; a preference for living in London, where property prices are higher and there are proportionately more social tenants from all communities; and a high proportion of new arrivals in the Somali community, with newcomers least likely to have gathered the savings that are required to buy property. Another contributing factor is the proportionately larger family sizes for which to find affordable and appropriate accommodation; about 10.8 per cent of Somalia-born households have five or more children as compared to 0.3 per cent of the UK-born population. Foreign-born populations in general tend to have larger families than the UK-born average.

Most Somalia-born immigrants are eligible for social housing, as they have either refugee status, settled status or citizenship of the UK or another European Economic Area (EEA) state. Social housing and support for asylum seekers is allocated by the Home Office.

=== Educational achievement ===
Commentators and policymakers have expressed concern about the poor educational performance of Somali pupils in British schools. No nationwide statistics are available on the number and educational attainment of Somali pupils in the UK. This is because "Somali" is not a tick-box option in official ethnicity classifications. Consequently, Somali students are often aggregated into a broader "Black African" category in pupil performance data. Some local education authorities in England make use of so-called "extended ethnicity codes" in order to capture data on more specific groups of pupils, including Somalis. Collating data from local authorities that collect this data, the Institute for Public Policy Research has published statistics on GCSE performance by extended ethnicity code. According to these statistics, in the school year 2010–11, the proportion of Somali pupils being awarded five or more GCSEs at grades A* to C, including in mathematics and English, was 23.7 percentage points below the average for all groups of 56.9 per cent. Feyisa Demie of the London Borough of Lambeth's Research and Statistics Unit has used language spoken at home as a proxy for ethnicity, using language data on pupils whose first language is not English, which has been collected in England since 2007. His analysis shows that of the 2,748 pupils classified as Black African and speaking Somali at home taking GCSEs in 2012, 47 per cent gained five or more A*-C grades, compared to 58 per cent of all Black African students and a national average for all pupils of 59 per cent.

Demie and colleagues have also analysed data from London local authorities that use extended ethnicity codes. They note that "evidence in London shows a pattern of continuous underachievement of Somali children compared to the national average of White British, African, Caribbean, Indian and other ethnic minority groups", and that Somalis pupils are the lowest attaining group at Key Stage 2, Key Stage 3 and GCSE level in a number of local authorities. They present an average figure for 10 London local authorities, showing that only 34 per cent of Somali pupils gained five or more A*-C GCSEs in 2006. The average for Somalis in schools in 28 London local authorities was 43 per cent. There was marked variation in these pupils' performance across London. In one local authority, no Somali pupils were awarded five GCSEs at grades A*-C, but in five other local authorities, the proportion achieving this benchmark was between 52 per cent and 69 per cent.

A number of explanations have been offered for the relatively poor performance of Somali pupils in British schools. These include the fact that many Somalis enter the British education system late due to their arrival as refugees and have had their education interrupted, stereotyping and a lack of cultural awareness on the part of school staff, an inability of parents to offer sufficient support due to lack of knowledge of the system and lack of maternal literacy, poverty and overcrowding in Somali homes, and a lack of role models. Lack of English language ability is a key factor. In the London Borough of Lambeth, around 87 per cent of Somali pupils are not fluent in English.

Significant improvements in the performance of Somali pupils have been observed in some London boroughs. In September 2000, Somali community groups in conjunction with Camden Council, police and the voluntary sector established the Somali Youth Development Resource Centre in order to provide advice, information and activities for Somali youngsters, with the aim of promoting educational achievement, after only one Somali pupil gained five good GCSEs in the borough that year. The centre is credited with helping significantly improve Somalis' GCSE performance. The Camden and Tower Hamlets local authorities reported that the performance of their Somali pupils was comparable with the overall student population in those boroughs in the school year 2011–12.

=== Health and social services ===
Academic research has shown that British Somalis' ability to access healthcare "can be restricted through health service institutions' difficulties in recognising their linguistic and cultural diversity and is limited by combined wider social, political and economic effects".

Due to uncertainty over what services are available under the National Health Service, how to access that care, and what to expect it from it, Somalis in the Manchester area reportedly often seek medical treatment in Germany. The German healthcare system was perceived by them as being very professional and responsive, with rapid access to specialist care and modern scanning technology. German doctors have also advertised on Somali television for many years, and this has developed as the main medical tourism route for the Somali communities. Research conducted with Somali health workers in London has also shown that many Somali women have bad experiences of giving birth in the UK. This can be the result of the mismanagement of care relating to female circumcision during both pregnancy and labour. The respondents also reported that, in addressing communication barriers, the importance of oral culture amongst Somalis is not sufficiently recognised. Furthermore, Somali women felt that the attitudes of midwives towards them were stereotyped and negative. Other research has shown that there is a perceived failure of social services to work with the Somali community in London, and that there is growing mistrust of the motives of social services.

Reporting about the COVID-19 pandemic in April 2020, the BBC stated that the pandemic "has hit the Somali community hard in both economic and human terms", with those dying of the disease including "a disproportionate number of Somalis". A June 2020 report in the Financial Times noted that Somalis had been disproportionately impacted by the pandemic, though "[p]recisely how many have died is difficult to ascertain because Somalis do not yet feature as a separate ethnic identity in official UK statistics".

=== Female genital mutilation ===
Female genital mutilation (FGM) is commonplace in Somalia (typically in the form of infibulation) but is illegal in the UK. UNICEF estimates that 98 per cent of girls and women aged 15 to 49 in Somalia have experienced FGM. Three doctors working at Northwick Park Hospital in London, where a significant proportion of African women giving birth were Somali, warned in 1995 that due to growing Somali and Sudanese migrant populations, "the problem of caring for infibulated women will be faced by most midwives and obstetricians at some stage". Also in 1995, Black and Debelle noted in the British Medical Journal "evidence that the operation is being performed illegally in Britain...by medically qualified or unqualified practitioners and that children are being sent abroad for a 'holiday' to have it done". This latter practice continues, with children regularly taken to Somalia or Kenya in the school summer holidays for FGM to be undertaken. Estimates published in July 2014 suggest that the vast majority of Somali-born women in Britain have undergone FGM. The report, by Alison Macfarlane and Efua Dorkenoo, notes that some members of migrant groups continue to support FGM once in the UK, although younger generations are most likely to be opposed to it. A study published in 2004, based on research with a sample of young Somalis in London, found that 70 per cent of the females reported having been circumcised, two-thirds of these by infibulation. Of those who were already living in Britain before the usual age of FGM being performed, only 42 per cent had undergone the practice, whereas amongst those who moved to the UK after this age, the proportion was 91 per cent. The study also found that these younger people reported having less traditional views on FGM than their parents. 18 per cent of the female respondents and 43 of the males said that they intended to circumcise any daughters that they had. Some Somali women in the UK, particularly of younger generations, have spoken out publicly and campaigned against the practice.

Research conducted by academics from the University of Bristol and Cardiff University in 2018 found that the Somalis included in the study were committed to the ending of FGM practices, but they felt traumatised and victimised by FGM safeguarding policies. The researchers noted that Somalis "felt distrusted, their intentions suspected and their needs ignored. There was a sense that the whole Somali community was unfairly targeted and had become a 'suspect community'...: a group considered by the state to be suspicious despite there being no evidence of criminal involvement. Participants also described FGM-safeguarding policy as inherently racist and gave examples of how wider debates on FGM directly contributed to experiences of racist violence from the public".

=== Khat use ===
Khat is a plant that is mainly grown in East Africa and the Middle East. Its leaves are chewed for their stimulating properties, primarily by people from these regions. Within Somali culture especially, khat chewing has a long history as a social custom that traditionally brings people together to relax and to encourage conversation. Some people also use it to help them stay alert during work or school. Ordinarily, khat use would be limited to specific periods of the day and session durations. A 2007 source reports that khat was readily available at that time in mafrishes, commercial establishments where the substance was sold and chewed. Within the Somali community as well as other groups with khat-chewing traditions, the activity was generally perceived as legitimate and not censured like alcohol and illegal drug use are within those same communities. In June 2014, khat use was made illegal in the UK.

Prior to the ban, some commentators, health professionals and community members expressed concerns about the long-term effects of the use of khat by Somalis in the UK, suggesting that excessive use has a negative social and health impact on the community. One review of studies of the effects of khat use by Somalis and other immigrants on their mental health suggested that there was a need for better research on khat-chewing and its possible link with psychiatric disorders; it also suggested that public discourse on the issue displayed elements of a moral panic. Some Somali community organisations also campaigned for khat to be banned. As a result of these concerns, the Home Office commissioned successive research studies to look into the matter, and in 2005, presented the question of khat's legal status before the Advisory Council on the Misuse of Drugs. After a careful review of the evidence, the expert committee recommended in January 2006 that the status of khat as a legal substance should remain for the time being.

In 2005, the Home Office issued a report on research examining the level and nature of the use of khat by Somalis in four English cities; Birmingham, Bristol, London and Sheffield. It found that 38 per cent of the respondents had ever used khat in their lifetime, with 58 per cent of men and only 16 per cent of women reporting having ever used it. 34 per cent of the overall sample indicated that they had chewed khat the month before, with 51 per cent all men in the study and 14 per cent of the women having done so. Some reported family tensions arising from their khat use. 49 per cent of those surveyed were in favour of banning khat, with 35 opposed, but the report suggested that this would not be effective. Three-quarters of participants who had used khat reported having suffered health effects, although these were mostly mild in nature, with the most common symptoms respondents associated with khat use being sleeping difficulties, loss of appetite, and an urge to chew more khat. The study concluded that most of the participants who were using khat were using it moderately in terms of both the quantity used and the frequency and duration of chewing sessions, and that khat use was typically a social activity. Only a small minority of the study participants' khat use was judged to be excessive. In January 2013, the Advisory Council on the Misuse of Drugs also again cited insufficient evidence that the plant caused serious health or societal problems to warrant governmental control.

In 2008, Conservative politician Sayeeda Warsi stated that a future Conservative government would ban khat. Following lobbying by Somali community groups, in July 2013 it was announced that khat was to be classified as a class C drug and therefore banned. Khat was officially made illegal in the UK in June 2014. This move was welcomed by some Somali groups, and the Home Office minister responsible for overseeing the ban stated: "We took the decision based on the strong views of the Somali community, particularly the mums and wives. They felt that khat was stopping the Somali community from integrating; it was distracting the husbands and sons from getting the education and the jobs that their wives and mothers desperately wanted them to get". Criticising the ban, House of Commons Home Affairs Select Committee stated that it "was based not on any evidence of medical or social harm caused by its consumption, but by a desire to avoid the UK becoming a hub for the illegal importation of khat into other EU countries".

=== Forced marriage ===
According to data published by the British government's Forced Marriage Unit (FMU), a joint effort between the Home Office and the Foreign and Commonwealth Office, of the 91 cases that related to Somalia in 2017, 71.4 per cent involved victims who were female and 28.6 per cent male, 25.3 per cent were under the age of 15 and another 29.7 per cent were aged 16–17. Approximately 75 per cent of the victims were already overseas when they contacted the FMU. The number of cases relating to Somalia reported to the FMU in 2017 was more than twice the number recorded in 2016. The 91 cases represented 7.6 per cent of all cases referred to the FMU, where Somalia had the third highest number of cases after Pakistan and Bangladesh.

== Community ==
=== Community organisations ===
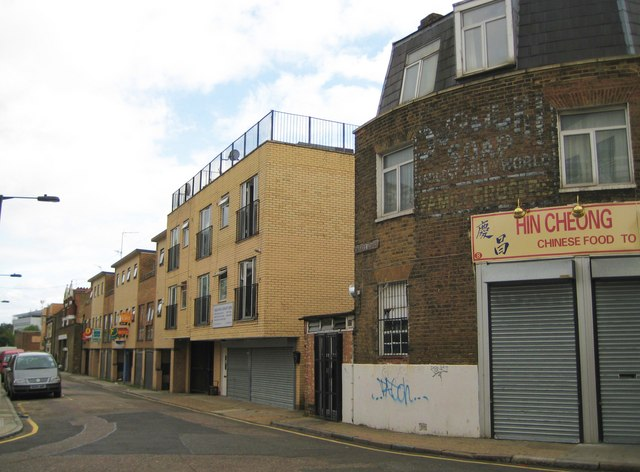
A Somali community centre in London's East End (yellow brick building in the middle).

In 2011, the Council of Somali Organisations (CSO) was established to collectively represent Somali community institutions, to coordinate their activities, and improve their operational effectiveness. Prior to the establishment of the CSO, research had shown that the lack of a central organisation of Somalis enabling them to voice opinions had rendered them invisible to many policymakers. Somalis in London tend to exist in small communities that are scattered across the capital. Researchers have contrasted this with the British Bangladeshi community, which is more concentrated and, it is argued, therefore has a greater capacity to express a "common voice". Research by the Shire Foundation has identified 131 Somali community organisations in London. Based on interviews with Somali women refugees in London, academic Gail Hopkins argued in 2006 that Somalis were poorly represented by existing black and minority ethnic (BME) organisations, and notes that her interviewees saw themselves as more closely aligned with Arab populations than with Africans and African-Caribbeans. Somalis feel that they are regarded as part of the BME population, but that BME organisations are unaware of their particular needs as a community. Hopkins's interviewees were concerned about the ability of specifically Somali organisations to represent the community, due to clan tensions amongst Somalis. As of February 2012, the CSO represented 30 individual Somali organisations. It took four years to set up the umbrella organisation, and this has been attributed in part to a cultural suspicion of hierarchy. A previous Somali umbrella organisation, the Somali London Community Cultural Association, was formed in the 1970s but collapsed in 1995.

The Anti-Tribalism Movement (ATM) was established in London in 2010, with the aim of combatting clan-based discrimination in Britain and in Somalia. In 2011, Reuters reported that the organisation claimed to have 53,000 followers, most of them based in Somalia. As of 2015, the ATM claims to have 130,000 members worldwide.

=== Involvement in politics ===
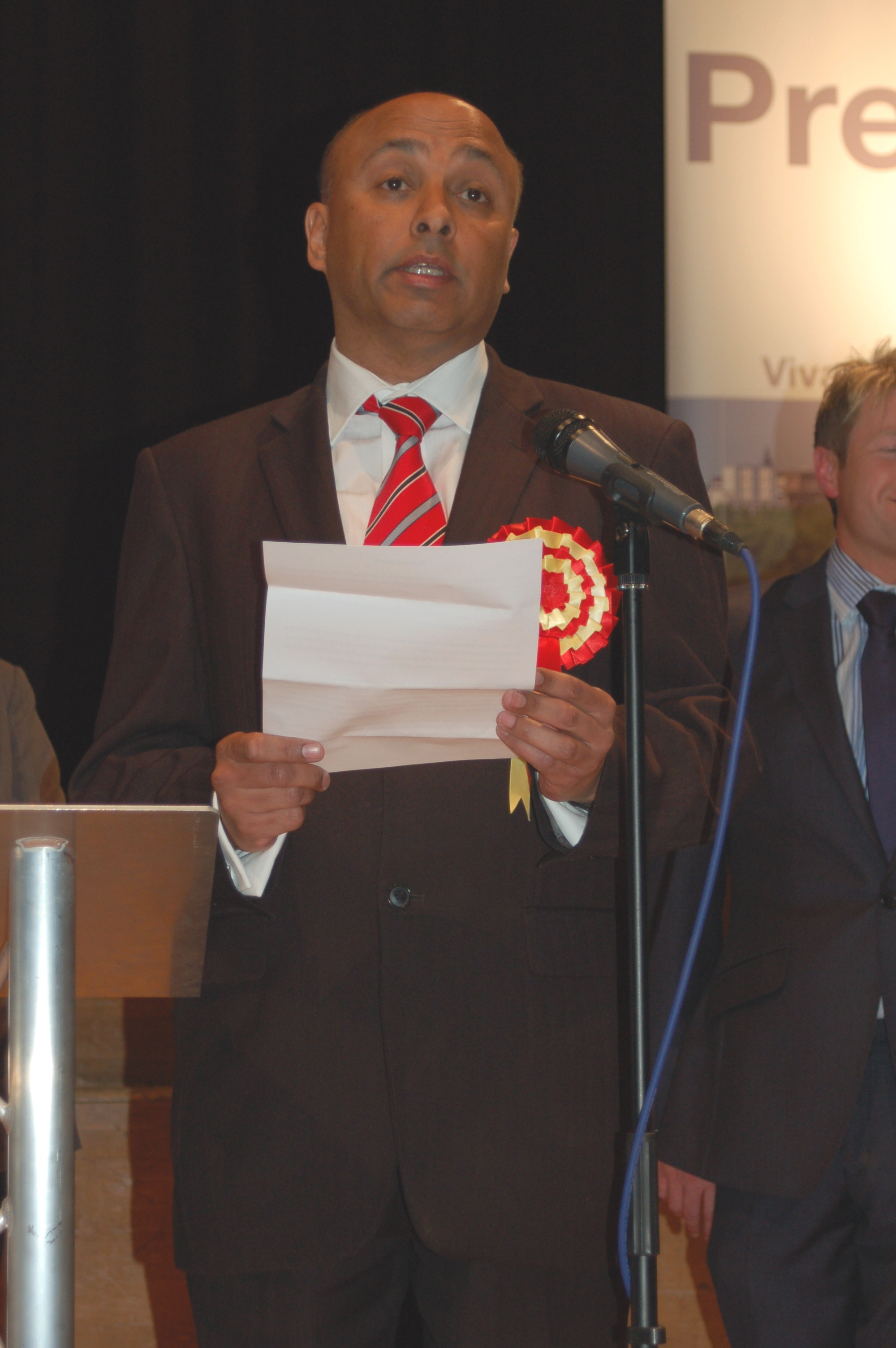
Mark Hendrick serves as a Member of Parliament for Preston and a member of the Foreign Affairs Select Committee.

Mark Hendrick, who is of Anglo-Somali descent, previously served as a member of the European Parliament before being elected a Labour Co-operative Member of Parliament for Preston in a by-election in 2000.

The Somali community has become increasingly engaged in local politics. Mohamed "Jimmy" Ali became the UK's first Somali councillor in 2004. Councillor Ahmed Omer, who was the civic mayor of Tower Hamlets in 2009/10 (a largely ceremonial post made by appointment rather than through direct election), was the first Somali to be appointed to the annual position in London and England. Around 17 Somali candidates stood in the 2010 local elections. Of these, at least seven Somali councillors were elected, including Gulaid Abdullah Ahmed, Abdifatah Aden, Awale Olad, and Abdul Mohamed of the Labour Party, as well as Asad Osman of the Liberal Democrats, a former chairman of the Somali Youth Development Resource Centre. In the 2014 local elections, nine Somali councillors were also elected to office. Among the officials was Hibaq Jama, a Labour Party Ward Councillor for Lawrence Hill, who is Bristol's first Somali woman councillor, as well as Amina Ali, a Labour Party Ward Councillor for Tower Hamlets, who in February 2015 became the first Somali woman to be selected to contest a seat in the Parliament of the United Kingdom. Ali was chosen from a shortlist of three women but resigned three days later, indicating that she did not want to disrupt her children's upbringing by moving residences. For the 2015 elections, Somali community activists in Bristol set up a taskforce to encourage British Somalis to vote. In 2018, former Somali refugee Magid Magid was appointed as Lord Mayor of Sheffield, a ceremonial position held by a member of the city council. Magid was elected as a Green Party councillor for Broomhill and Sharrow Vale in 2016.

Amina Ali argues that Somali women have brought a "strong sense of political participation and activism" with them to Britain, rooted in a tradition of female engagement in politics in Somalia. In the UK, she argues that they find themselves excluded from the political process. Early Somali community groups, Ali states, were often headed by women and it was these groups that often introduced Somali women to British politics and "pointed them in the direction of the Labour party as the party for 'people like us to vote for'". She argues that despite this party loyalty, Labour has taken the Somali vote for granted and not engaged with or sought to understand the needs of the Somali community. She complains that Labour MPs in constituencies with large Somali populations have wrongly assumed that since the community is Muslim, they should engage with male community members only, and that even Somali men complain about a lack of engagement. In the run-up to the 2015 general election, Ali argued that Labour MPs in marginal constituencies "are slowly coming to the realisation that the Somali vote matters".

=== Transnational activism ===
Academic Laura Hammond argues that the Somali British community's transnational activism responded effectively to the 2011 drought in East Africa, with members quickly mobilizing resources in the form of increased remittances to support family members in Somalia. They also pooled funds to support NGOs working in camps for displaced persons in Mogadishu, Ethiopia and Kenya. A survey conducted by Hammond in South-Central Somalia also found that 68.2 per cent of providers of social services there were returnees.

In February 2012, the British government held a consultation with representatives of the UK's Somali diaspora based around the London Somalia Conference's three main themes of political transition, security and the role of Somalia's regions. The summit was held later the same month in conjunction with the Federal Government of Somalia. Additionally, Somalis with dual Somali-British citizenship have significantly contributed to the reconstruction process in Somalia, particularly to the nation's reconstituted political system. As of 2017, 29 of the 275 Members of the Federal Parliament of Somalia held British passports. In June 2014, Somalia's foreign minister, Abdirahman Duale Beyle, called on members of the Somali diaspora in the UK to return home to help rebuild the country.

== Business and enterprise ==
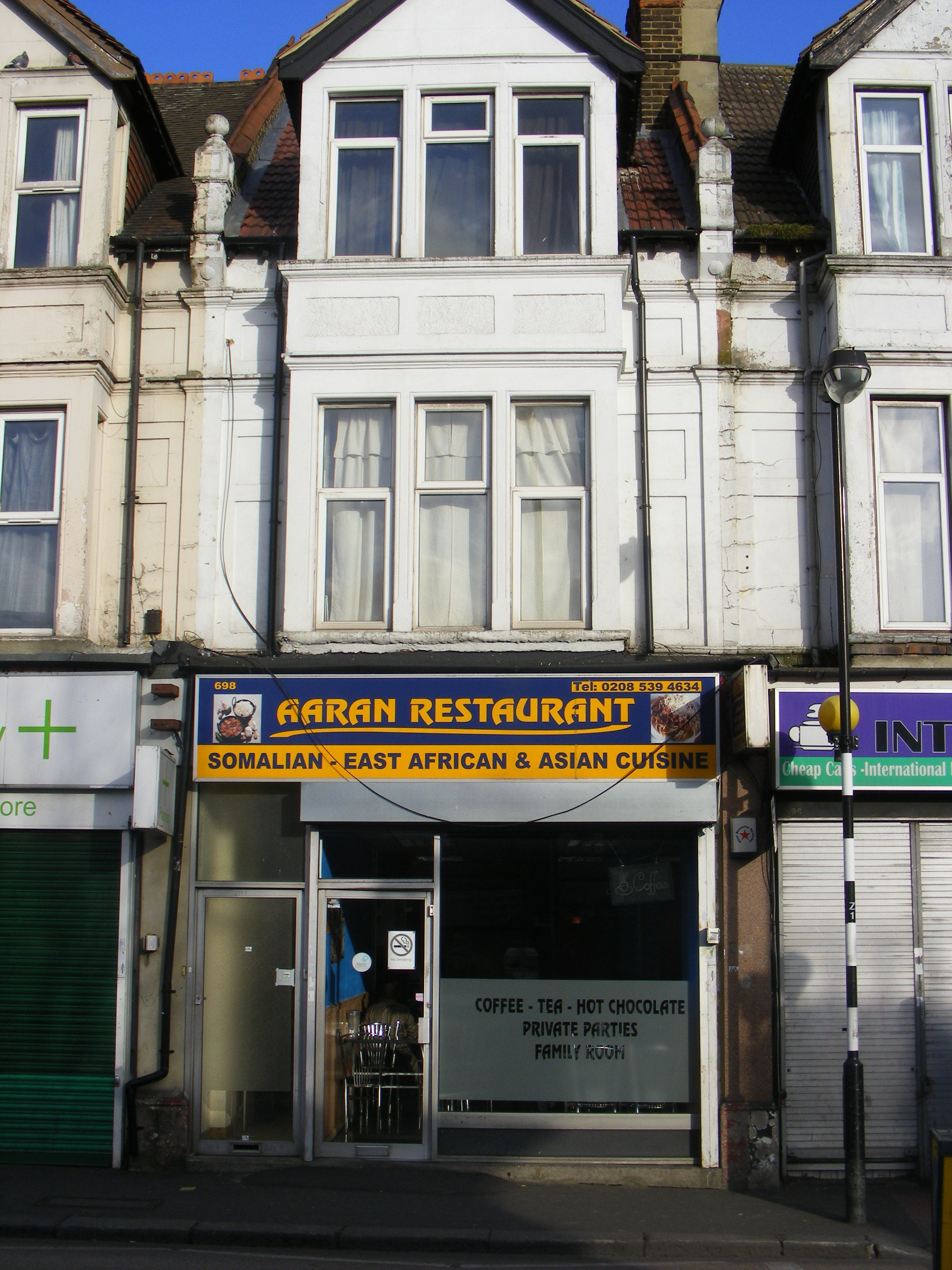
A Somali restaurant in the London Borough of Waltham Forest.

Somalis have a strong tradition in trade, with a long history of maritime enterprise stretching back to antiquity that includes possible commerce with ancient Britons based on rare commodities such as tin. In recent times, several Somali multinational companies have their headquarters in the UK, such as Omar A. Ali's Integrated Property Investments Limited, Alexander Yusuf's Villa and Mansion Architects, and Invicta Capital, which has an investment capital of £1.4 billion. A 2008 study on immigrant business in Britain highlighted that the level of community support enjoyed by Somali traders was high in comparison to other immigrant groups. In some areas, Somali enterprise has also begun replacing previously Indian-dominated business premises. Southall, for example, now features several Somali-oriented restaurants and cafés. Successful middle-class Somalis tend to often be northerners from Somaliland, and have had time to establish themselves in the country as they descend from earlier generation of immigrants.

A study on Somali business owners in Leicester found that they were highly motivated and wielded substantial social capital. The researchers suggested that this in turn made it easier for the entrepreneurs to establish themselves in the area, hire personnel, exchange information regarding local business opportunities, and pool funds. They argued that this was contingent upon under-capitalization, market barriers and related spatial and sectoral restrictions. Consequently, the Somali establishments followed what they posited was the standard ethnic minority business paradigm of being mainly concentrated in very competitive markets, with finite return on investment and uncertain durability.

=== Networks ===
The Somali diaspora is inter-connected via information exchange and informal money transfer systems. Somalis in the UK operates various business networks, with the Somaliland Chamber of Commerce having an office locally. Another Somali business network, the Midlands Somali Business Association, a non-profit organisation centered in Birmingham, offers commercial advice to Somali businesses based in the city. It also publishes a quarterly newsletter and runs workshops and conferences for the local Somali business community. Additionally, the number of Somali businesses in the UK is increasing, ranging from restaurants, remittance companies, hairdressing salons and travel agencies to, especially, internet cafés. Although some of these businesses cater to mainstream British society, most are aimed at a Somali clientele. The Midlands Somali Business Association has recognised the potential benefits of penetrating the larger British business community, and is encouraging stakeholders to tap into this sector. The organisation is also exploring opportunities for transnational businesses.

In 2014, the Fiiri Bandhiga entrepreneurial convention was also launched in London to showcase young Somali-owned businesses in the UK.

=== Money transfer operators ===
Dahabshiil

Some Somali businesses with a presence in the UK, particularly in the remittance sector, already operate internationally. The latter include Dahabshiil, Qaran Express, Mustaqbal, Amal Express, Kaah Express, Hodan Global, Olympic, Amana Express, Iftin Express and Tawakal Express. Most are credentialed members of the Somali Money Transfer Association (SOMTA) (or its predecessor, the Somali Financial Services Association (SFSA)), an umbrella organisation that regulates the community's money transfer sector. The bulk of remittances are sent by Somalis to relatives in Somalia, a practice which has had a stimulating effect on that country's economy.

Dahabshiil is the largest of the Somali money transfer operators (MTO), having captured most of the market vacated by Al-Barakaat. The firm has its headquarters in London and employs more than 2000 people across 144 countries, with 130 branches in the UK alone, a further 130 branches in Somalia, and 400 branches globally, including one in Dubai. It invests 5 per cent of its profits into community projects aimed at improving schools, hospitals, agriculture and sanitation services, and sponsors a number of social events, including the Somali Week Festival and the Somali Youth Sports Association, which help to promote understanding and cooperation through Somali art and culture and sport, respectively. In 2008, Dahabshiil's CEO, Abdirashid Duale, a Somali who has British citizenship, was awarded Top Manager of the Year by the International Association of Money Transfer Networks in recognition of the services the firm offers its clients. This was followed in 2010 with the Mayor of Tower Hamlets award for excellence in the community, which recognises the "outstanding contribution" Dahabshiil has made to the local, national and international Somali community over the last 40 years.

After Dahabshiil, Qaran Express is the largest Somali-owned funds transfer company. The firm has its headquarters in both London and Dubai, with 175 agents worldwide, 64 agents in London and 66 in Somalia, and charges nothing for remitting charity funds. Mustaqbal is the third most prominent Somali MTO with branches in the UK, having 49 agents in the UK and 8 agents in Somalia.

== Notable people ==
- See List of British Somalis

== See also ==
- Somali diaspora
- Somalia-United Kingdom relations

== Sources ==
- "Becoming visible: The Somali community and substance use in London" (PDF). Adfam. 2009.
- Abdullahi, Mohamed Diriye (2001). Culture and Customs of Somalia. Greenwood Press. ISBN 978-0-313-31333-2.
- Black, J.A.; Debelle, G.D. (1995). "Female genital mutilation in Britain". British Medical Journal. 310 (6994): 1590–1592. doi:10.1136/bmj.310.6994.1590. PMC 2549951. PMID 7787654.
- "2011 Census Analysis: How do Living Arrangements, Family Type and Family Size Vary in England and Wales?" (PDF). Office for National Statistics. 24 June 2014.
- Demie, Feyisa; Lewis, Kirstin; McLean, Christabel (March 2008). "Raising Achievement of Somali Pupils: Good Practice in London Schools" (PDF). Lambeth Research and Statistics Unit.
- "Final recommended questions for the 2011 Census in England and Wales: Ethnic group" (PDF). Office for National Statistics. October 2009.
- Harris, Hermione (June 2004). The Somali community in the UK: What we know and how we know it (PDF). London: Information Centre about Asylum and Refugees (ICAR). ISBN 0-9547024-4-1.
- Hopkins, Gail (2006). "Somali community organizations in London and Toronto: Collaboration and effectiveness". Journal of Refugee Studies. 19 (3): 361–380. doi:10.1093/jrs/fel013.
- Khan, Saber; Jones, Adrian (2002). "Somalis in Camden: challenges faced by an emerging community". London Borough of Camden.
- Kleist, Nauja (2004). "Nomads, sailors and refugees: A century of Somali migration" (PDF). Sussex Migration Working Paper. 23. Sussex Centre for Migration Research, University of Sussex.
- Macfarlane, Alison; Dorkenoo, Efua (21 July 2014). "Female Genital Mutilation in England and Wales: Updated statistical estimates of the numbers of affected women living in England and Wales and girls at risk – Interim report on provisional estimates" (PDF). City University London and Equality Now. Archived from the original (PDF) on 17 May 2017.
- McCaffrey, M.; Jankowska, A.; Gordon, H. (1995). "Management of female genital mutilation: the Northwick Park Hospital experience". British Journal of Obstetrics and Gynaecology. 102 (10): 787–790. doi:10.1111/j.1471-0528.1995.tb10843.x. PMID 7547734. S2CID 21558470.
- "Somali regions: Mapping exercise" (PDF). London: International Organization for Migration. June 2006. Archived from the original (PDF) on 16 July 2011.
- "Somalis in London" (PDF). Open Society Foundations. 2014.
- "The Somali Muslim Community in England: Understanding Muslim Ethnic Communities" (PDF). Department for Communities and Local Government. April 2009. Archived from the original (PDF) on 19 September 2012.
- "The Somali Refugee Community in the UK" (PDF). ICAR briefing. London: Information Centre about Asylum and Refugees. July 2007. p. 4. Archived from the original (PDF) on 14 June 2015.
- Rutter, Jill (2006). Refugee Children in the UK. Maidenhead: Open University Press. ISBN 978-0335213740.
- Rutter, Jill (2012). "Equity in Education for Migrant and Refugee Children: Issues from the United Kingdom". In McCarthy, Florence E.; Vickers, Margaret Heather (eds.). Refugee and Immigrant Students: Achieving Equity in Education. Charlotte, NC: Information Age Publishing. pp. 167–188. ISBN 978-1617358418.
- Rutter, Jill (March 2013). "Back to basics: Towards a successful and cost-effective integration policy" (PDF). Institute for Public Policy Research.
- Rutter, Jill (2015). Moving Up and Getting On: Migration, integration and social cohesion in the UK. Bristol: Policy Press. ISBN 978-1447314615.
- Rutter, Jill; Latorre, Maria (Spring 2009). "Social housing allocation and immigrant communities" (PDF). Equality and Human Rights Commission.
- Straus, Lianne; McEwen, Andy; Mohamed Hussein, Faduma (2009). "Somali women's experience of childbirth in the UK: Perspectives from Somali health workers". Midwifery. 25 (2): 181–186. doi:10.1016/j.midw.2007.02.002. PMID 17600598.
- Toms, Hannah; Thorpe, Katharine (2012). "Practical Measures for Reducing Irregular Migration" (PDF). Home Office. pp. 3 & 78.
- Williams, Mike (2018). "Working with a community to prevent child sexual abuse in the home" (PDF). NSPCC.
