= Adam Matan =

Somali-British civil society leader and social activist

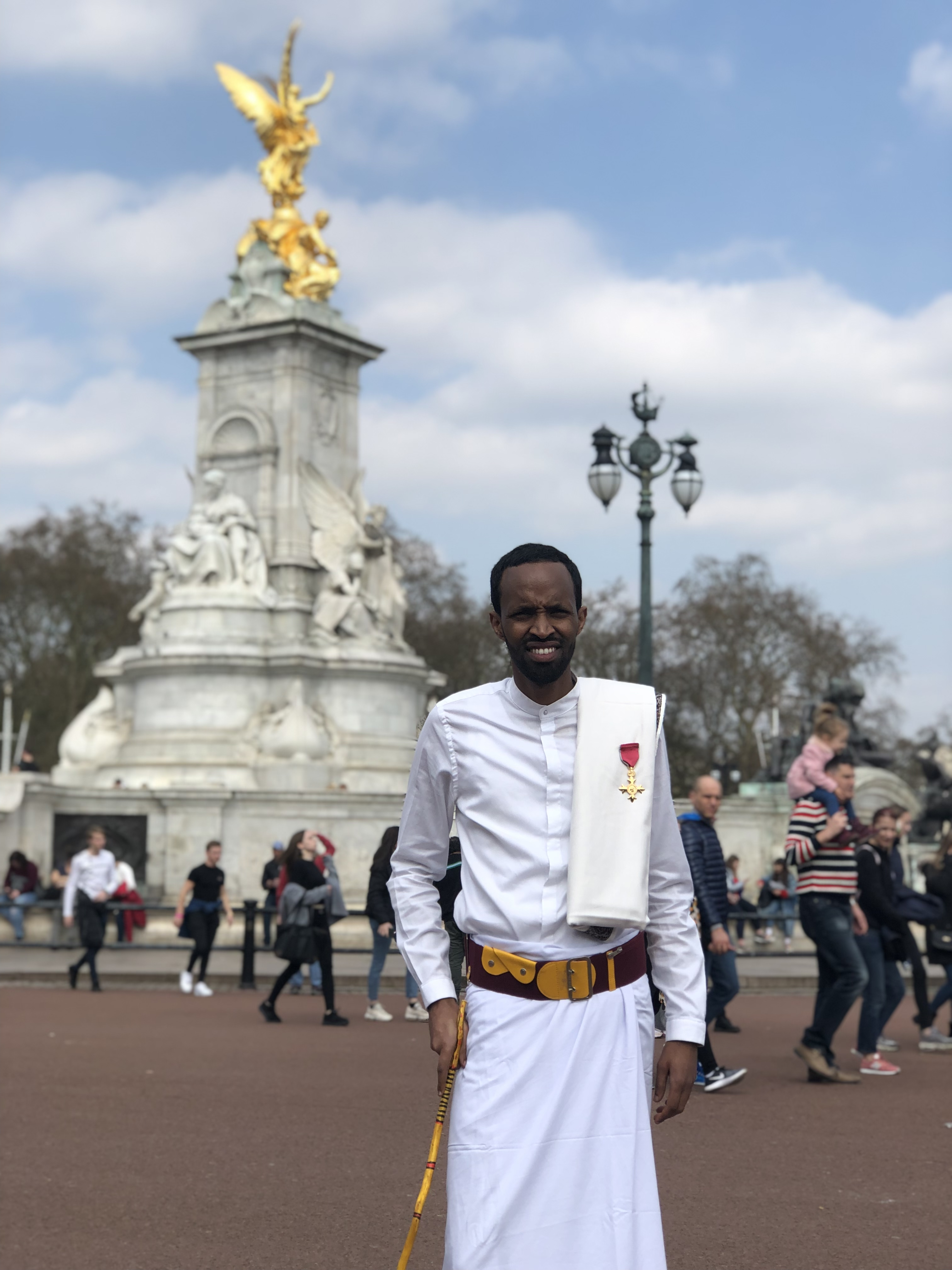

Adam Matan OBE (Somali Adan Mataan) (Arabic: آدم متان) is a Somali-British civil society leader and social activist. He is the former Director of the Anti-Tribalism Movement, a non-profit organisation established in 2010 to combat tribalism and inequality amongst the British-Somali community. In 2019, he became the first British-Somali to be appointed an OBE for "services to the Somali community in the UK and wider British-Somali relations".

== Personal life ==
Matan came to the United-Kingdom as a teenager following the Somali Civil War. He lives in London and holds a PgDip in Law and Leadership from SOAS University of London and an LLM in International Minority Rights Law from Middlesex University.

== Career ==
Matan was the director of Anti-Tribalism Movement for over 10 years —a charity established in 2010 in the United Kingdom to combat tribalism within the Somali community following the Somali Civil War. He is a former One Young World Ambassador and has advised the British government about the Somali community. He has participated in a number of high-level engagements connecting the British and Somali government such as the London-Somali Conference 2012 and 2017. He participated in a successful UK-wide campaign to save vital remittances in 2017. He also serves as Trustee on two charitable boards (Hammersmith United Charities and Trust for London) as well as chairing the Independent Policing and Crime Commission for Hammersmith and Fulham which published an independent-resident led report in 2020 assessing crime in the borough.

== Lectures, talks and conferences ==
Matan has been invited to speak at a number of events with think-tanks such as Chatham House, Global Youth Summit, Ministry of Women, Human Rights and Development Conference and many others. He featured in a documentary called Return to Somalia - documenting a trip back to Somalia along with Abdifatah Faisal. In addition to this, he was featured in the South Acton Heritage film (2014). He has published reviews for media houses such as African Arguments. Matan was also an anti-corruption panellist at the 3rd National Somali Economic Policy Forum 2019.

== Awards and achievements ==
Matan was featured in the Queen's New Year's Honours List 2019 for 'services to the Somali community in the U.K and wider- UK-Somalia relations'. and presented with the OBE medal at an investiture overseen by the HRH Prince William, Duke of Cambridge on 28 March 2019. He is the first British-Somali to be honoured with an OBE award.

He was winner of the Community Champion Award at Pride of Our People 2014.
