= Mohamed Said Duale =

Somali businessman

- Maxamed Siciid Ducaale
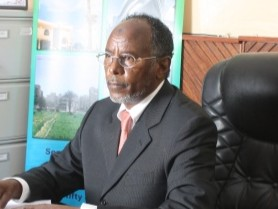
- Born: 1948 (age 77–78)
- Occupation: Businessman
- Known for: Founder of Dahabshiil
- Relatives: Abdirashid Duale (son); Muse Haji Abdi Duale (cousin)

Mohamed Said Duale (Somali: Maxamed Siciid Ducaale) is a Somali businessman. He founded the trading company Dahabshiil in 1970 and launched a money transfer business in 1988, growing it into a massive corporation.

== Biography ==
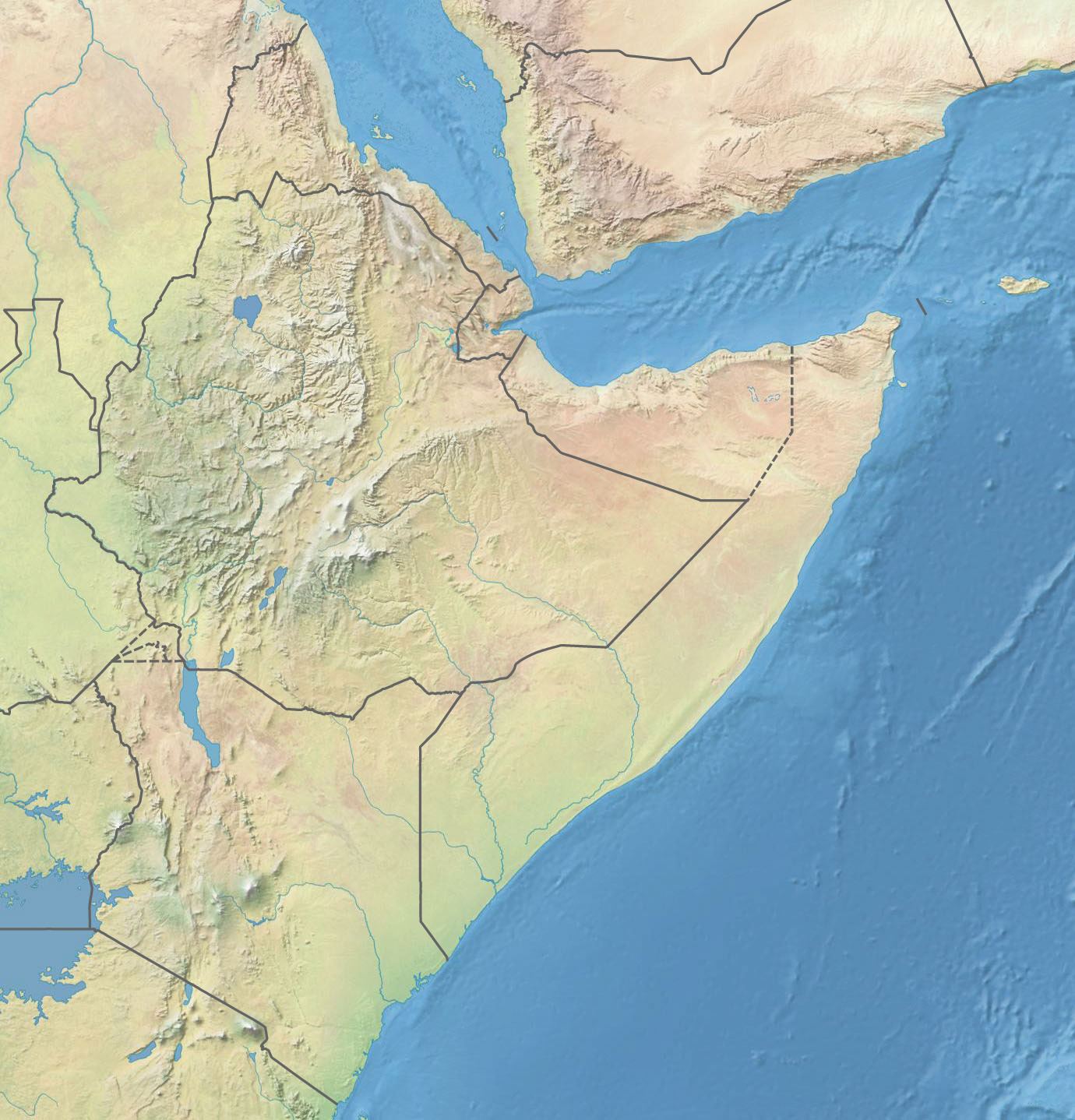
Relation map. Ji=Jijiga.

=== Early days ===
Mohamed was born around 1948 near the village of Habura, close to Gashamo. His father was a nomad. He belongs to the Sanbur sub-clan of the Isaaq clan. His father died in Yemen in 1966 while on a visit there, leaving the family in a very poor condition. Although his older brother worked in Yemen and sent money home, and the family left behind made a living through nomadic herding, Mohamed found himself in a situation where he could see no hope for the future.

In early 1967, Mohamed moved to Burao on his own and worked at a store run by a relative while attending night school. A few months later, another relative told him he wanted to entrust the store to him because he was busy expanding his livestock business, and Mohamed’s monthly salary rose to 60 Somali shillings (Approx. $10.) Even while sending money to his parents, he lived a relatively comfortable life.

=== Establishment of Dahabshiil ===
After the 1969 military coup in Somalia, 1970, Mohamed was entrusted with full responsibility for running the store by an uncle's friend with a $10,000 deposit. This is said to be the beginning of Dahabshiil. Although he was affected by economic turmoil caused by drought and restrictions imposed by the government, he expanded his business by sourcing clothing and other goods from the capital, Mogadishu, and from Aden, Yemen.

The Dabadheer, a severe drought that struck all of Somalia in the mid-1970s, dealt a devastating blow to his main customers—the nomads—and left Mohamed himself deeply in debt. In the late 1970s, Mohamed moved to the capital, Mogadishu, where he obtained a residence permit under the pretext of working as a chef for his nephew, who was employed in Dubai, and began importing and selling auto parts. This venture proved successful, and he was able to pay off his debts in full.

He returned to Burao and succeeded in securing a loan of 300,000 Somali shillings (Approx. $47,000) from a local commercial bank. After obtaining permission and a contract to import 1,000 tons of rice from a company in Bangkok, he made a huge profit. At the time, since it was impossible to take foreign currency out of Somalia, he established an informal money transfer system: he would borrow cash from Somali migrant workers in Dubai to purchase goods there, and after the goods were sold in Somalia, he would repay the workers’ families back home in Somali shillings. At that time, the staff consisted of only four people: Mohamed himself, his wife Fadumo Kahin, his eldest son Abdirashid, and his cousin Abdirahman, whom he had taught bookkeeping.

In the summer of 1987, Burao was devastated by a two-month civil war, and all five of Mohamed’s warehouses were looted, forcing him to flee to Ethiopia. As a result, he lost his entire fortune, and the only capital he had left was a mere 30,000 dirhams (Approx. $8,200) that he expected to collect from his clients in Dubai.

=== Money Transfer Business ===
In August 1988, after traveling through the Ethiopian towns of Gashamo, Harsin, and Jijiga, he arrived in Dire Dawa, a major city in eastern Ethiopia. There, he realized that many members of the diaspora wanted to send money to refugee camps in Ethiopia. He first sent the funds he had received in Dubai to Djibouti to exchange them for U.S. dollars and Djiboutian franc, and then converted them into Ethiopian birr through a network of Harari merchants and Indian money changers in Dire Dawa. Mohamed himself carried bags filled with cash to the refugee camps near the border and personally delivered the money to each person on the list of recipients.

Following the September 11 attacks in 2001, when the Somali financial company Al-Barakat was designated as a terrorist financing facilitator, Dahabshiil took over much of Al-Barakat’s business. In April 2002, Dahabshiil, following Al-Barakat, faced the threat of having its U.S. accounts closed, but ultimately avoided it.

=== Chairman ===
In 2007, Mohamed handed over the position of CEO to his son, Abdirashid. He became the company's chairman. (However, there have been reports that Abdirashid took over as CEO even before that.)

In July 2011, Mohamed announced that he would make a donation to the Dadaab refugee camp in Kenya to provide relief to people affected by the drought and famine in Somalia.

In July 2014, Saado Ali Warsame, a member of the Somali Federal Parliament, was assassinated by Islamic extremists. Because rumors had spread that Dahabshiil was involved in the incident, Mohamed and 50 other members of the owner’s family took an oath at a meeting of their clan that they had no involvement in the incident.

In April 2019, Forbes reported that Mohamed was among the top five wealthiest Somalis, with an estimated net worth of $1 billion. At that time, he was the owner of the Dahabshir Group, which included Dahabshir Bank, Dahabshir Money Transfer, Somtel Communications, and the online payment system "TalkRemit." He also held shares in real estate and insurance companies in the United Kingdom, the United States, and the United Arab Emirates.

In July 2019, Mohamed donated $100,000 toward the renovation of the Berbera Vocational School, which was undergoing renovations at the time.
