= Information Centre about Asylum and Refugees =

The Information Centre about Asylum and Refugees (ICAR) was an organisation involved in academic research and information provision on asylum seekers and refugees in the United Kingdom. Founded in 2000, ICAR was initially based at King's College London. The organisation subsequently moved to City, University of London but, following withdrawal of support from City as a result of funding cuts, it moved into offices shared with the Runnymede Trust. In January 2015, the Black Cultural Archives contacted the Living Refugee Archives at the University of East London (UEL) about a deposit of materials from the Runnymede Trust. Selected materials from ICAR were subsequently identified for transfer to the UEL archives.

== See also ==
- MigrationWatch UK
