= Abdirashid Duale =

Somali entrepreneur (born 1977)

- Cabdirashiid Siciid Ducaale عبدالرشيد سعيد دعاله
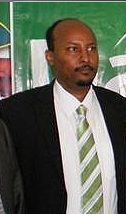
- Duale in September 2007
- Born: 1977 (age 48–49); Burao, Somali Democratic Republic (now Burao, Somaliland)
- Occupation: Businessman
- Known for: CEO of Dahabshiil
- Father: Mohamed Said Duale

Abdirashid Duale (Somali: Cabdirashiid Maxamed Siciid Ducale, Arabic: عبد الرشيد دعاله, born 1977) is a Somali entrepreneur. He is the CEO of Dahabshiil, an international funds transfer company.

== Biography ==
Duale was born in Burao, Somaliland in 1977. He belongs to the Habr Je'lo clan, part of the wider Isaaq clan-family.

His father, Mohamed Said Duale, founded Dahabshiil in 1970 in Burao, where he opened his first shop, and where Duale's career would begin.

Duale took over the company after his father retired, and began expanding Dahabshiil's reach into new markets. Today, the billionaire CEO's company Dahabshiil employs more than 2000 people worldwide, has offices in London and Dubai, and provides financial services to international organizations as well as to businesses and private individuals.

== See also ==
Abdi Awad Ali (Indhadeero) – renowned Kenyan entrepreneur and founder and former CEO of Indhadeero Group of Companies Qabiil: Xawadle
