= Dahabshiil =

Bank based in Dubai

- Industry: Money transfer
- Founded: 2004; Burao, Somaliland
- Founder: Mohamed Said Duale
- Headquarters: Dubai, UAE
- Key people: Abdirashid Duale (CEO)
- Number of employees: over 2,000
- Website: www.dahabshiil.com

Dahabshiil (Somali: Dahabshiil, Arabic: دهب شيل) is a Somali funds transfer company, headquartered in Dubai, UAE, and is the largest money-transfer business in Africa. Formed in 2004, the firm operates from over 24,000 outlets and employs more than 2,000 people across 126 countries. It provides financial services to international organisations, as well as to both large and small businesses and private individuals. The company is also involved in community building projects in Somalia.

== History ==
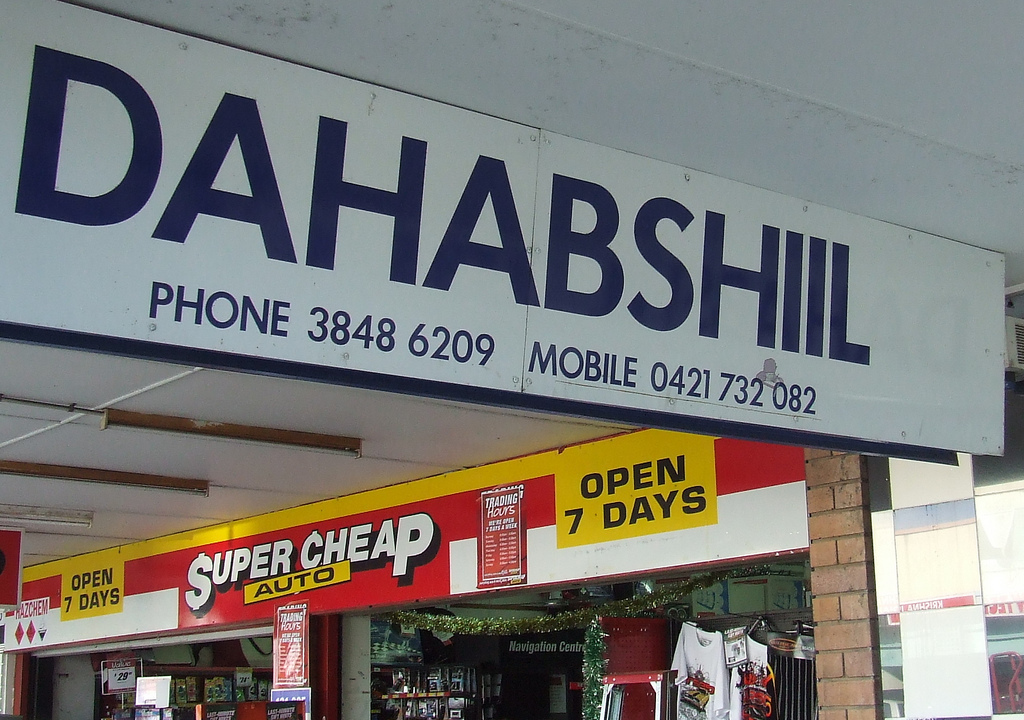
A Dahabshiil franchise outlet in Brisbane, Australia.

Dahabshiil (meaning "Gold smelter" in Somali) was founded in 1970 by Mohamed Said Duale, a Somali entrepreneur based in Burao, the capital city of Togdheer province in Somalia.

Initially a general trading enterprise, the firm began specialising in remittance broking during the 1970s, when many Somali males from Somalia migrated to the Gulf States for work. This resulted in a growing demand for services to transfer money from those migrant workers back to their families.

Because of foreign exchange controls imposed by the Somali government at the time, most of the funds were transferred via a trade-based system known as Franco Valuta (FV); the latter process involved the import of goods, proceeds from the sale of which were sent to migrants' families. These transactions formed the bulk of Dahabshiil's business throughout the 1980s.

With the Somali Civil War fast approaching, the Duale family were among the hundreds of thousands who retreated to the Somali-inhabited Somali Region under Ethiopian Occupation. The business in Somalia collapsed, but Duale was able to draw on an extensive network of contacts in the Gulf to re-establish the venture, setting up a small office in Ethiopia to serve displaced Somali communities there and in Djibouti.

In 1989, Dahabshiil opened its first office in London where a number of Somalis had arrived during the war. The branch in Whitechapel was managed by Mohammed Duale's son, Abdirashid Duale, who began to expand the business as the Somali population in the UK grew.

== Somali money transfer industry ==
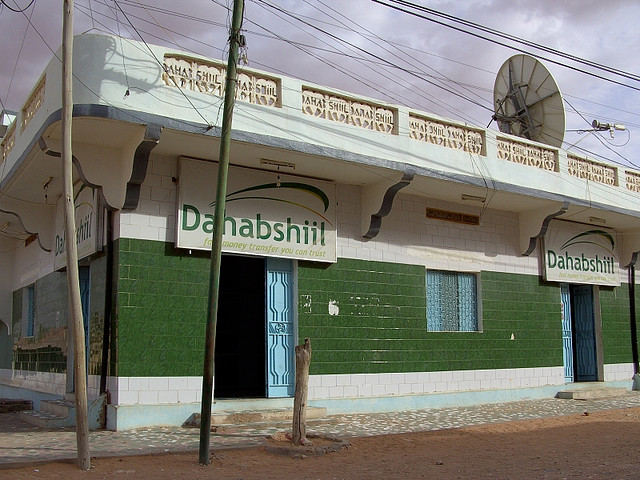
A Dahabshiil franchise outlet in Puntland, Somalia.

Funds transfer services have become a large industry in Somalia. Estimates of the aggregate value of remittances from the Somali diaspora back to the home country vary. However, a recent study by the United Nations Development Programme suggested a figure of around $1.6 billion, sent largely by emigrants in the US, Europe and the Gulf region. Industry experts estimate that Dahabshiil handles around two-thirds of all remittances to Somali-speaking regions.

Most of the Somali money transfer operators (MTOs) are credentialed members of either the Somali Money Transfer Association (SOMTA), an umbrella organisation that regulates the community's money transfer sector, or its predecessor, the Somali Financial Services Association (SFSA). Besides Dahabshiil, Somali MTOs include Qaran Express, Mustaqbal, Amal Express, Kaah Express, Hodan Global, Olympic, Amana Express, Iftin Express and Tawakal Express. A unique feature of these Somali funds transfer companies is that they all charge lower commission fees than their Western counterparts; typically around 5% for sums of up to $1,000, a range encompassing the vast majority of Somali household remittances. For amounts greater than $1,000, Somali MTOs charge commissions of 3% to 4%, significantly lower than Western Union's 7.1% fee and MoneyGram's 7.2% fee for sending similar amounts to Ethiopia. Charges for the remittance of charity funding vary between 0% and 2%.

Accounting for almost a quarter of household income in Somalia, funds remitted by the Somali diaspora have helped to sustain communities in some of the most remote locations in the Horn of Africa. With around 40% of households receiving such assistance from relatives working abroad, remittances have proved significant in promoting private sector activity in telecoms, transport and housing, as well as in basic infrastructure, health and education. It has also been argued that the inflow of such foreign-based capital has helped keep the Somali shilling afloat and offset depreciatory and inflationary pressures.

== Overview ==
=== Branches and transfer network ===
Dahabshiil is the largest of the Somali money transfer operators (MTOs), having captured most of the market vacated by Al-Barakaat. The firm has its headquarters in Dubai and employs more than 2,000 people across 144 countries, with 130 branches in Somalia, a further 130 branches in the United Kingdom, and 400 branches globally. Its worldwide network comprises more than 24,000 agent and branch locations, and the company offers both SMS notification and 24-hour online transfers.

=== Products and services ===
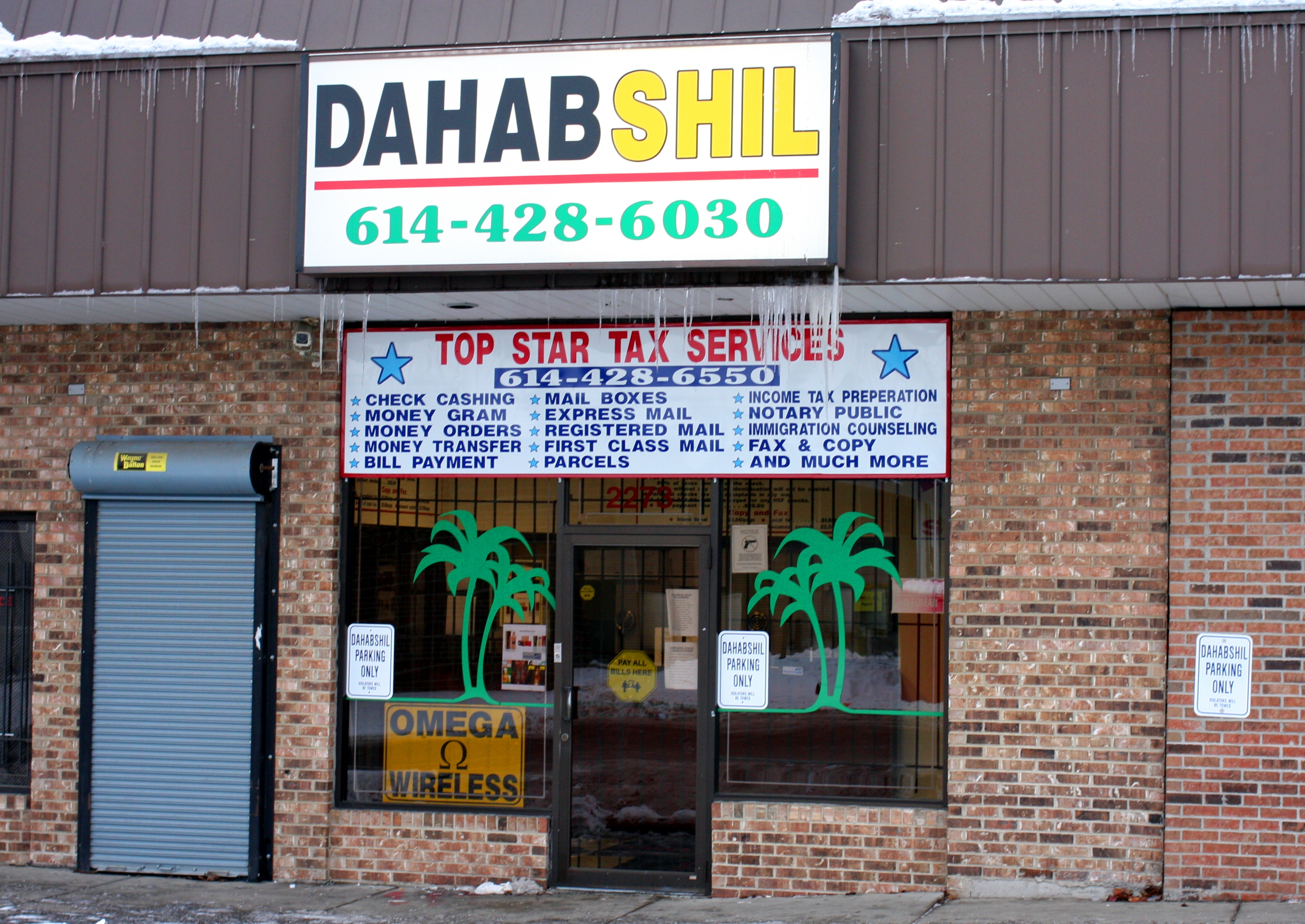
A Dahabshiil franchise outlet in Columbus, Ohio, USA.

Remittance transfer remains Dahabshiil's core business, but the company has diversified to offer financial services to international organisations, businesses and private individuals. Most of the major international development organisations operating in Somalia use Dahabshiil to transfer funds, including the UN, WHO, World Bank, Oxfam, Save the Children and Care International.

In 2008, Dahabshiil acquired a majority stake in Somtel, a Somalia-based telecommunications firm specializing in high speed broadband, mobile internet, and mobile phone services. The acquisition provided Dahabshiil with the necessary platform for a subsequent expansion into mobile banking, a growth industry in the regional banking sector.

In early 2009, Dahabshiil opened an Islamic bank, Dahabshil Bank International, in Djibouti. An international bank, DBI provides services to business and private clients demanding Shariah-compliant financing. Operations centre on asset finance, partnership finance and lease finance.

That same year, Dahabshiil teamed up with leading Somali retailers, hotels, restaurants, and petrol stations to launch 'Dahabshiil eCash', Somalia first debit card service.

=== Community investment ===
Dahabshiil invests 5% of its annual profits in community projects aimed at improving schools, hospitals, agriculture and sanitation services. It also sponsors a number of social events, including the Somali Week Festival and the Somali Youth Sports Association in the UK, which help to promote understanding and cooperation through Somali art and culture and sport, respectively. After the tsunami of 2004, the company helped provide immediate relief to the people in the regions of Somalia that were most affected. In 2009, the firm also donated $20,000 toward the establishment of a state-of-the-art mental health facility in Garowe, the administrative capital of the northeastern Puntland region of Somalia.

=== Compliance ===
Dahabshiil's services are managed according to international regulations to combat terrorism, money laundering and other illegal activities. The firm is a member of the International Association of Money Transfer Networks (IAMTN), the UK Money Transmitter Association and the USA Money Transmitter Association.

In 2010, Dahabshiil became the first international payments firm to achieve authorisation from the UK Financial Services Authority (FSA), under the Payment Services Regulations of that year which demand the highest standards of security, customer protection, transparency and speed of delivery.

In May 2013, Barclays announced its decision to end the banks business relationship with Dahabshiil, citing a lack of "strong anti-laundering governance structures." The decision was delayed after British lawmakers lobbied Barclays. In July 2013, Mo Farah, the Somali-born Olympic gold medalist, joined legislators and activists in a campaign urging Barclays Bank to repeal its decision to withdraw from the UK remittance market. On 5 November 2013, the High Court in London granted an interim injunction preserving the banking arrangement between Dahabshiil and Barclays until the conclusion of a full trial. Judge Launcelot Henderson described Barclays' decision to terminate Dahabshiil's account as "unfair", and requested a detailed examination into the reasons behind the bank's decision. Barclays have since ended their relationship with Dahabshiil as part of their de-risking.

=== Partnership ===
In September 2020, Dahabshiil has collaborated with Maico Money Transfer, a Rwandan startup in Fintech.

== Controversies ==
=== Guantanamo Bay detainee ===
In February 2009, Peter Finn writing in The Washington Post, cited allegations that Guantanamo captive Mohammed Sulaymon Barre, while working for Dahabshiil, may have laundered money for terrorists. He suggested this was an example of the difficulties that faced the joint task force US President Barack Obama had put in place to conduct new reviews of the detainees' status.

=== Unfair advantage through ties with the government ===
Ever since Ahmed Mohamed Mohamoud was elected for president in 2010, certain Somali journalists and political groups have been accusing him of providing Dahabshiil with unfair advantage and complete control over Somali remittances, which play a significant role on the local economy. These allegations are often based on the fact that Ahmed Mohamed Mohamoud has appointed Ali H. Hassan, who is Dahabshiil's founder cousin, as the chief of cabinet, and Sa'ad Haji Ali Shireh, the former CEO of the firm as a minister

=== Website shutdown ===
In 2011, a group of independent Somali journalists alleged that Dahabshiil had temporarily succeeded in convincing their web-host to shut down their site because they had published stories critical of the firm. They published a copy of a letter faxed to their webhosting service, demanding the removal of over a dozen of their articles about Dahabshiil. The reporters also suggested one of the stories Dahabshiil wanted removed concerned a song by popular Somali singer Saado Ali Warsame that was critical of Dahabshiil.

=== Bell Pottinger ===
In 2011, an undercover investigation by The Independent suggested that public relations firm Bell Pottinger had been contracted by Dahabshiil to minimise any negative reporting of the company, including the Guantanamo Bay detainee affair. The Bell Pottinger executives detailed their techniques, which purportedly included manipulating the ranking of Google search results to suppress unwanted coverage, and also boasted that they had a 'team' that could manage Wikipedia articles. The contract was said to have been a success.

=== Barclays bank account closure ===
In 2013, Barclays Bank announced that it would no longer provide banking services to Dahabshiil, citing concerns over compliance with anti-money laundering regulations. The move followed a similar decision by the British bank, HSBC, to sever ties with the company in 2012. This resulted in Dahabshiil's accounts being closed by both banks, leading to financial difficulties for the company and its customers.

Dahabshiil has since been fighting to regain access to banking services.

=== Hussein et al v. Dahabshiil ===
On 9 December 2015, the son of killed Somali artist Saado Ali Warsame filed a lawsuit against Dahabshiil in US federal court. The plaintiff Harbi Hussein claims that the company bankrolled the assassination of his mother and other Al-Shabaab terror. The 24-page complaint filed in United States District Court for the Southern District of New York traces Ali's musical career, her opposition to the former military junta and outspoken criticism of the company which entailed publishing a song where it referred to Dahabshiil as "Blood Smelter" as opposed to its original meaning, "Gold Smelter".
