= Diriye Osman =

British painter (born 1983)

Diriye Osman ديري عثمان
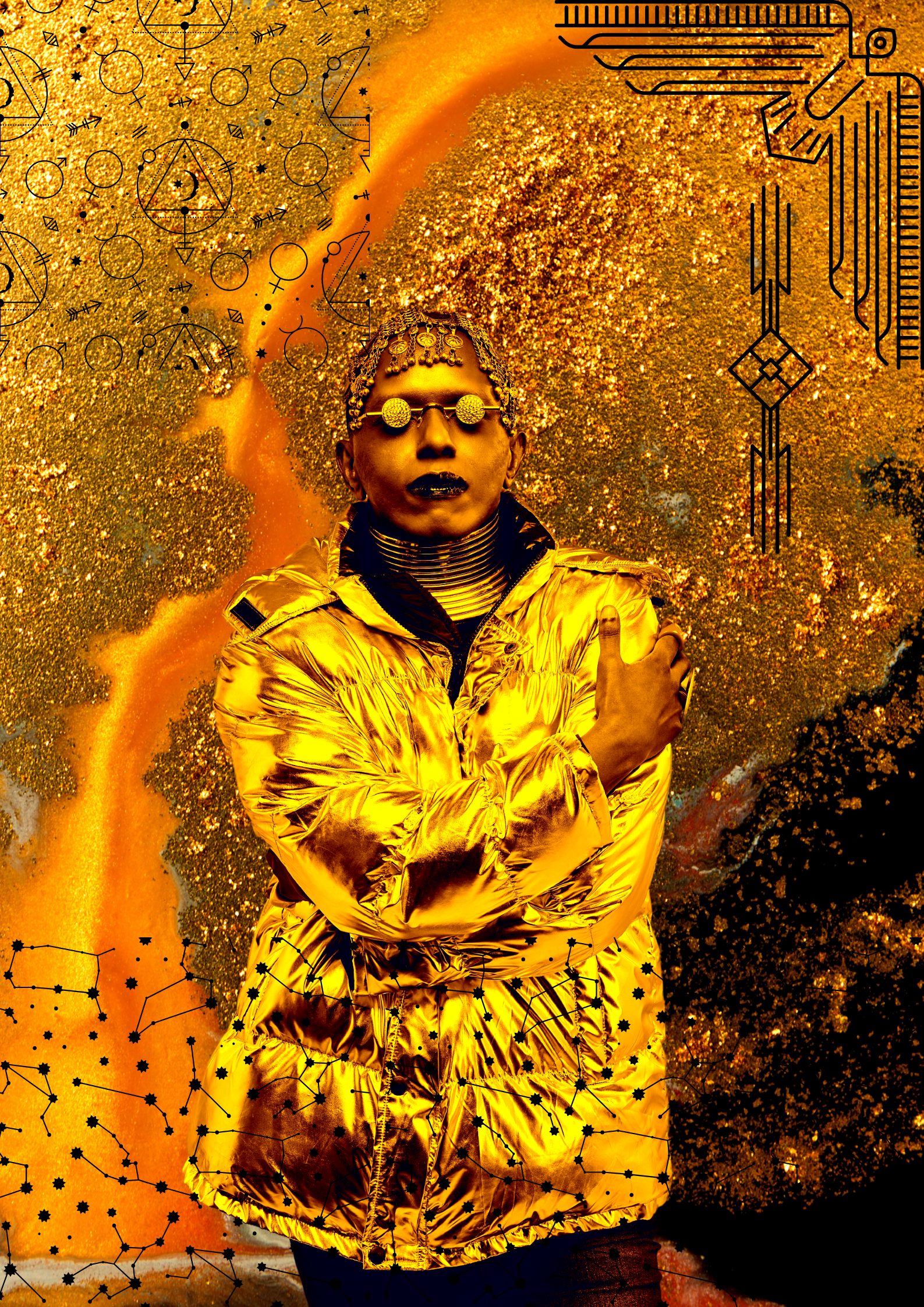
- Diriye Osman, by Diriye Osman and Robbie Ewing, August 2022
- Born: 1983 (age 42–43); Mogadishu, Somalia
- Education: University of Birmingham, Royal Holloway, University of London
- Occupations: Writer, visual artist, essayist, critic
- Writing career
- Period: 2003-present
- Website: diriyeosman.com

Diriye Osman (Somali: Diriyeh Cismaan, Arabic: ديري عثمان) (born in 1983) is a British-Somali author, visual artist, critic and essayist. His books include the award-winning collection of stories, Fairytales For Lost Children, and the collection of interlinked stories, The Butterfly Jungle, which Osman wrote and designed on his phone. Dubbed "a master of the surreal" and one of the most influential LGBT people in the UK, his writing and art have appeared in The Guardian, Granta, The Financial Times, The Huffington Post, Vice Magazine, Poetry Review, Prospect Magazine, Time Out London, Attitude Magazine, Afropunk, and many other publications.

== Biography ==
Osman was born in 1983 in Mogadishu, Somalia. When the civil war broke out in the early 1990s, he and his family relocated to Nairobi, Kenya.

As a child, Osman developed an interest in fashion design. His parents encouraged his desire to become a designer. An avid reader, he was also enthralled with the works of C. S. Lewis and Roald Dahl, as well as The Adventures of Tintin and Calvin and Hobbes. In 2001, Osman and his family moved again to London, England.

In 2002, at the age of 18, Osman was diagnosed with psychosis and institutionalised in a mental hospital in Woolwich, South London. He was so traumatized by the experience that he did not speak for nearly six months. After he was released from the hospital, his mother encouraged him to apply for a library card and he began to read Nuruddin Farah, Arundhati Roy, Zadie Smith, Manil Suri, Alice Munro, Alison Bechdel, ZZ Packer, Edwidge Danticat and Junot Díaz. By reading as widely as possible, Osman regained the confidence to speak. Reading extensively also made him want to learn about characters and stories that echoed his own experiences.

For his post-secondary education, Osman studied English Literature, Linguistics and Fine Art at the University of Birmingham, graduating with a BA (hons) degree. He later attended Royal Holloway, University of London, where he earned an MA in Creative Writing.

== Writing ==
In 2008, after recovering from another period of poor health, Osman began to write short stories. He has commented that although he writes for a general audience, his main interest is in positively representing the universal Somali experience. Much of his literary work has also been based on his own life as a gay man, as well as other personal experiences.

Osman published "Earthling", a short story about a young lesbian recently released from a psychiatric unit. Ellah Allfrey in The Daily Telegraph called it "a moving exploration of family, sexuality and mental breakdown set in south-east London". Shortly afterwards, Osman wrote "Pavilion", a story about a "six-foot" Somali transvestite working in a "mental clink". These and other stories were published as part of his 2013 debut collection Fairytales for Lost Children. Osman personally designed the illustrations for the book over several weeks. With the assistance of his cousin Osob Dahir, a poet, he translated the title of each story using Arabic calligraphy.

Fairytales for Lost Children was well received by literary critics, with Magnus Taylor of New Internationalist calling Osman "a startlingly original voice". Similarly, the Lambda Literary Review described the work as "texturally beautiful and tonally gorgeous"; Binyavanga Wainaina hailed the book as "taut, feral, sinewy, fearless", and proclaimed Osman "a new Baldwin". Jameson Fitzpatrick of Next Magazine noted that the "stories are suffused with the possibility of joy and pleasure"; Alison Bechdel added that through storytelling Osman creates a shelter for his displaced characters, "a warm place which is both real and imaginary, in which they find political, sexual, and ultimately psychic liberation;" Bernardine Evaristo, writing in The Independent, hailed Osman as a courageous and original writer, remarking that his language is "crafted with all the concision and riches of poetry." Roxane Gay in The Nation also summarized the piece as a "raw collection of short stories"; Eden Wood of Diva Magazine praising Osman's "vivid and intimate" style; Will Davis, writing in Attitude Magazine, likewise noted that Fairytales for Lost Children was "a rich, complex and lyrical set of tales," adding that "this collection of stories is sure to move and enthral in equal measure." Dominique Sisley of Dazed & Confused commended the collection for exploring subjects "often ignored by mainstream media – namely being LGBT in Africa, and being torn between your sexual impulses and your cultural heritage". Additionally, Somali writer Nuruddin Farah described Osman's prose as "fantastic", indicating that he "read some of the stories more than once and saw in each one of them plenty of talent everywhere".

In March 2022, Osman released The Butterfly Jungle, "a genre-bending encounter with the mind of a queer British-Somali journalist and its mirroring of contemporary life." Osman was praised by Brittle Paper as being "a master of the surreal", and by novelist, Sofia Samatar, as "an artist of glittering style" whose "writing is similarly streetwise and mystical, inspired by jazz, hip-hop, the rhythms of prayer, and the syncopated sounds of multilingual urban slang." Described as a book with Afrofuturist influences, Osman wrote the novel on his phone.

The Butterfly Jungle was acclaimed as one of the notable African books of 2022 by Brittle Paper and Open Country Magazine

Osman's writing has appeared in a number of publications, including the Poetry Review, Financial Times, Time Out London, Prospect, Kwani?, Under The Influence, The Guardian, The Huffington Post, Vice, Jungle Jim, Attitude and SCARF Magazine, the latter of which was founded by Osman's editor Kinsi Abdulleh.

== Visual art ==
As a child, Osman was encouraged to draw. He began creating visual art at the age of eight, spending hours alone conjuring up fairy-like fantasies infused with his experience as an immigrant. Walt Disney, Fritz Lang, Gustav Klimt, H. R. Giger and the Japanese filmmaker Hayao Miyazaki were among his main influences. An overall Vogue magazine sensibility is also evident in the sensuous physiques and catwalk poses of his figures. According to Osman, his art was a creative outlet through which he could channel his frustrations at growing up in a society that did not tolerate homosexuality. His painted images of "goddess-like" women were thus for him "the acceptable, alluring face of what was a dangerous transgression". He also describes his visual creations as "a way of distilling mania and transforming it into something beautiful."

Writing in Another Africa, Elmi Ali notes that Osman's images, "which usually feature female heroines, adorned in intricate lines, decadent and colourful", are "reminiscent of the Art Nouveau masters of the past[...] The Austrian artist Gustav Klimt is hinted at but his work finds an uncanny kinship in Margaret Macdonald Mackintosh, a brilliant Scottish artist also of the Art Nouveau period." However, Ali remarks that Osman's work, like that of William S. Burroughs, "goes a step further, and incorporates Arabic calligraphy and Hebrew". To this end, Osman's piece The Goddess Complex – Aquatic Arabesque, which he painted during a three-week commission for an Omani-English couple with whom he was friends, features a poem entitled "Your Love" by the Syrian poet Nizar Qabbani. Osman's At The Altar of Imagination, a non-commissioned drawing, likewise contains Hebrew script in addition to Arabic verses by the Sufi poet Ibn ‘Arabi.

Osman usually paints using 3D textile paint, glow-in-the-dark glue, powder dye and temporary tattoo stickers, among other craft-based materials. He also utilizes Swarovski crystals for a more lavish effect.

== Awards ==
In 2014, Osman's short story collection Fairytales for Lost Children won the Polari First Book Prize. He is the first writer from Africa to receive the award. The Guardian also named the work one of the best books of the year. In 2015, Dazed & Confused named him one of the top ten LGBT writers to watch. In the same year his short story "If I Were A Dance" was listed by The Guardian as one of the best representations of LGBT sex in literature. Osman was named one of the most influential LGBTI people in Britain by The Independent on Sunday.

== Selected works ==
=== Writing ===
Fiction

- Fairytales for Lost Children (2013)
- This Is How We Soften Our Hearts (short, 2014)
- We Once Belonged to the Sea (2018)
- The Butterfly Jungle (2022)

Non-fiction

- How Art Can Save a Life (2014)
- To Be Young, Gay and African (2014) in Gordon, J.R. & Beadle-Blair, R. eds., 2014. Black and Gay in the UK - An Anthology
- A Feminine Man is a Powerful Thing To Be (2014)

=== Visual art ===
- THE GODDESS COMPLEX – Aquatic Arabesque
- At The Altar of Imagination
- Keepsakes of Light
- The Enchanted Forest Inside My Head
