= London Somalia Conference =

Diplomatic conference

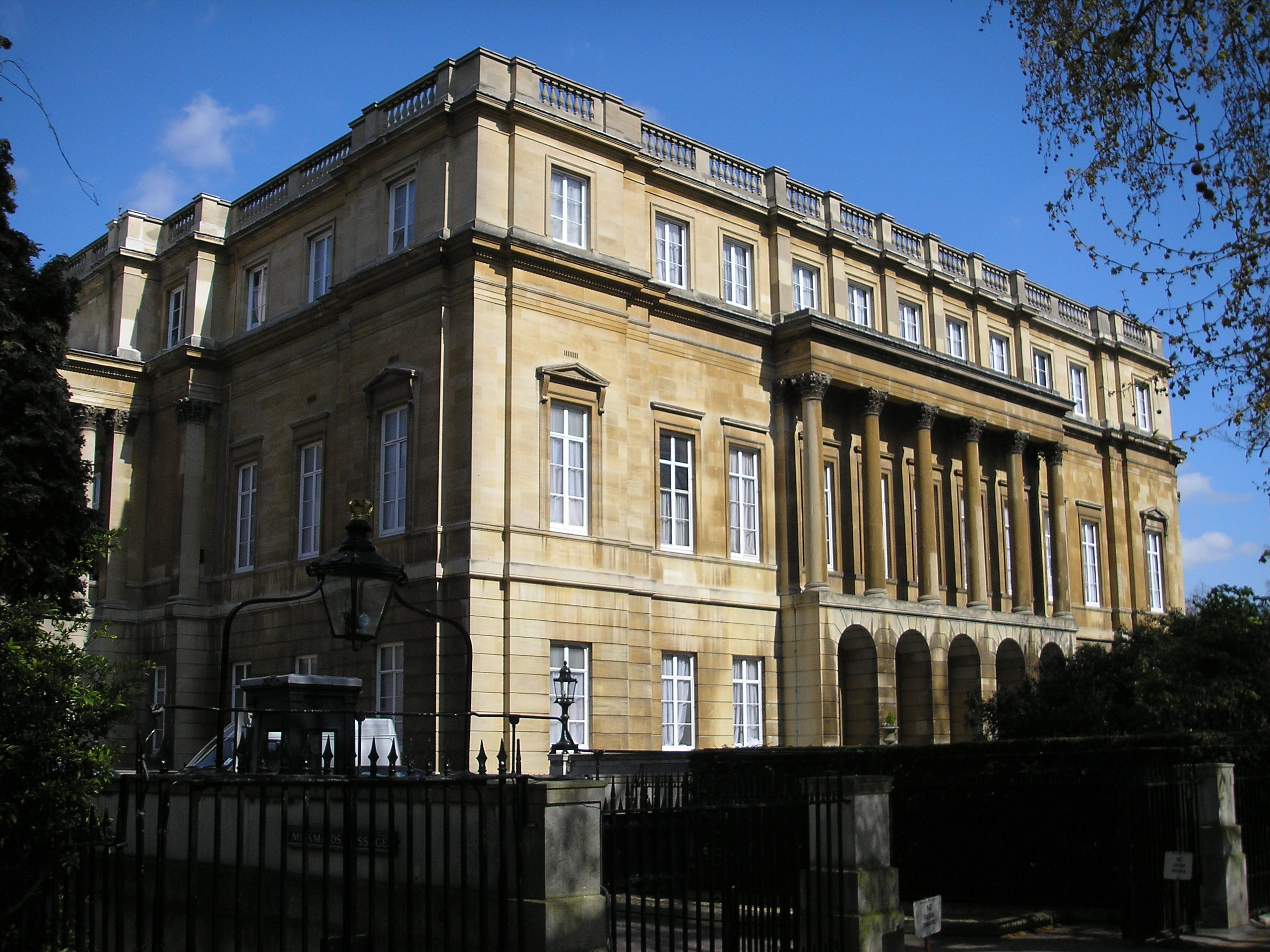
Lancaster House, the site of the conference.

The London Somalia Conference was a diplomatic conference hosted by the Government of the United Kingdom, which took place in London on 23 February 2012. Attended by Somali government officials and members of the international community, it focused on resolving issues that have arisen in Somalia in the wake of the civil war.

== Overview ==
The London Somalia Conference was the latest of 20 international conferences on Somalia that have been conducted since the outbreak of the civil war in the country. According to the British Foreign and Commonwealth Office (FCO), the meeting aimed to come up with a new approach by addressing both the root causes and effects of local problems.

The conference was attended by representatives of Somalia's Transitional Federal Government (TFG), as well as the Presidents of the autonomous Puntland, Somaliland and Galmudug regions and Ahlu Sunnah wal Jamaah (ASWJ). In addition, officials from about 50 governments and from various international organizations took part, including the United Nations, African Union, European Union, World Bank, the Intergovernmental Authority on Development, the Organisation of Islamic Cooperation and the League of Arab States. The Al-Shabaab militant group, which controls parts of south-central Somalia, was not invited to participate in the meeting. The meeting was held at Lancaster House.

In the build-up to the conference, Somali and global stakeholders convened with the British authorities to discuss the meeting's key areas of concern. The British Foreign and Commonwealth Office indicated that sustained political commitment and tangible action would be necessary and that the involved parties would need to support and build upon the existing work of the Somali civil society groups, the UN, AU and NGOs. It also stated that although progress would likely be gradual, it hoped the conference would serve as a catalyst and perhaps eventually come to be regarded as a turning point. British Prime Minister David Cameron said that the international community's focus should be on assisting the Somali authorities' extant efforts at strengthening security and establishing a representative government, and on assuring delivery of humanitarian assistance to vulnerable areas.

== Objectives ==
According to the planners of the conference, there were seven specific areas of interest for which they hoped to agree on a series of practical measures:

- Security: sustainable funding for the African Union Mission in Somalia (AMISOM), and support for Somali security and justice sectors
- Political Process: agreement to what should succeed the transitional institutions in Mogadishu in August 2012 and the establishment of a Joint Financial Management Board
- Local Stability: a coordinated international package of support to Somalia's regions
- Counter-terrorism: renewed commitment to tackle collectively the terrorist threat emanating from Somalia
- Piracy: breaking the piracy business model
- Humanitarian: renewed commitment to tackling Somalia's humanitarian crisis
- International coordination: agreement on improved international handling of Somalia issues

== Reception ==
According to Reuters correspondents, the situation in Somalia may not be easy to change as many actors derive benefits from the lack of a strong central authority, including some politicians, power brokers, militants, pirate kingpins, smugglers, traders, financiers and aid contractors. Attempts at reform have consequently often been sabotaged. However, British Foreign Minister William Hague indicated that the time was ripe for international collaboration on Somalia since there were "glimmers of hope" in the lead-up to the meeting, among which Hague cited the ousting of militants from the capital Mogadishu, a successful anti-terrorism policy, progress on the piracy issue, and the chance to establish a more broad-based, representative federal government after the interim administration's mandate ends in August.

In addition, Somali Prime Minister Abdiweli Mohamed Ali stated that while he believed his nation was "moving into an era of peace, stability and normalcy", the comprehensive, Marshall Plan-like reconstruction scheme that he had hoped for was unlikely.

Campaigners also charged that the conference was not meant to address piracy or terrorism-related issues, but was instead a bid by the British government to protect its own economic interests in the strategically important and oil-rich Horn of Africa. As a consequence, they were reportedly organizing demonstrations in protest of the meeting.

The Al-Shabaab group of Islamists issued a press release condemning the meeting as the talks kicked off. Describing the gathering as "not in any way different from the various other conferences aimed at bolstering the invading African forces that are prolonging the instability in Somalia", the group characterized the meeting's signatories as agenda-driven. It also reaffirmed its "position that we will not under any circumstances allow any form of foreign intervention to be used as an instrument to subjugate the Muslims of Somalia and that we will confront and counter, by any means possible, all the outcomes of the London Conference".

During the talks, members of the Somali Twitter community were reportedly outraged by what they felt was a disproportionate emphasis on piracy and terrorism and a simultaneous under-representation of Somali voices. Many users also expressed misgivings over the meeting's purpose, believing that the conference was organized to secure foreign interests. Among the various speakers present during the morning session, only the Turkish Foreign Minister Ahmet Davutoglu's statements, including his insistence that the international community "cannot hold conferences away from Somalia... we have to be there", appeared to strike a chord.

== Resolutions ==
The London Conference For Somalia ended with several resolutions. Describing the opportunity for change as "real", US Secretary of State Hillary Clinton stated that the international community's emphasis in Somalia had now shifted from preventive to reconstructive tasks. Clinton also indicated that her administration would lobby for the imposition of sanctions on all parties impeding progress made by the Somali Transitional Federal Government. She cited among the latter preemptive measures travel bans and asset freezes, and pledged an additional $64 million in aid to the region.

According to British Foreign Minister William Hague, conference participants affirmed their support for the Transitional Federal Government of Somalia's scheduled August 2012 shift from an interim administration to a permanent representative government and underscored the need for an inclusive political process. They also agreed to create a new counter-piracy center and to prosecute kingpins, ransom negotiators and intermediaries. In addition, attendees upheld existing plans to establish a joint financial management board to ensure a transparent dispensation of Somali and donor funds. They also pledged support for Somalia's stable regions, agreeing to form a new fund earmarked for local dispute resolution, job creation, basic service delivery and development of government sectors.

UN Secretary-General Ban Ki-moon pressed the conference's participants to build on recent successes, after the capture of the strategic southern town of Baidoa from the Al-Shabaab group of militants and a UN vote to expand the AMISOM peacekeeping force to 17,000 soldiers.

A follow-up meeting was scheduled to be held in June 2012 in Istanbul.
