= Hanan Ibrahim =

Hanan A. Ibrahim حنان ابراهيم
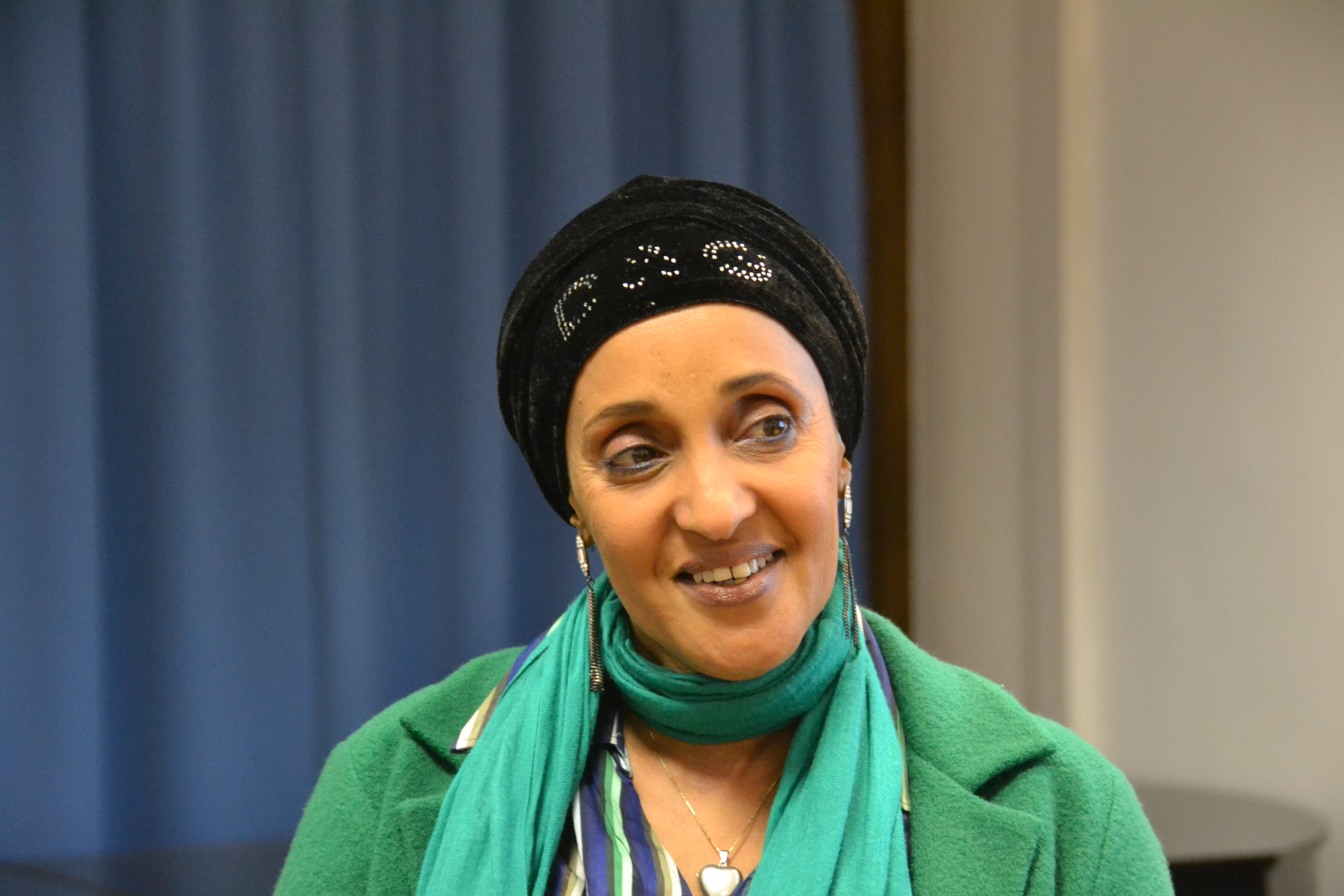
- Born: Somalia
- Citizenship: Somalia
- Occupation: Activist
- Title: Chairperson of the Barnet Muslim Women's Network
- Children: 3
- Awards: Queen's Award for Voluntary Service 2004; Ambassador For Peace Award in 2009; London Borough of Barnet Civic Award 2010.

Hanan Ibrahim MBE (Somali: Xanaan Ibraahiim, Arabic: حنان ابراهيم) is a Somali social activist. She is the Chairperson of the Barnet Muslim Women's Network, among other organizations.

== Early years ==
Ibrahim grew up in Somalia. She is a mother of three children and a Muslim. After the outbreak of the civil war in her native country, she moved to the United Kingdom in 1998.

== Career ==
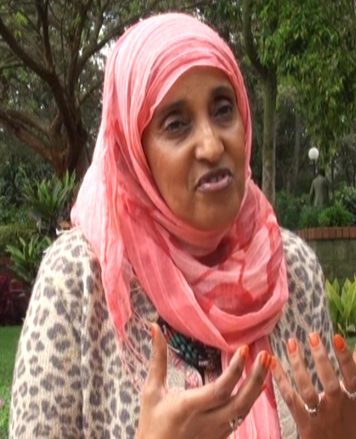
Hanan Ibrahim addressing the ISSAT (2013).

In a professional capacity, Ibrahim worked with the Women Interfaith Network, Sisters against Violent Extremism, the African SANG and the Women's Federation for World Peace.

While in London, she founded the Somali Family Support Group (SFSG), a non-governmental organization catering to the UK's Somali and larger Horn African community. The SFSG promotes inter-faith dialogue and understanding, and advocates for greater female participation in various issues. It also offers a variety of social services, including a family advice center, health awareness drives, job-search assistance and skill acquisition workshops.

She serves as the Chairperson for the Barnet Muslim Women's Network. In 2008, she became a member of the SAVE UK Advisory Board, a Women Without Borders initiative. Ibrahim is also part of various other organizations and panels. The latter include the governmental National Muslim Women Advisory Group and the National Community Forum, a consultative body for the Department of Communities.

Based on her knowledge and experience in law, Ibrahim was also in 2011 appointed by the Transitional Federal Government (TFG) of Somalia to the Committee of Experts (CoE) tasked with preparing the country's new draft constitution.

== Awards ==
For her contributions to society, Ibrahim was presented in 2004 with the Queen's Award for Voluntary Service. She received the Ambassador For Peace Award in 2009.

In 2010, she won the London Borough of Barnet Civic Award and the Community Engagement Award from HAYA - Somali Organization in London. That year, she was made a Member of the Order of the British Empire (MBE) for her community work with the SFSG.
