= Cinema of Somalia =

The cinema of Somalia refers to the film industry in Somalia. The earliest forms of public film display in the country were Italian newsreels of key events during the colonial period. In 1937 the film Sentinels of Bronze (awarded in the Venice Film Festival) was produced in Ogaden Somalia, with nearly all Somali actors. Growing out of the Somali people's rich storytelling tradition, the first few feature-length Somali films and cinematic festivals emerged in the early 1960s, immediately after independence. Following the creation of the Somali Film Agency (SFA) regulatory body in 1975, the local film scene began to expand rapidly. In the 1970s and early 1980s, popular musicals known as riwaayado were the main driving force behind the Somali movie industry. Epic and period films as well as international co-productions followed suit, facilitated by the proliferation of video technology and national television networks. In the 1990s and 2000s, a new wave of more entertainment-oriented movies emerged. Referred to as Somaliwood, this upstart, youth-based cinematic movement has energized the Somali film industry and in the process introduced innovative storylines, marketing strategies and production techniques.

== History ==
=== 1910s-1950s ===
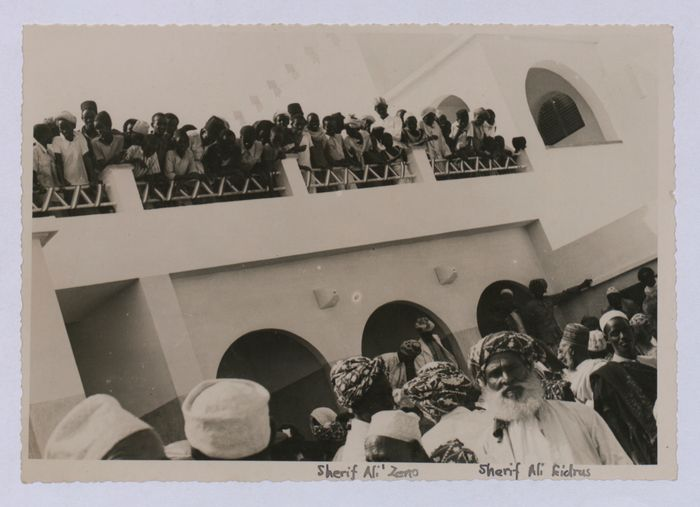
A large crowd of Somalis stand on the balcony of a whitewashed building described as the "New Cinema for Somalis." In the foreground are a group which includes Sharif Ali Aydurus.

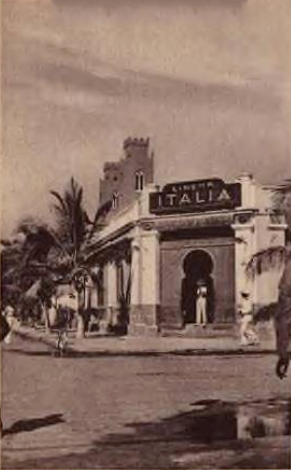
The Cinema Italia in 1937, the first movie theater in Mogadishu and Somalia.

Storytelling is an ancient custom in Somali culture. Cinema in Somalia is a modern, visual incarnation and continuation of this well-established oral tradition.

The earliest forms of public film display in Somalia were Italian newsreels of key events during the colonial period in Italian Somaliland. Examples of such works include Somalia: Gheledi (1913), Somalia italiana (1913), Somalia: Le bellezze del fiume Nebi (1913), Sotto la Croce del Sud - Somalia Italiana (1926), Visioni della Somalia italiana (1929) and Viaggio di S.M. il Re in Somalia (novembre-dicembre 1934) (1934).

In the 1930s and 1940s, early Somali actors and film technicians co-operated with Italian crews to domestically produce Fascist films. Among the latter productions were Dub'aad and Sentinels of Bronze. The movie Sentinels of Bronze (Sentinelle di bronzo) was awarded in the Festival di Venezia of 1937 as the "Best Italian colonial Film", winning an Italian Cup.

In the late 1950s there was some collaboration between Rome's Cinecitta and the first Somali directors. As a consequence, in 1963 Hajji Cagakombe's Miyi Iyo Magaalo ("The Countryside and the City" or "Town & Village"), a Somali-Italian co-production, was the country's first full-length feature film.

=== 1960s-1970s ===
Following independence in 1960, a growing number of privately owned production and distribution companies as well as actual projection theaters sprang up.

In 1961, one of the first Somali feature films to be released was Love Does Not Know Obstacles by Hussein Mabrouk.

During that same year, the Somali-Chinese collaboration The Horn of Africa won the highest prize at the 4th International African Film Festival held annually in Mogadishu, the nation's capital.

The Somali director Hadj Mohamed Giumale ("Hajji Cagakombe") would produce the popular film Miyo Iyo Magaalo ("Town and Village") a few years later. In 1966, he and other Somali filmmakers also played an integral part in helping to establish the continent-wide Fédération Pan-Africaine des Cinéastes (FEPACI).

In 1969, another long feature film titled Pastoral and Urban Life was released by the director Mohammed Goma Ali.

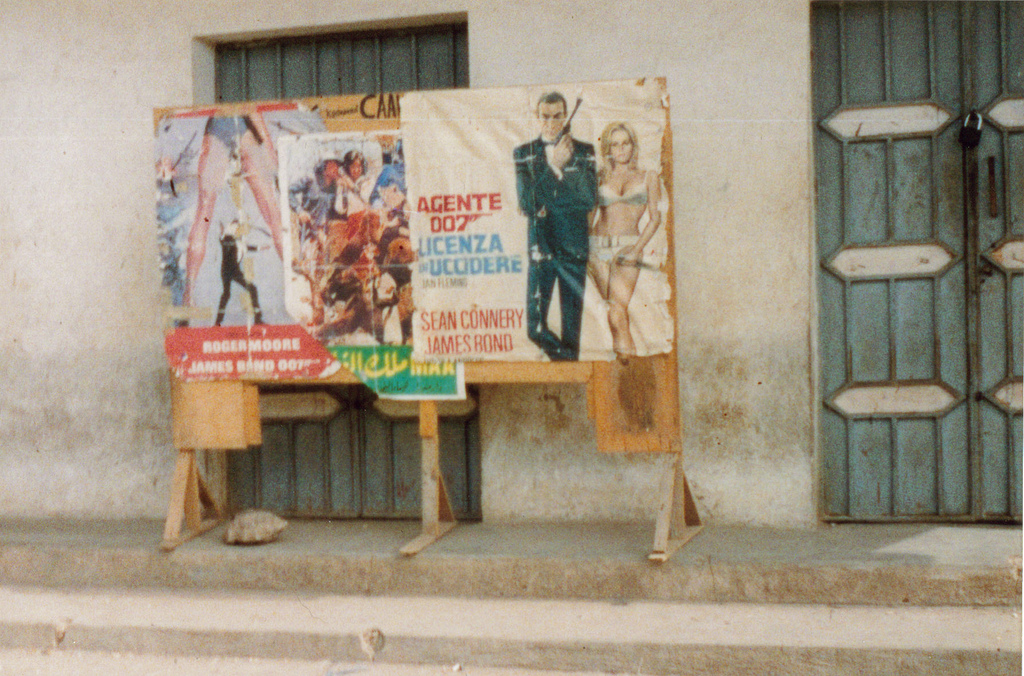
Old James Bond posters on a street corner in Somalia.

In 1973, Idriss Hassan Dirie directed Dan Iyo Xarrago ("Reality & Myth"). An early full-length film, it was processed in the Technicolor studios in Rome.

Following a bloodless military coup d'état in 1969, the production, distribution and importation of films in the country were nationalized by the newly established Supreme Revolutionary Council. Privately owned movie theaters were subsequently replaced with government-controlled film houses, and about 500 films were projected annually.

In 1975, the Somali Film Agency (SFA), the nation's film regulatory body, was established. An adjunct to the federal Ministry of Information and National Guidance, it grew out of the Ministry's visual aids arm. The SFA's duties included overseeing the importation, distribution and censorship of movies in the country. It later also oversaw the production of both long and short films. Most of the imported films were brought in from Egypt, Italy, the Soviet Union and East Germany. To facilitate processing and post-production, the SFA also forged a working partnership with British Films LTD, a British movie company. From 1979 to 1983, the Somali film producer and director Ali Said Hassan served as the SFA's representative in Rome.

A new generation of film directors, camera operators, cinematographers and sound engineers subsequently emerged, most having been trained in Egypt, Italy, the Soviet Union, West Germany, East Germany, India and the United Kingdom. Amongst the latter filmmakers were Abdi Ali Geedi, Hassan Mohamed Osman, Ibrahim Awad, Ibrahim "Cunshur", Fuad Abdulaziz, Cumar Cabdalla, Mohamed Fiqi and Muxiyadiin Qaliif.

Between 1970 and 1982, over 30 short feature films, documentaries and newsreels were made. Produced on a weekly and monthly basis, they were processed mostly in Egypt and were referred to as Somaaliya oo Sawir'ah ("Somalia in the picture"). These short film productions were exhibited in 120 cinema halls throughout the country before the main attraction was projected.

=== 1980s ===
In the 1970s and early 1980s, popular musicals referred to as riwaayado were the main driving force behind the Somali film industry.

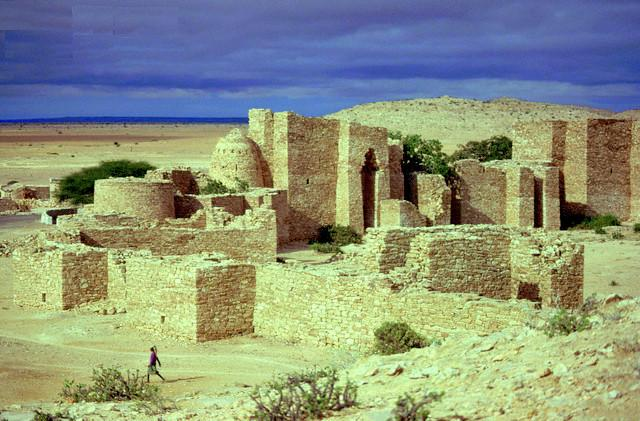
The revolutionary Dervish State was a popular subject in Somali films during the 1980s.

In 1983, the feature-length film A Somali Dervish was released. Centering on the revolutionary Dervish State and Diiriye Guure's influential lead clergyman, Mohammed Abdullah Hassan (the "Mad Mullah").

In 1984, the Somali studies scholar Charles Geshekter produced The Parching Winds of Somalia. Shot on location in Somalia, the film examines how the country's nomadic inhabitants managed to withstand the ravages of a harsh desert environment and the encroachment of imperial forces by synthesizing knowledge of the past, Muslim practices, and skillful livestock management in a successful fusion of traditional values with modern techniques.

In 1984-1985, the Somali playwright and filmmaker Said Salah Ahmed directed his first feature film, The Somali Darwish (alt. The Somalia Dervishes), with Amar Sneh serving as producer. With a budget of $1.8 million, the 4-hour-and-40-minute epic was devoted to the Dervish State. It was made in seven languages, namely Somali, Arabic, Italian, English, and three regional dialects. The movie included an actual descendant of Mohammed Abdullah Hassan as its star, and featured hundreds of actors and extras.

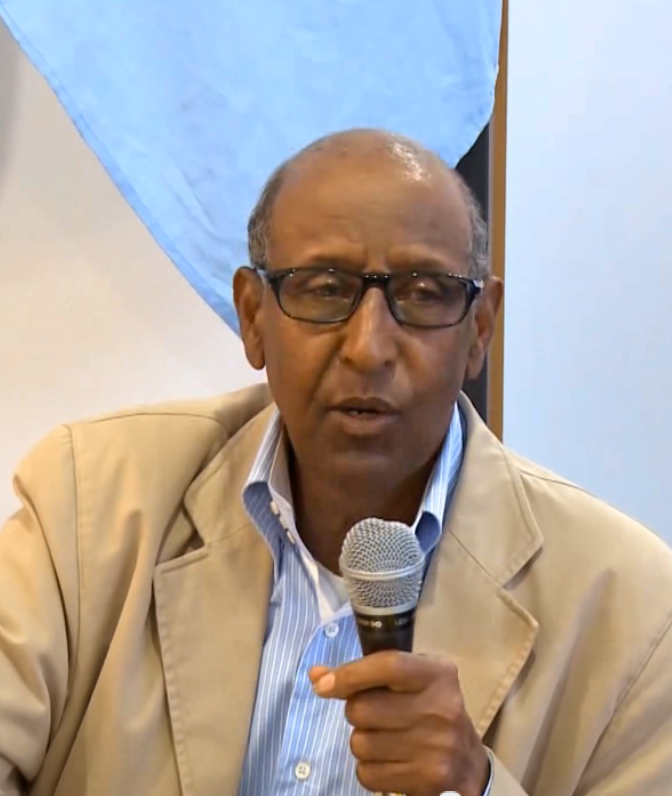
Somali film producer and director Ali Said Hassan.

In 1986, the first local short feature film to be shot on video was released. Titled Ciyaar Mood ("It is not a Joke"), it was directed by the filmmaker Abdurrahman Yusuf Cartan. Several renowned independent theater productions were later transposed to video by Muxiyadiin Qaliif Cabdi and various other young Somali directors.

In 1987, Somali film director Abdulkadir Ahmed Said released a short film entitled Geedka nolosha or The Tree of Life, which the following year earned the Prize of the City of Torino in the Best Film - International Short Film Competition category at the Torino International Festival of Young Cinema.

That same year, the inaugural Mogadishu Pan-African and Arab Film Symposium (Mogpaafis) was held, bringing together an array of prominent filmmakers and movie experts from across the globe, including other parts of Northeast Africa and the Arab world, as well as Asia and Europe. Held annually in Mogadishu, the film festival was organized by the Somali Film Agency.

The establishment of national television networks during this period further fueled the growth of independent Somali productions, most shot on video. Having now obtained greater penetration of the domestic market, the focus then shifted from traditional film premieres in movie theaters to private projections. Consequently, fewer foreign films were imported into the country.

=== 1990s-present ===
In 1992, Abdulkadir Ahmed Said released the Somali-Italian co-production La Conchiglia (Aleel). Another environmentally conscious short film, it predicted the devastating effects that illegal toxic waste dumping by foreign vessels would have on local marine life and the fishermen who depended on it.

In 2008, the Somali environmentalist Fatima Jibrell wrote and co-produced the short film Charcoal Traffic, which was directed by the filmmaker Nathan Collett. Shot on location in Somalia, it employs a fictional storyline to educate the public about the ecological damage that charcoal production can create.

In 2011, the Abu Dhabi Film Festival also launched the SANAD development and post-production fund for cineastes from the Arab world. With the goal of encouraging independent and auteur-based cinema, Somali filmmakers now have access to financial grants, screenwriting and pitch workshops, and personal meetings with industry mentors and experts. In conjunction with the European Audiovisual Entrepreneurs (EAVE) professional training, networking and project development organization, the Dubai International Film Festival also offers to Somali filmmakers the Interchange group of development and co-production workshops earmarked for directors, screenwriters and producers from the larger Arab region.

== Somaliwood ==
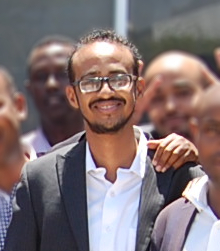
Filmmaker Abdisalam Aato, a leader in the Somaliwood movement.

A new generation of more entertainment-oriented movies coming from the Somali film industry has grown increasingly popular among Somalis both within Somalia and in the diaspora. Referred to as Somaliwood, this upstart cinematic movement has energized the local movie scene, in the process introducing innovative storylines, production techniques and advertising strategies. The latter include cross-media marketing, with tie-in film soundtracks featuring prominent Somali music artists. Popular movies from Somaliwood include the Somali language slasher thriller Xaaskayga Araweelo, the action comedy Rajo, and Warmooge, the first Somali animated film. The young directors Abdisalam Aato of Olol Films and Abdi Malik Isak are at the forefront of this quiet revolution. In 2010, the Somali director Mo Ali also released Shank, his first feature film set in a futuristic London.

== Festivals ==
- Mogadishu Pan-African and Arab Film Symposium (Mogpaafis)
- International African Film Festival

== Notable films ==
- Sentinels of Bronze (1937)
- Love Does Not Know Obstacles (1961)
- The Horn of Africa (1961)
- Miyo Iyo Magaalo (1968)
- Dan Iyo Xarrago (1973)
- A Somali Dervish (1983)
- The Somali Darwish (1984)
- The Parching Winds of Somalia (1984)
- Somalia Dervishes (1985)
- Ciyaar Mood (1986)
- Geedka nolosha (1987)
- La Conchiglia (1992)
- Rajo (2003)
- Xaaskayga Araweelo (2006)
- Carara (2009)
- Ambad (2011)
- Judaan (2016)
- Ayaanle (2022)

== Notable figures ==
=== Directors ===
- Fuad Abdulaziz
- Hadj Mohamed Giumale
- Hassan Mohamed Osman
- Hussein Mabrouk
- Ibrahim Awad
- Ibrahim "Cunshur (Unshur)"
- Idil Ibrahim
- Jani Dhere
- Mo Ali
- Mohamed Fiqi
- Mohammed Goma Ali
- Mohiedin Khalief Abdi
- Nabiil Hassan Nur
- Nail Adam
- Omar Abdalla
- Liban Barre
- Saalim Bade
- Said Salah Ahmed

=== Actors ===
- Abdi Haybe
- Abdi Muridi Dhere (Ajakis)
- Abdisalan Jimi
- Abdulkadir Mohamed Alasow
- Ciise Jawaan
- Abdulqadir Nurani
- Ali Hiran
- Awkuku
- Fathiya Saleban
- Hakima Aalin
- Halima Hila
- Iikar Jesto
- Ilka'ase
- Iman
- Jad Abdullahi
- Jeyte
- Mahamed Isman Inna
- Maki Haji Banadir
- Marshale
- Odey Abdulle
- Owdaango
- Owkoombe
- Sanqoole
- Soran Abdi Sugule
- Sharif Jeeg
- Uma Jama

== See also ==
- Arab cinema
- List of Somali films
- Somali Film Agency
- Somaliwood
- List of Somali submissions for the Academy Award for Best International Feature Film
