= List of Somali films =

The following is a list of Somali films.

== A ==
- Ali Iyo Awrala (2006)
- Ambad (2011)
- Ayaanle (2022)

== C ==
- Carara (2009)
- Charcoal Traffic (2008)
- Ciyaar Mood (1986)
- La Conchiglia (1992)

== D ==
- Dan Iyo Xarrago (1973)
- Dhig ama Dhaqo (2011)
- Dub'aad (1920s–1950s)

== F ==
- Fire Eyes (1994)

== G ==
- Geedka nolosha (1987)

== H ==
- Ha Eersan Dubai (2012)

== J ==
- Judaan 2016

== L ==
- Love Does Not Know Obstacles (1961)

== M ==
- My Cousin the Pirate (2010)
- Miyo Iyo Magaalo (1968)

== P ==
- The Parching Winds of Somalia (1984)
- Pastoral and Urban Life (1969)

== R ==
- Rajo (2003)

== S ==
- Shalaay (2005)
- Soldiers of Bronze (1920s–1950s)
- Somalia (1912)
- Somalia: Le bellezze del fiume Nebi (1913)
- The Somali Dervish (1985)
- Somalia: Gheledi (1913)
- Somalia italiana (1913)
- Sotto la Croce del Sud - Somalia Italiana (1926)

== V ==
- Viaggio di S.M. il Re in Somalia (novembre-dicembre 1934) (1934)
- Visioni della Somalia italiana (1929)

== W ==
- Warmooge (2006)

== X ==
- Xaaskayga Araweelo (2006)

== See also ==
- Cinema of Somalia
- Somali Film Agency
- Somaliwood
- List of Somali submissions for the Academy Award for Best International Feature Film
