= Abdulkadir Ahmed Said =

Abdulkadir Ahmed Said عبد القادر أحمد سعيد
- Born: 1953 (age 72–73); Mogadishu, Somalia
- Occupations: film director, producer, screenwriter, cinematographer & editor
- Years active: 1970s–present

Abdulkadir Ahmed Said (Somali: Cabdulkaadir Axmed Saciid, Arabic: عبد القادر أحمد سعيد) is a Somali film director, producer, screenwriter, cinematographer and editor.

== Biography ==
Said was born in 1953 in Mogadishu, the capital of Somalia. In 1970, he began working for the Somali Film Agency as a photographer assigned to international relations and as a consultant for productions with other countries. Between 1984 and 1986, he served as Director of Programming on Somali television, and wrote and directed several training programs.

Said worked as assistant director on numerous film productions including The Somali Dervish (1983); The Parching Winds of Somalia (1984); Riviera Somalia (1984), a program for the Italian public service broadcaster Radio Televisione Italiana (RAI); and A Man of Race (1987), produced by the LuceSaimon Film Institute.

Among his better known films include the shorts Geedka nolosha (The Tree of Life), which won the Prize of the City of Torino in the Best Film - International Short Film Competition category at the Torino International Festival of Young Cinema in 1988, and La Conchiglia from 1992.
