= Culture of Somalia =

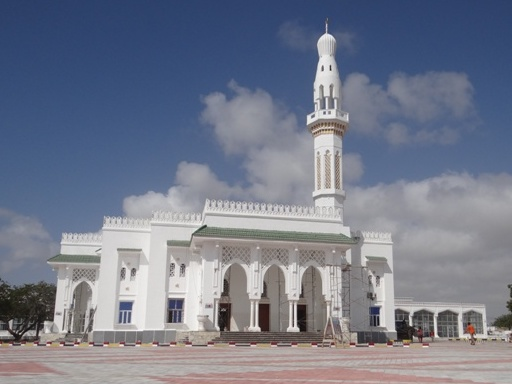
Mosque of Islamic Solidarity

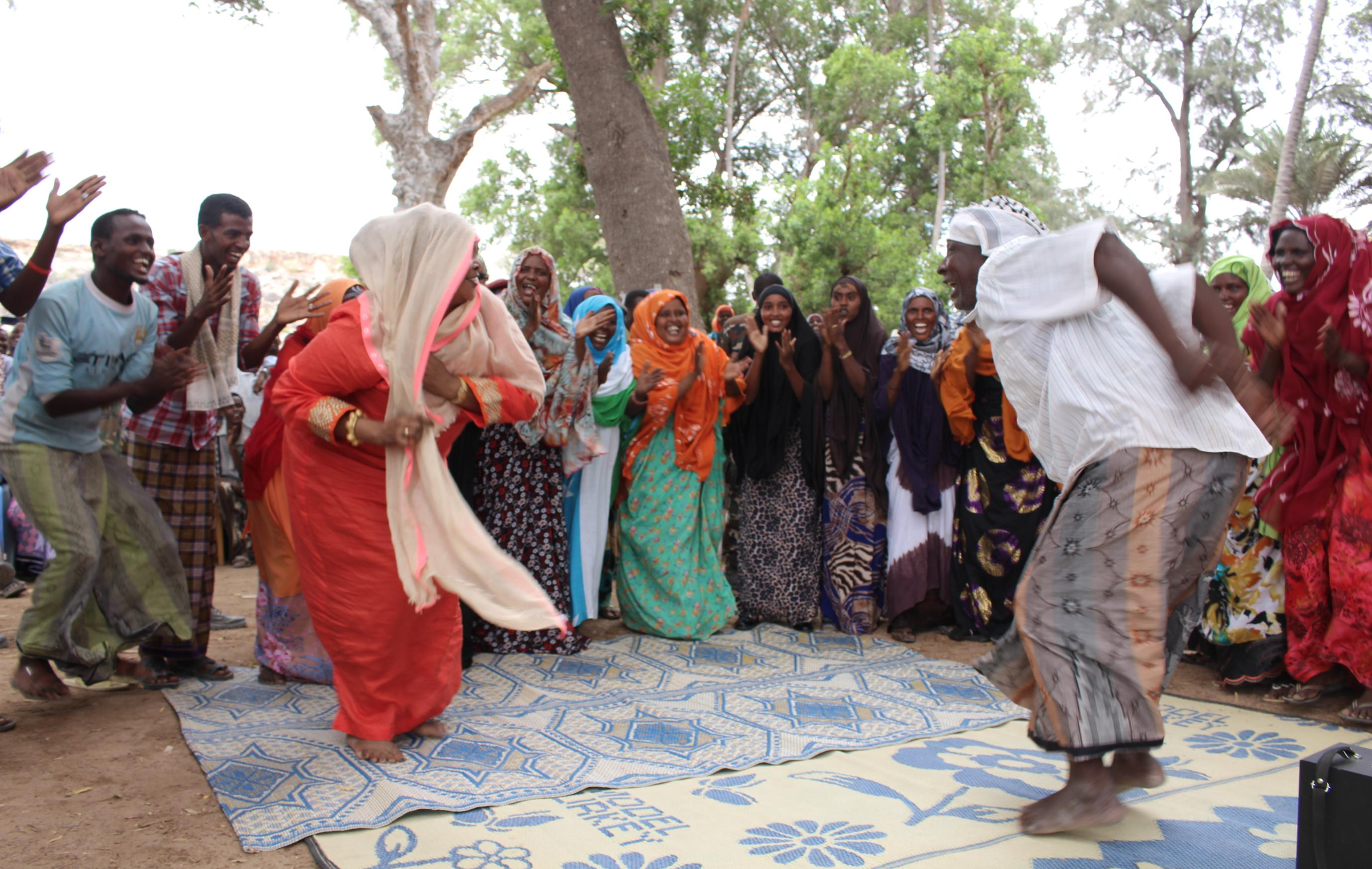
Somalis performing the folk dance called Dhaanto

The culture of Somalia is an amalgamation of traditions that were developed independently since the Proto-Somali era. The hypernym of the term Somali from a geopolitical sense is Horner and from an ethnic sense, it is Cushite.

== Overview ==
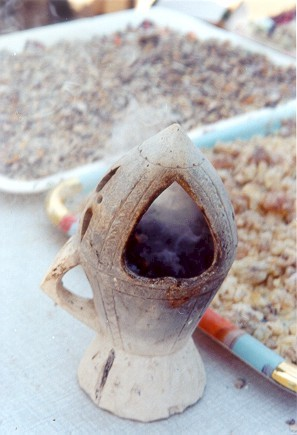
A traditional dabqaad incense burner.

The culture of Somalia encompasses knowledge, beliefs, arts, laws, and customs of the Somali people throughout history and is distinguished by a deep commitment to democratic and egalitarian principles, as well as a strong sense of independence, individualism, and generosity. It is an amalgamation of traditions developed independently, drawing on heritage from distant ancestors in Nubia and pre-dynastic Egypt, the ancient civilization of Punt, and the subsequent rise of the proto-Somali city-states known collectively as 'Barbaria'.

Somalia was among the first regions outside the Arabian Peninsula to embrace Islam and became a center of influential Islamic scholarship, exemplified by the medieval traditions of Zaylaʿi and Jabarti scholars. Much of contemporary Somalia’s territory—and adjoining Somali regions in neighboring countries—once formed the Adal Sultanate. The Sultanates of Adal and Mogadishu were vibrant hubs of trade, knowledge and culture whose globetrotting merchants and longstanding diasporic communities exchanged goods and ideas across the Indian Ocean. This cosmopolitan legacy is reflected in Somalia’s rich oral heritage, expressed through poetry, song, and proverbs celebrated for their wit and eloquence.

Traditional games such as Googaalaysi are noted to require a keen sense of humor and wit, combined with physical courage and mental acuity, with a goal to entertain and impart practical knowledge. Today, Somalia and its global diaspora continue to contribute to business, fashion, music, trade, and science and technology.

The cultural diffusion of Somali commercial enterprise can be detected in its exotic cuisine, which contains Southeast Asian influences. Due to the Somali people's foremost ingenuity and facility with poetry, Somalia has often been referred to as a "Nation of Poets" and a "Nation of Bards", as, for example, by the Canadian novelist Margaret Laurence. Somalis have a story-telling tradition.

According to Canadian novelist and scholar Margaret Laurence, who originally coined the term "Nation of Poets" to describe the Somali Peninsular, the Eidagale clan were viewed as "the recognized experts in the composition of poetry" by their fellow Somali contemporaries:

Among the tribes, the Eidagalla are the recognized experts in the composition of poetry. One individual poet of the Eidagalla may be no better than a good poet of another tribe, but the Eidagalla appear to have more poets than any other tribe. "if you had a hundred Eidagalla men here," Hersi Jama once told me, "And asked which of them could sing his own gabei ninety-five would be able to sing. The others would still be learning."

Somalis have a rich musical heritage centered on traditional Somali folklore. Most Somali songs are pentatonic; that is, they only use five pitches per octave in contrast to a heptatonic (seven note) scale such as the major scale.

Somali art is the artistic culture of the Somali people, both historic and contemporary. These include artistic traditions in pottery, music, architecture, wood carving and other genres. Somali art is characterized by its aniconism, partly as a result of the vestigial influence of the pre-Islamic mythology of the Somalis coupled with their ubiquitous Muslim beliefs. The country's shape gives a united country the nickname toddobo (seven).

== Pan-Somalism ==
Somali nationalism (Somali: Soomaalinimo) is centered on the notion that the Somali people share a common language, religion, culture and ethnicity, and as such constitute a nation unto themselves. Its earliest manifestations has its roots in the Middle Ages with the Adal Sultanate and the Ajuran Sultanate. In the contemporary era it is often traced back to Muḥammad ibn 'Abdallāh Hassan, who was known as the "Mad Mullah" by the British Empire throughout the Scramble for Africa. The Somali Youth League, a political organisation founded in 1943 was one of the most influential political parties in Somalia prior to the country's unification and independence in the 1960s.

=== Notable Pan-Somalists ===
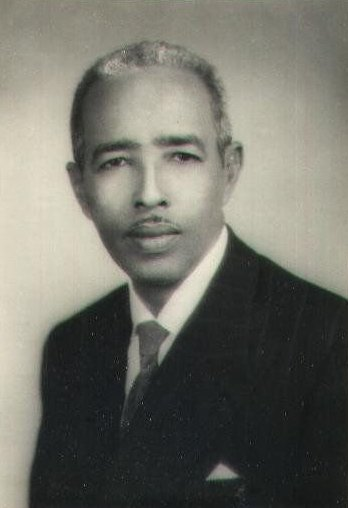
Former leader of the Somali Youth League Aden Abdullah Osman Daar who eventually became the first President of the Somali Republic following the union of State of Somaliland and Italian Trusteeship of Somalia.

- Rasul ibn 'Ali, sultan of the Ajuran Sultanate
- Mohammed Abdullah Hassan fought colonialists with the Dervishes during the Scramble for Africa.
- Sultan Nur Ahmed Aman (1841–1907) - Sultan of the Habr Yunis and one of the founders of the Somali Dervish movement
- Haji Sudi - One of the founding members of the Dervish movement and Second in command after Mohamed Abdullah Hassan.
- Mohamoud Ali Shire – 26th Sultan of the Warsangali Sultanate (1897–1960).
- Hawo Tako (d.1948) – Early 20th century Somali female nationalist whose sacrifice became a symbol for Pan-Somalism.
- Bashir Yussuf (b. 1905–1945) – Somali nationalist and religious leader.
- Abdullahi Issa (b. 1922–1988) – First Prime Minister of Somalia.
- Aden Abdullah Osman Daar (7 January 1960 – 10 June 1967) – First President of Somalia.
- Abdirashid Ali Shermarke (10 June 1967 – 15 October 1969) – Second President of Somalia.
- Hirsi Bulhan Farah – Former Minister in the civilian government of the 1960s, political prisoner and Pan-Somalist.
- Siad Barre (b. 1919 – 2 January 1995) – Third President of Somalia.
- Jama Korshel – Somali National Army General, former Head of Somali Police, and commander in the Supreme Revolutionary Council.
- Daud Abdulle Hirsi (1925–1965) – Prominent Somali General considered the Father of the Somali Military.
- Mahmoud Harbi – active Pan-Somalist that came close to uniting Djibouti with Somalia in the 1970s.
- Salaad Gabeyre Kediye – Major General in the Somali military and a revolutionary.
- Abdirizak Haji Hussein – Former Prime Minister of Somalia (1964–1967) and Somali Youth League leader.
- Sheikh Mukhtar Mohamed Hussein, speaker of parliament, from 1965 to 1969 and interim President of Somalia before the coup d'état in 1969.
- Abdullahi Ahmed Irro – General in the Somali National Army; established the National Academy for Strategy.
- Michael Mariano legendary politician and diplomat, SYL member and advocate for occupied Somalis
- Ali Matan Hashi – Brigadier General and politician; first Somali Air Force pilot, the father of Somali Air Force and a prominent member of the Supreme Revolutionary Council.
- Abdirahman Jama Barre – Former Minister of Foreign Affairs and Minister of Finance of Somalia.
- Haji Bashir Ismail Yusuf – First President of the Somali National Assembly and prominent Somali Youth League member.
- Osman Haji Mohamed – Prominent Somali Youth League member and parliamentarian.
- Abdullahi Yusuf Ahmed – President of Somalia, Colonel in Somali National Army, and commander during WSLF campaign.
- Omar Osman Rabeh – Pan-Somalist that has written many works on Somali nationalism.
- Mohamed Ainanshe Guleid, Major General in the Somali National Army and Vice president of the Somali Democratic Republic
- Mohamed Farah Aidid – Prominent Somali military commander and political leader. A former general and diplomat, he was the chairman of the United Somali Congress (USC) and later led the Somali National Alliance (SNA). In 1992, Aidid attacked American troops in the nation. He was one of the main targets of the Unified Task Force. Eventually forcing United States forces to withdraw from Somalia in 1995.

== Religion ==
With very few exceptions, Somalis are entirely Muslims, the majority belonging to the Sunni branch of Islam and the Shafi‘i school of Islamic jurisprudence. There are two theories about when Somalis began adopting Islam. One states that the religion entered the region very early on, as a group of persecuted Muslims had, at Prophet Muhummad's urging, sought refuge across the Red Sea in the Horn of Africa. Islam may thus have been introduced into Somalia well before the faith even took root in its place of origin. An alternate theory states that Islam was brought to the coastal settlements of Somalia between the 7th and the 10th century by seafaring Arab and Persian merchants. Somali Sufi religious orders (tariqa) – the Qadiriyya, the Ahmadiya and the Salihiyya – in the form of Muslim brotherhoods have played a major role in Somali Islam and the modern era history of Somalia.

Of the three orders, the less strict Qaadiriya tariqa is the oldest, and it is the sect to which most Somalis belong. The Qaadiriya order is named after Shaikh Muhiuddin Abdul Qadir Gilani of Baghdad. I. M. Lewis states that Qaadiriya has a high reputation for maintaining a higher standard of Islamic instruction than its rivals.

Ahmadiyah and its sub-sect Salihiyyah preached a puritanical form of Islam, and have rejected the popular Sufi practice of tawassul (visiting the tombs of saints to ask mediation). B. G. Martin states that these two orders shared some of the views of the Wahhabis of Arabia. The religious differences between Qaadiriya and Salihiyya were controversial, as Salihis continued to oppose the Qadiris' practice of tawassul, and claimed the act to be invalid and improper religious activity. The Ahmadiya has the smallest number of adherents of the three orders.

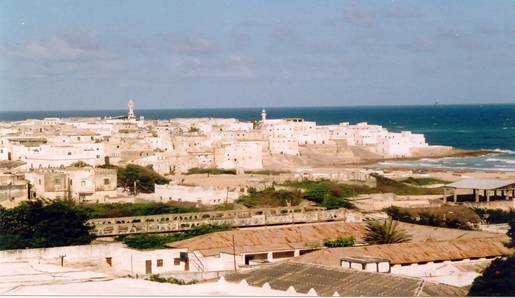
Merca is an ancient Islamic center in Somalia.

Qur'anic schools (also known as dugsi) remain the basic system of traditional religious instruction in Somalia. It is delivered in Arabic. They provide Islamic education for children. According to the UNICEF, the dugsi system where the content is based on Quran, teaches the greatest number of students and enjoys high parental support, is oftentimes the only system accessible to Somalis in nomadic as compared to urban areas. A study from 1993 found, among other things, that "unlike in primary schools where gender disparity is enormous, around 40 per cent of Qur'anic school pupils are girls; but the teaching staff have minimum or no qualification necessary to ensure intellectual development of children." To address these concerns, the Somali government on its own part subsequently established the Ministry of Endowment and Islamic Affairs, under which Qur'anic education is now regulated.

The Somali community has produced important Muslim figures over the centuries, many of whom have significantly shaped the course of Islamic learning and practice in the Horn of Africa and the Muslim world.

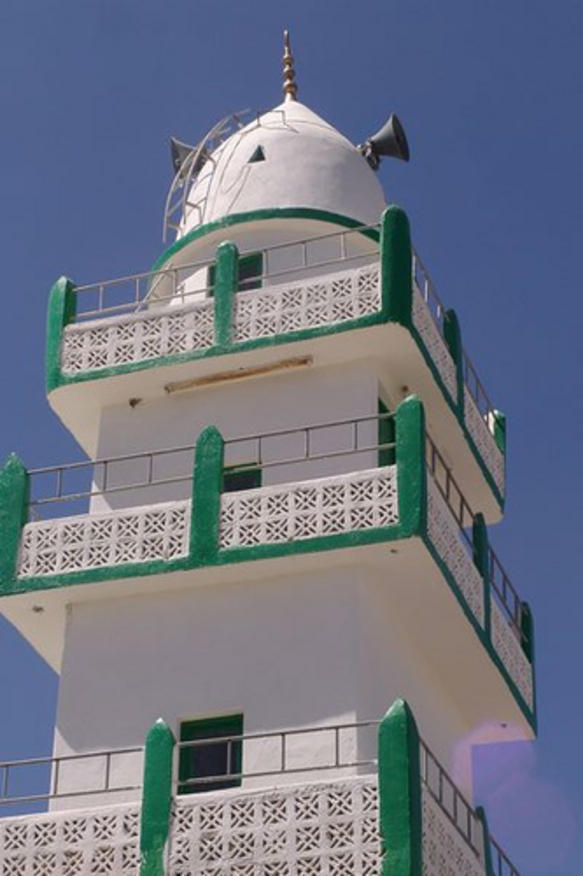
Mosque in Borama, Somaliland

Although Pew Research Center has not conducted a survey in Somalia, its Somali-majority northwestern neighbour Djibouti reported a creed breakdown of Muslims which was reported as 77% adhering to Sunnism, 8% as non-denominational Muslim, 2% as Shia, thirteen percent refusing to answer, and a further report inclusive of Somali Region stipulating 2% adherence to a minority sect (e.g. Ibadism, Quranism etc.). Somali Sunnis primarily belong to Shafi`i school of Islamic jurisprudence, or are adherents to the Salafi creed. Sufism, the mystical dimension of Islam, is also well-established, with many local jama'a (zawiya) or congregations of the various tariiqa or Sufi orders. The constitution of Somalia likewise defines Islam as the religion of the Somali Republic, and Islamic Sharia as the basic source for national legislation.

Although Somali women were initially excluded from the many male-dominated religious orders, the all-female institution Abay Siti was formed in the late 19th century, incorporating Somali tradition and Islam.

In addition, the Somali community has produced numerous important Islamic figures over the centuries, many of whom have significantly shaped the course of Muslim learning and practice in the Horn of Africa, the Arabian Peninsula, and well beyond. Among these Islamic scholars is the 14th century Somali theologian and jurist Uthman bin Ali Zayla'i of Zeila, who wrote the single most authoritative text on the Hanafi school of Islam, consisting of four volumes known as the Tabayin al-Haqa’iq li Sharh Kanz al-Daqa’iq.

=== Important Islamic figures ===
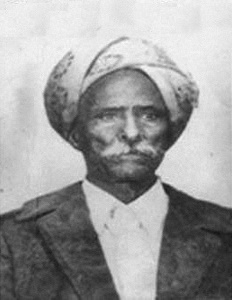
Sheikh Ali Ayanle Samatar, a prominent Somali Islamic scholar.

- Abdirahman bin Isma'il al-Jabarti – 10th century Islamic leader in Waqooyi Bari.
- Sheikh Isaaq Bin Ahmed Al Hashimi – 12th century Islamic leader in Somaliland
- Sheikh Ahmed Bin Abdulrahman Bin Uthman – 10th-century saint and Islamic scholar referred to as master of the Islamic sciences.
- Yusuf bin Ahmad al-Kawneyn – 13th century scholar, philosopher and saint. Associated with the development of Wadaad's writing.
- Abadir Umar ar-Rida – 13th century Sheikh and patron saint of Harar.
- Uthman bin Ali Zayla'i – 14th century Somali theologian and jurist who wrote the single most authoritative text on the Hanafi school of Islam, consisting of four volumes known as the Tabayin al-Haqa’iq li Sharh Kanz al-Daqa’iq.
- Sa'id of Mogadishu – 14th century Somali scholar and traveler. His reputation as a scholar earned him audiences with the Emirs of Mecca and Medina. He travelled across the Muslim world and visited Bengal and China.
- Ahmad ibn Ibrahim al-Ghazi (c. 1507 – 21 February 1543) – 16th century Imam and military leader that led the Conquest of Abyssinia.
- Nur ibn Mujahid – 16th century Somali Emir and patron saint of Harar.
- Rasul ibn 'Ali - sultan of the Ajuran Sultanate
- Sharaf al-Din Isma'il al-Jabarti (d. 1403) – 14th century Somali scholar and politician in the Rasulid Yemen.
- Ali al-Jabarti (d. 1492) – 15th century Somali scholar and politician in the Mamluk Empire.
- Hassan al-Jabarti (d. 1774) – Somali mathematician, theologian, astronomer and philosopher; considered one of the great scholars of the 18th century.
- Abd al-Rahman al-Jabarti (1753–1825) – Somali scholar living in Cairo that recorded the Napoleonic invasion of Egypt.
- Abd al Aziz al-Amawi (1832–1896) – 19th century influential Somali diplomat, historian, poet, jurist and scholar living in the Sultanate of Zanzibar.
- Shaykh Abd Al-Rahman bin Ahmad al-Zayla'i (1820–1882) – Somali scholar who played a crucial role in the spread of the Qadiriyyah movement in Somalia and East Africa.
- Sheikh Madar (1825–1918) - Influential 19th & 20th century Qadiriyya leader and founder of the Hargeisa tariqa
- Shaykh Sufi (1829–1904) – 19th century Somali scholar, poet, reformist and astrologer.
- Sheikh Uways Al-Barawi (1847–1909) – Somali scholar credited reviving Islam in 19th century East Africa and with followers in Yemen and Indonesia.
- Mohammed Abdullah Hassan (1856–1920) – emir of the Dervishes
- Abdallah al-Qutbi (1879–1952) – Somali polemicist theologian and philosopher; best known for his five-part Al-Majmu'at al-mubaraka ("The Blessed Collection"), published in Cairo.
- Sheikh Muhammad al-Sumali (1910–2005) – Somali scholar and teacher in the Masjid Al-Haram in Mecca. He influenced many of the prominent Islamic scholars of today.

== Languages ==
The Somali language is the official language of Somalia. It is a member of the Cushitic branch of the Afro-Asiatic language family, and its nearest relatives are the Afar and saho languages. Somali is the best documented of the Cushitic languages, with academic studies of it dating from before 1900.

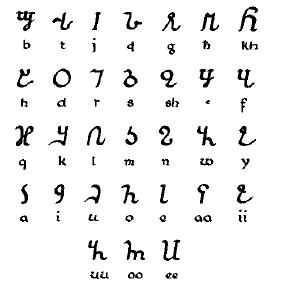
The Osmanya writing script.

Somali dialects are divided into three main groups: Northern, Benaadir and Maay. Northern Somali (or Northern-Central Somali) forms the basis for Standard Somali. Benaadir (also known as Coastal Somali) is spoken on the Benadir coast from Adale to south of Merca, including Mogadishu, as well as in the immediate hinterland. The coastal dialects have additional phonemes which do not exist in Standard Somali. Maay is principally spoken by the Digil and Mirifle (Rahanweyn) clans in the southern areas of Somalia.

Since Somali had long lost its ancient script, a number of writing systems have been used over the years for transcribing the language. Of these, the Somali alphabet is the most widely used, and has been the official writing script in Somalia since the government of former President of Somalia Siad Barre formally introduced it in October 1972.

The script was developed by a number of leading scholars of Somali, including Musa Haji Ismail Galal, B. W. Andrzejewski and Shire Jama Ahmed specifically for transcribing the Somali language, and uses all letters of the English Latin alphabet except p, v and z. Besides Ahmed's Latin script, other orthographies that have been used for centuries for writing Somali include the long-established Arabic script and Wadaad's writing. Indigenous writing systems developed in the twentieth century include the Osmanya, Borama and Kaddare scripts, which were invented by Osman Yusuf Kenadid, Sheikh Abdurahman Sheikh Nuur and Hussein Sheikh Ahmed Kaddare, respectively.

In addition to Somali, Arabic is an official national language of Somalia. Many Somalis speak it due to centuries-old ties with the Arab World, the far-reaching influence of the Arabic media, and religious education.

English is also widely used and taught. Italian used to be a major language, but its influence significantly diminished following independence. It is now most frequently heard among older generations who were in contact with the Italians at that time or later as migrants into Italy. Other minority languages include Bravanese, a variant of the Bantu Swahili language that is spoken along the coast by the Bravanese people.

== Somali clans ==
Somali clans are patrilineal kinship groups based on agnatic descent of the Somali people. Tradition and folklore connects the origin of the Somali population by language and way of life, and societal organisations, by customs, and by a feeling of belonging to a broader family among individuals from the Arabian Peninsula. The Somali people are mainly divided among five patrilineal clans, the Hawiye, Darod, Rahanweyn, Dir, and Isaaq. The average person is able to trace his/her ancestry generations back. Somali clans in contemporary times have an established official structure in the country's political system, acknowledged by a mathematical formula for equitably distributing seats between the clans in the Federal Parliament of Somalia. The Somali concept of ‘Abtirsi’ refers to a systematically organized lineage-based registry or list of paternal ancestors among Somalis. This lineage starts with the individual’s father and extends to include the grandfather, great-grandfather, and so forth, ultimately culminating at the patriarch of the broader clan-family from which the individual is descended.

"Somalis themselves are very much busy with this idea and cherish it as a cultural ideology."

== Attire ==
=== Men ===
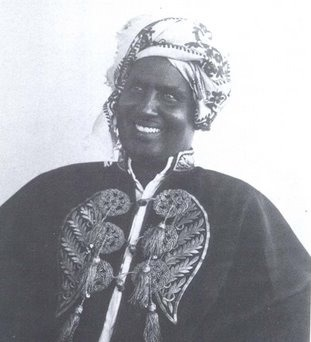
Somali wearing the traditional Jubbad over a Khamiis (Thawb) and a Emama(Turban)

When not dressed in Westernized clothing such as jeans and t-shirts, Somali men traditionally wear the macawis (ma'awiis), which is a sarong-like garment worn around the waist and a large cloth wrapped around the upper part of their body. On their heads, they often wrap a colorful turban or wear the koofiyad, an embroidered taqiyah.

Due to Somalia's proximity to and close ties with the Muslim world, many Somali men also wear the Thawb (khamiis in Somali), a long white garment common among Muslims.

The Jubbad, a ceremonial outer robe, similar to the Bisht richly decorated with embroidery and tassels, along with a turban is the traditional attire for upper class men. Traditionally Somali attire for rural men consisted of two sheets (often plain white), one draped over the shoulder and the other tied around the waist. The sheet sometimes had embroidery, patterns or laced borders. This attire is no longer common though it can be found in some rural communities.

=== Women ===
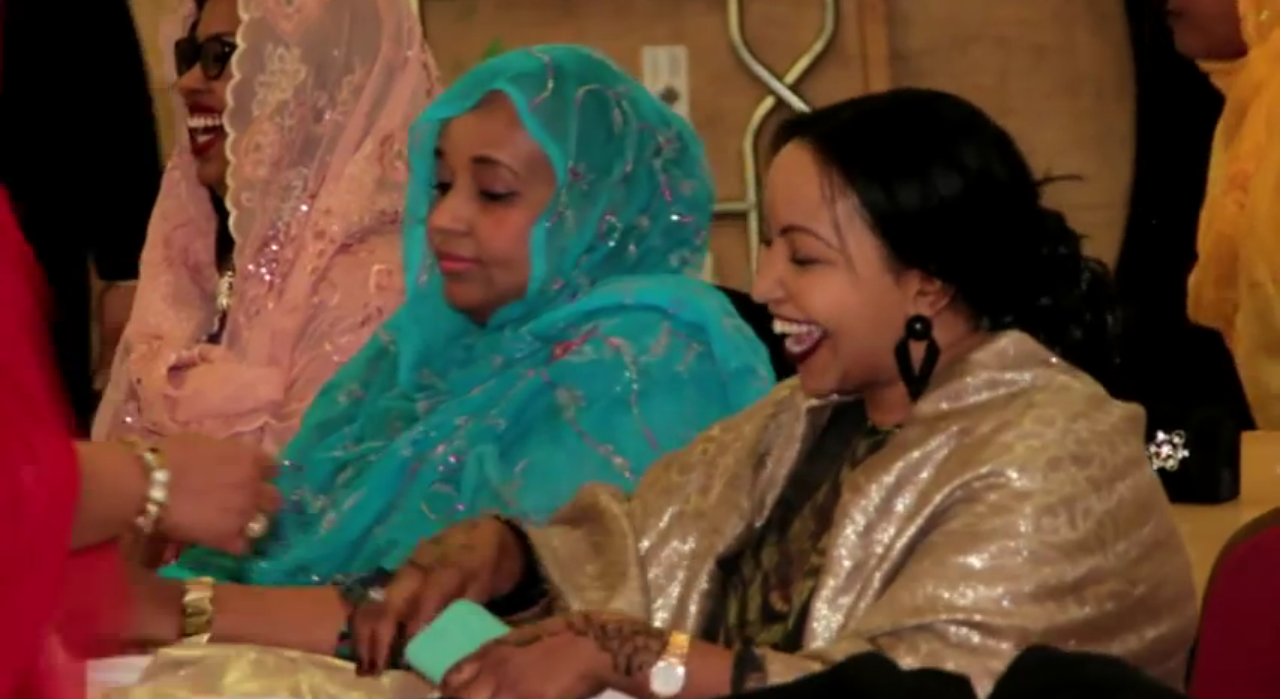
Somali women in traditional dirac and shash

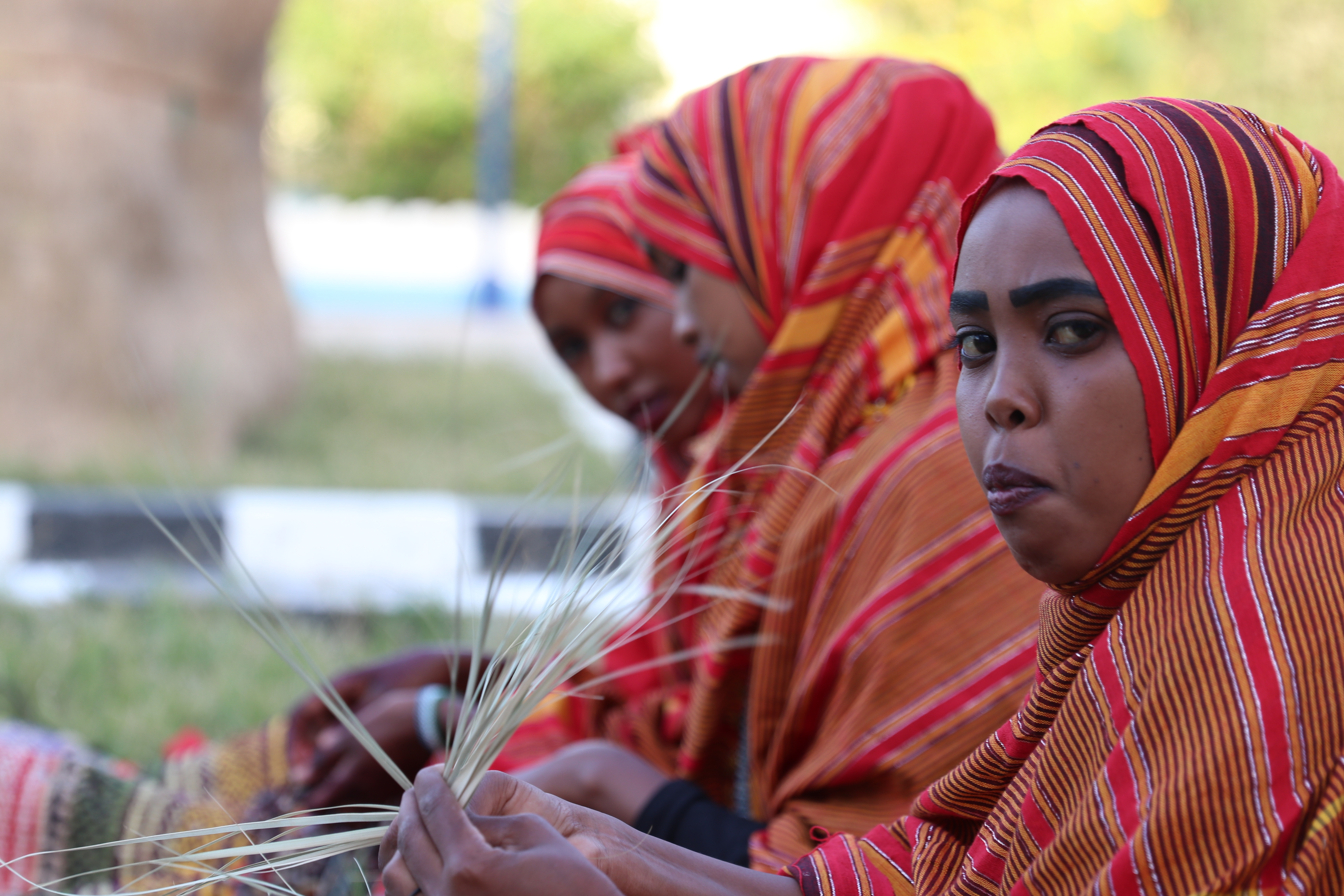
Somali women basket weaving

During regular, day-to-day activities, women usually wear the guntiino, a long stretch of cloth tied over the shoulder and draped around the waist. The guntiino is traditionally made out of plain white fabric sometimes featuring with decorative borders, although nowadays alindi, a textile common in the Horn region and some parts of North Africa, is more frequently used. The garment can be worn in many different styles and with different fabrics.

For more formal settings such as weddings or religious celebrations like Eid, women wear the dirac, a long, light, diaphanous voile dress made of cotton or polyester fabric. It is worn over a full-length half-slip and a brassiere. Known as the gorgorad, the underskirt is made out of silk and serves as a key part of the overall outfit. The dirac is usually sparkly and very colorful, the most popular styles being those with gilded borders or threads. The fabric is typically acquired from Somali clothing stores in tandem with the gorgorad. In more informal settings, like being at home, Somali women typically wear baati. A baati is a long dress-like wear that is made out of comfortable polyester.

Married women tend to sport head-scarves referred to as shash, and also often cover their upper body with a shawl known as garbasaar. A garbasaar can be worn by any woman regardless of their marital status. In general, however, Somali women cover up with hijab when outside their home or in the presence of men outside of the immediate family (cousins, uncles, friends).

Additionally, Somali women have a long tradition of wearing gold and silver jewelry, particularly bangles. During weddings, the bride is frequently adorned in gold. Many Somali women by tradition also wear gold necklaces and anklets. The xirsi, an Islamic necklace likewise donned in Ethiopia and Yemen, is frequently worn.

== Art ==
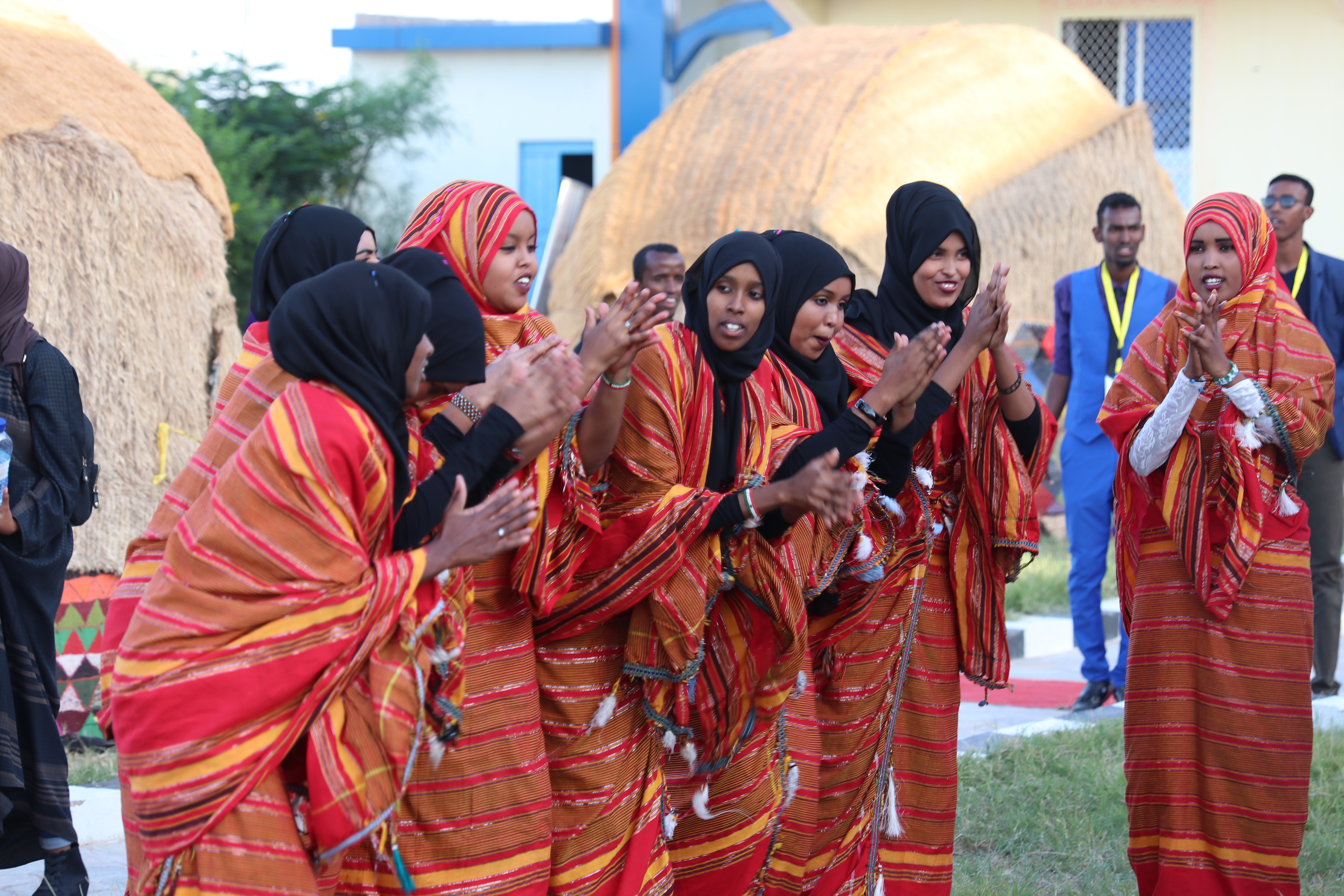
Somali women performing a traditional dance

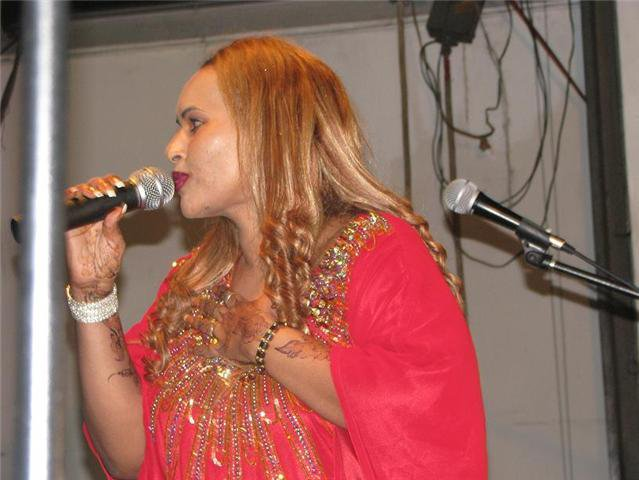
Somali singer Fartuun Birimo wearing henna hand and arm designs.

Somali art is the artistic culture of the Somali people, both historic and contemporary. These include artistic traditions in pottery, music, architecture, wood carving and other genres. Somali art is characterized by its aniconism, partly as a result of the vestigial influence of the pre-Islamic mythology of the Somalis coupled with their ubiquitous Muslim beliefs. However, there have been instances in the past of artistic depictions representing living creatures such as the golden birds on the Mogadishan canopies, the camels and horses on the ancient rock paintings in northern Somalia, and the plant decorations on religious tombs in southern Somalia, but these are considered rare. Instead, intricate patterns and geometric designs, bold colors and monumental architecture were the norm.

Additionally, henna is an important part of Somali culture. It is worn by Somali women on their hands, arms, feet and neck during weddings, Eid, Ramadan, and other festive occasions. Somali henna designs are similar to other east African peoples, often featuring flower motifs and triangular shapes. The palm is also frequently decorated with a dot of henna, and the fingertips are dipped in the dye. Henna parties are usually held before the wedding ceremony takes place.

== Customs and courtesies ==
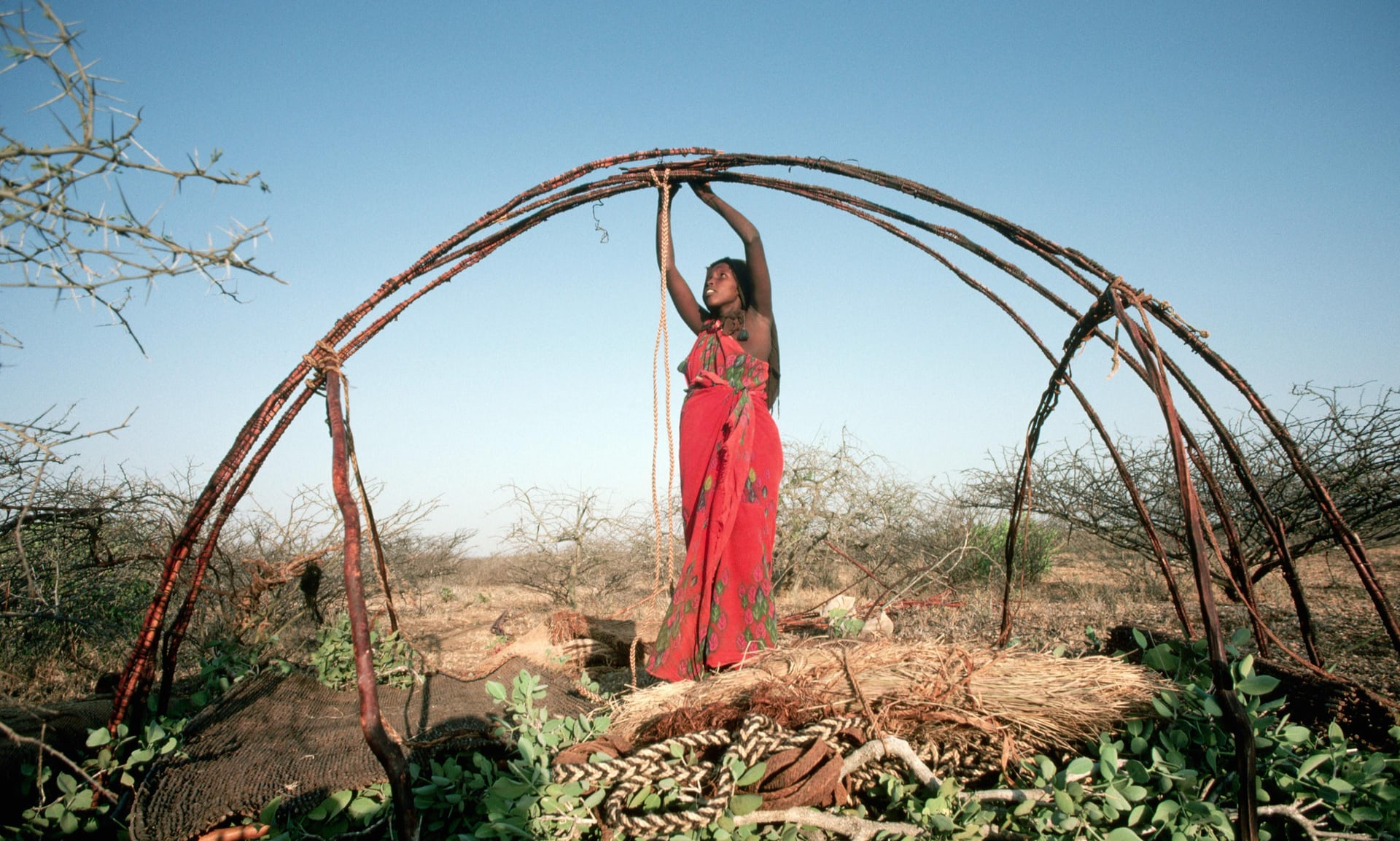
Somali woman building a Somali house

Somalis warmly greet each other with handshakes, but shaking hands with the opposite sex is avoided by many. Common verbal greetings include:

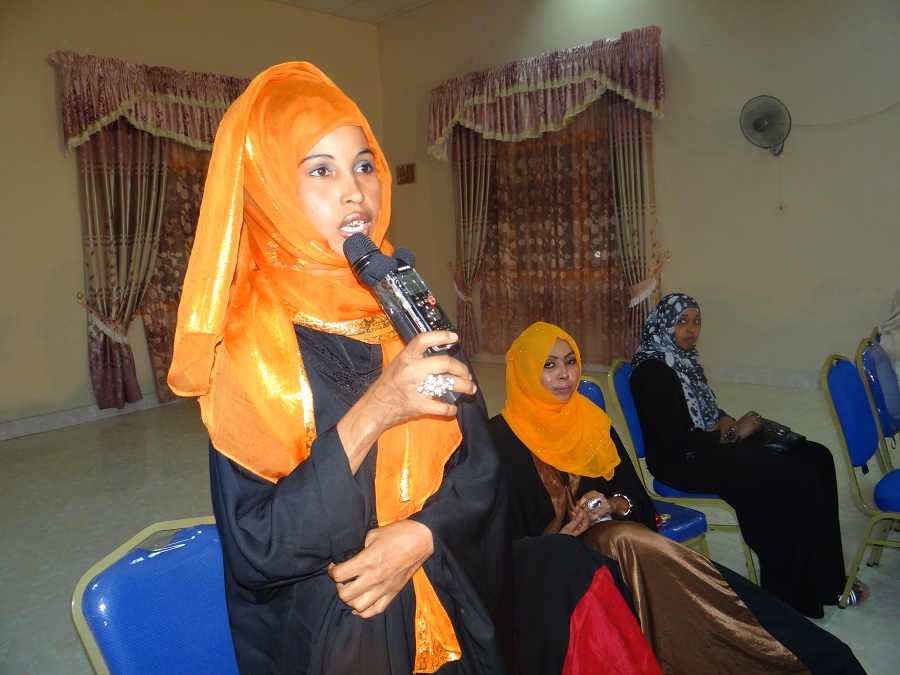
Somali woman in Hargeisa opening speech with traditional greeting.

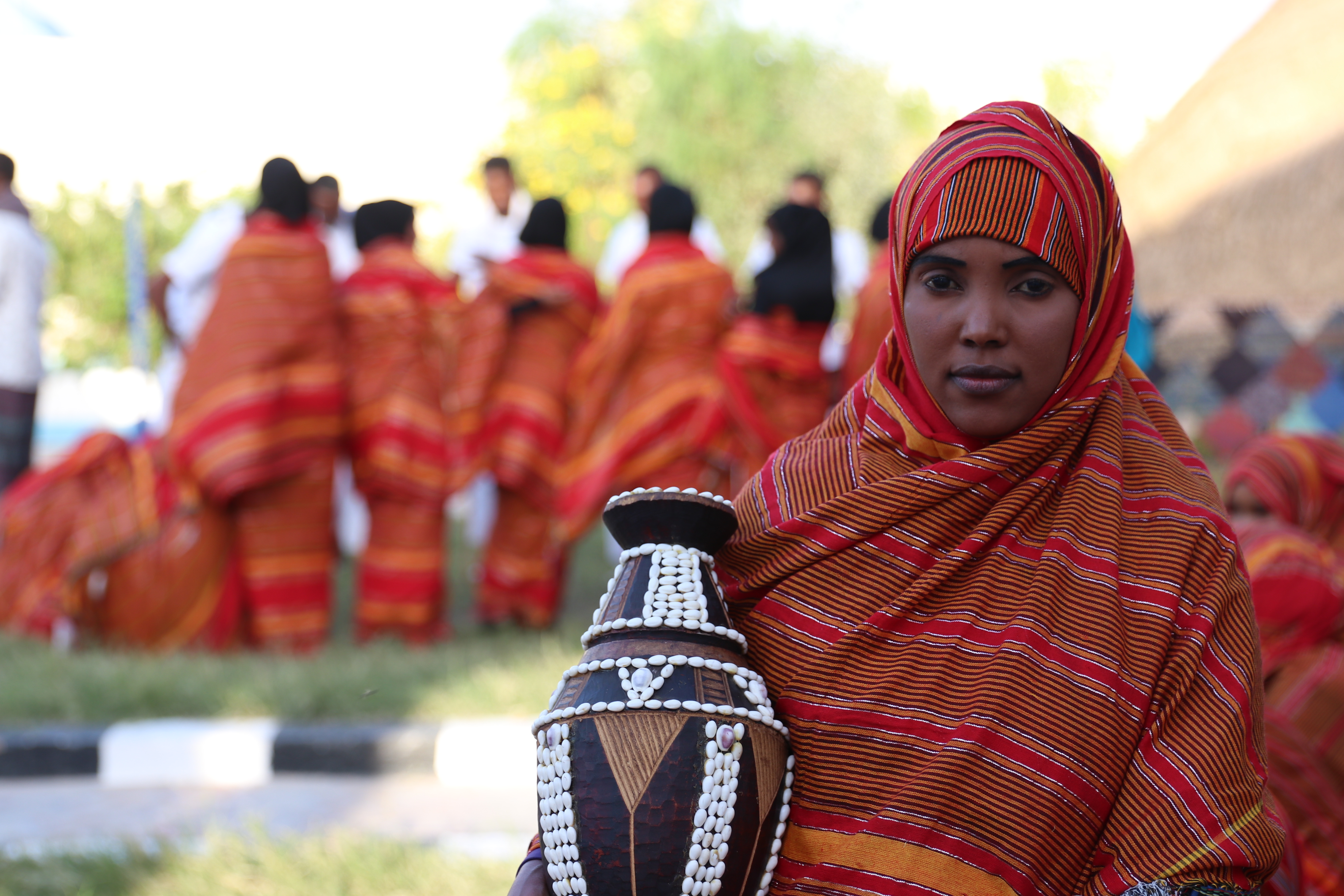
A Somali woman showing a decorated pottery

Common verbal phrases include;

- Assalamu aleikum (Peace be upon you)
- Maalin wanaagsan (good day/morning)
- Galab wanaagsan (good afternoon)
- Habeen wanaagsan (good night)
- Iska warran and Ii waran (How are you?)
- Nabad (I'm fine or literally translated meaning ( peace)

Somalis use sweeping hand and arm gestures to dramatize speech. Many ideas are expressed through specific hand gestures. Most of these gestures are performed by women:

- A swift twist of the open hand means "nothing" or "no".
- Snapping fingers may mean "long ago" or and "so on"
- A thumb under the chin indicates "fullness".
- It is impolite to point the sole of one's foot or shoe at another person.
- It is impolite to use the index finger to call somebody; that gesture is used for calling dogs.

During the Siad Barre era, a new greeting intended to combat the prevalence of clannism was introduced called jaale, which in Somali has dual meanings, including the color yellow and comrade or friend.

== Literature ==
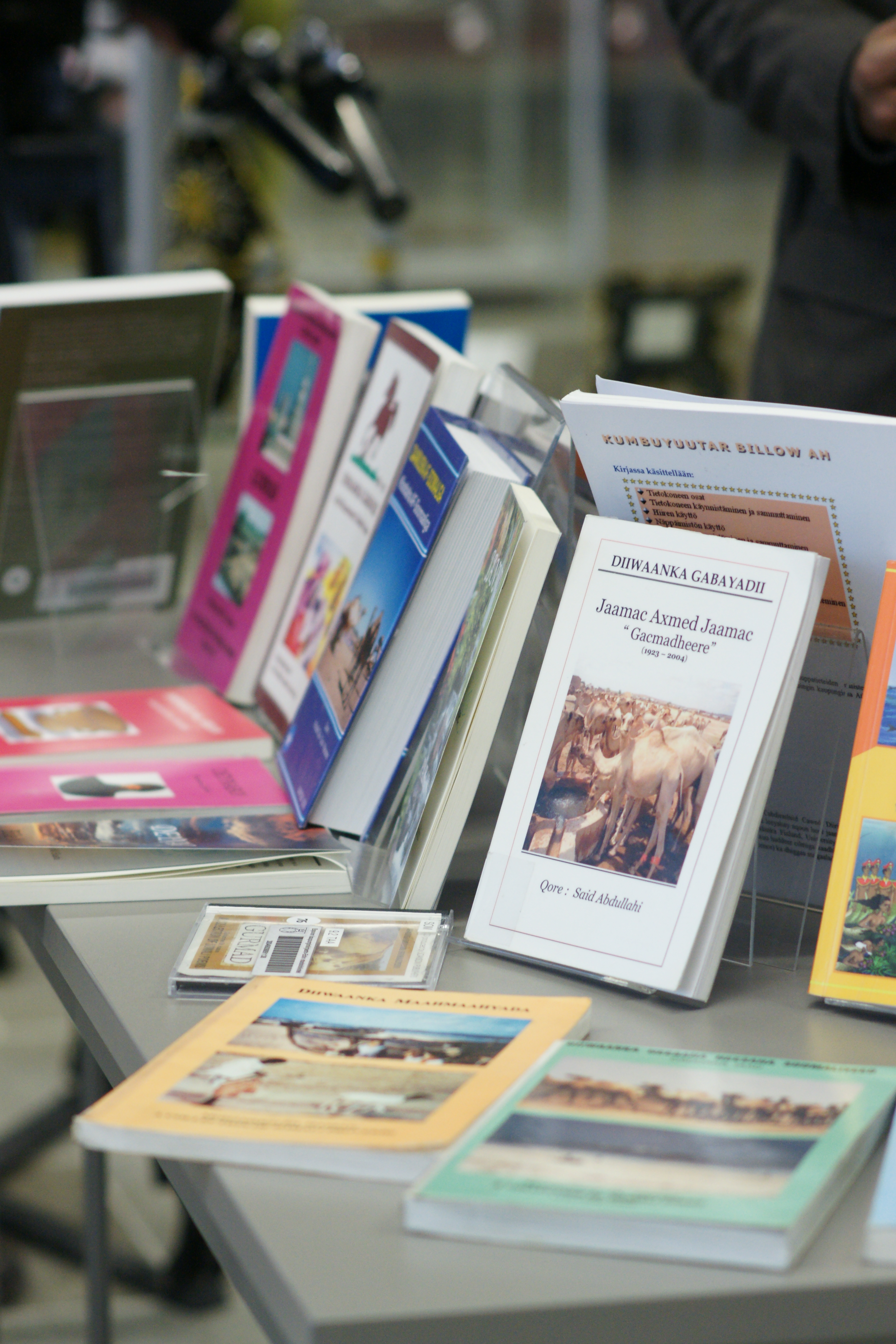
Somali language books on display.

Somali scholars have for centuries produced many notable examples of Islamic literature ranging from poetry to Hadith. With the adoption of the Latin alphabet in 1972 to transcribe the Somali language, numerous contemporary Somali authors have also released novels, some of which have gone on to receive worldwide acclaim. Of these modern writers, Nuruddin Farah is probably the most celebrated. Books such as From a Crooked Rib and Links are considered important literary achievements, works which have earned Farah, among other accolades, the 1998 Neustadt International Prize for Literature. Farah Mohamed Jama Awl is another prominent Somali writer who is perhaps best known for his Dervish era novel, Ignorance is the enemy of love. Mohamed Ibrahim Warsame is considered by many to be the greatest living Somali poet, and several of his works have been translated internationally.

== Sport ==
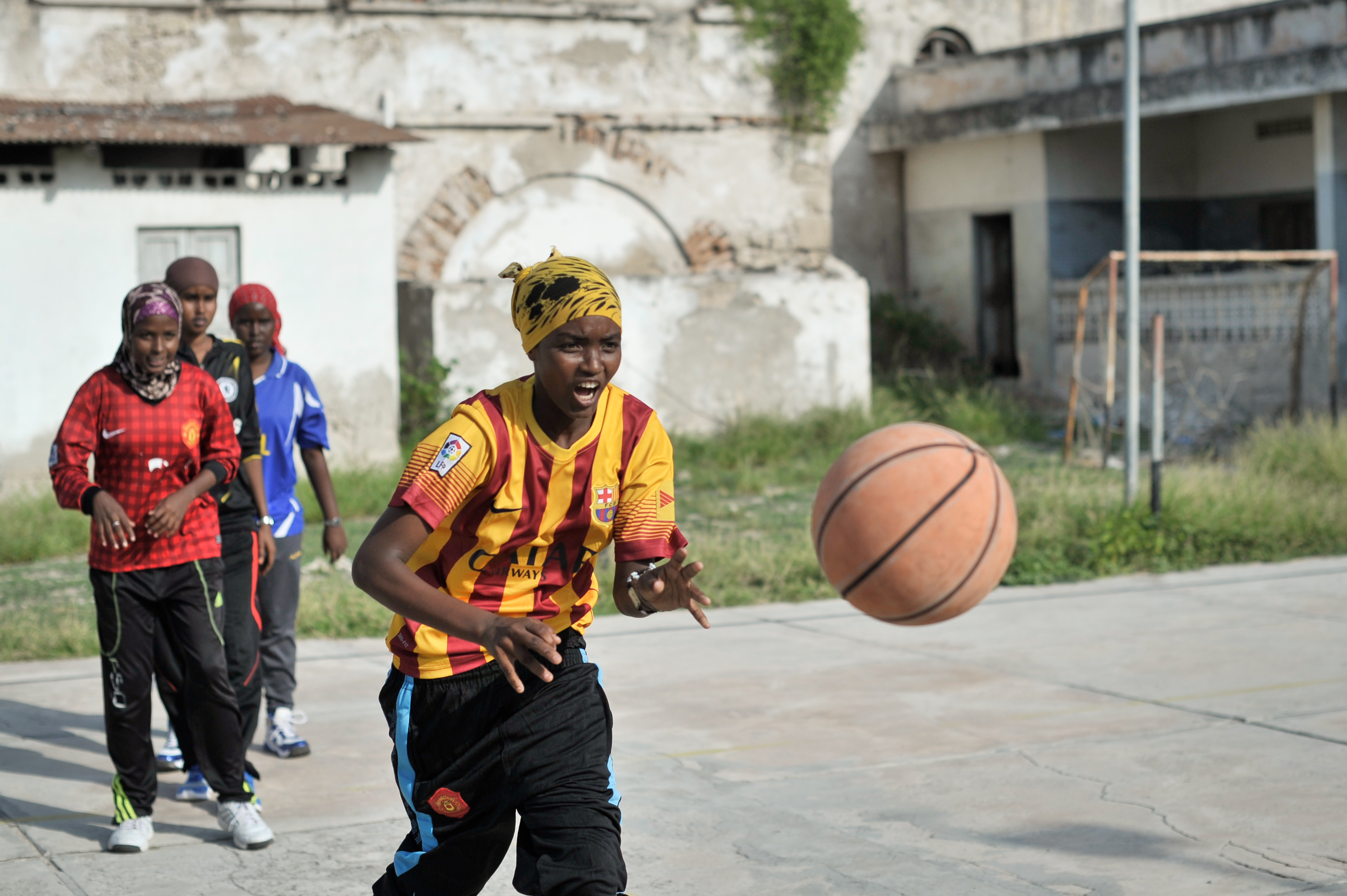
A girl plays basketball during a training session in Mogadishu, 2013.

Football, or soccer, is the most popular sport in Somalia. Important domestic competitions are the Somalia League and Somalia Cup, with the Somalia national football team playing internationally.

Basketball is also played in the country. The FIBA Africa Championship 1981 was hosted in Mogadishu from December 15 to December 23, 1981, during which the national basketball team received the bronze medal.

Abdi Bile was the first athlete from Somalia to win a gold medal at the IAAF World Championships in Athletics when he became 1500 metre champion at the 1987 World Championships. Mo Farah has also won three World Championship golds and two Olympic golds at the 2012 London Olympics in the 5000 and 10,000 metres.

In the martial arts, Faisal Jeylani Aweys and Mohamed Deq Abdulle took home a silver medal and fourth place, respectively, at the 2013 Open World Taekwondo Challenge Cup in Tongeren. The Somali National Olympic committee has devised a special support program to ensure continued success in future tournaments. Additionally, Mohamed Jama has won both world and European titles in K1 and Thai Boxing.

== See also ==
- Cinema of Somalia
- Music of Somalia
- Somali cuisine
- Somaliwood
