= Keydmedia Online =

- Website type: News website
- Available in: Somali, English
- Headquarters: Mogadishu, Somalia
- Owner: Ali Said Hassan
- Website: www.keydmedia.net
- Commercial: yes
- Launched: 16 July 2010; 16 years ago

Keydmedia Online is an independently operated news agency based in Mogadishu, Somalia.

== Programs ==
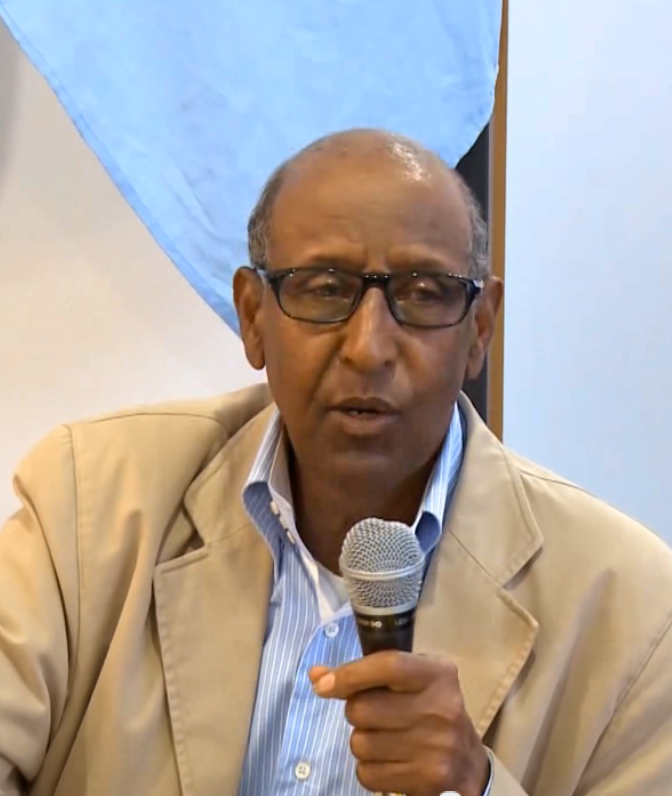
Ali Said Hassan, founder of Keydmedia Online

Keydmedia Online aims to present objective news on Somalia to domestic and international readers through articles, editorials and audiovisual materials.

Emphasis is placed on interviews with local politicians on the country's direction. Through its global network of experienced journalists, the organization also strives to provide broad-based coverage and adhere to the ethics of journalism.

It presents news in Somali and English.

== Management ==
Keydmedia Online was founded in 2010 by Somali filmmaker Ali Said Hassan. It is dedicated to the Somali community worldwide.

== See also ==
- Media of Somalia
