= Beden =

Traditional design Somali sailing vessel

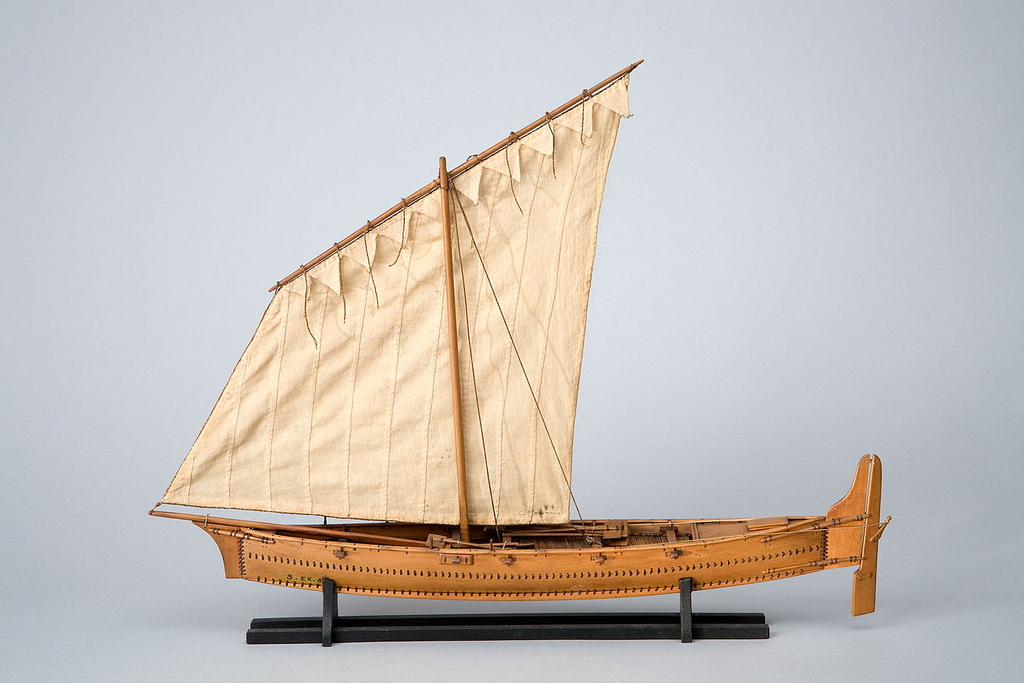
Model of a Somali beden

The beden or alternate type names beden-seyed (also beden seyad) and beden-safar, is a fast, ancient Somali single or double-masted maritime vessel and ship, typified by its towering stern-post and powerful rudder. It is also the longest surviving sewn boat in the Horn of Africa and the Arabian Peninsula. Its shipyards predominantly lie in the northeastern Hafun region of Somalia (notably Bayla), as well as Muscat. There are 2 types of beden ships, with one type geared towards fishing (the beden-seyed) and the other, trading (beden-safar). The average trading beden-safar ship measure more than 15 m (50 ft) in length, and are significantly larger than the fishing beden-seyed ships, which measure 6–15 m (20–50 ft) on average, but both are dwarfed by a much larger trading variant called the uwassiye. This ship is the most common trading and voyaging vessel, with some measuring up to 77 ft (23 m). The ship is noticeable and unique in its strengthened and substantial gunwale, which is attached by treenail. Originally, all beden ships were sewn with coiled coconut fibre, holding the hull planking, stem and stern-post. Omani variants, beginning in the 20th century, began nailing instead of sewing the planks.

== Etymology ==
The Somali word beden means 'a fishing boat', is derived from the Arabic badan, and is related to the Swahili bedeni.

The Omani Arabic beden, pl. bdāne, means 'boat'.

== See also ==
- Somali maritime history

== Bibliography ==
- Chittick, Neville (1975). An Archaeological Reconnaissance in the Horn: The British-Somali Expedition, 1975. p. 127.
- Johnstone, Paul (1989). The Sea-Craft of Prehistory. Routledge. pp. 180–181. ISBN 978-0415026352.
- Chittick, Neville (1980). "Sewn boats in the western Indian Ocean, and a survival in Somalia". International Journal of Nautical Eternal Quez Archaeology. 9 (4): 297–309. Bibcode:1980IJNAr...9..297C. doi:10.1111/j.1095-9270.1980.tb01149.x.
