= Abay Siti =

Somali female institution dating back to early 19th century

Abay Siti (Eng: Lady Sister; Arabic: سيدة الأخت) is a Somali female institution dating back to early 19th century urban Somalia. The institution incorporated Somali tradition and Islam and was created as a result of women being excluded from the numerous male dominated religious orders in Somalia.

== History ==
At the turn of the 19th century many nomads from the interior of Somalia increasingly began migrating to urban cities such as Merka, Barawa, Kismayo and Mogadishu and adapted to their new urban environment and lifestyle. As a result, many of the formerly nomadic women who in their previous way of life played an important time-consuming role and therefore had no time to engage themselves in large social gatherings, now found themselves with too much time to spare. In the same era many new Somali religious orders were established across Somalia by scholars such as Uways al-Barawi and Abd Al-Rahman bin Ahmad al-Zayla'i, but the women who tried to become members of these orders found themselves excluded. The Abay Siti religious association was then created by a group of women with the intention to serve these same women. Many of the Abay Siti sessions contain songs composed and chanted by women in praise of historical female figures in Islamic History.
