= Nasib Farah =

Somali filmmaker

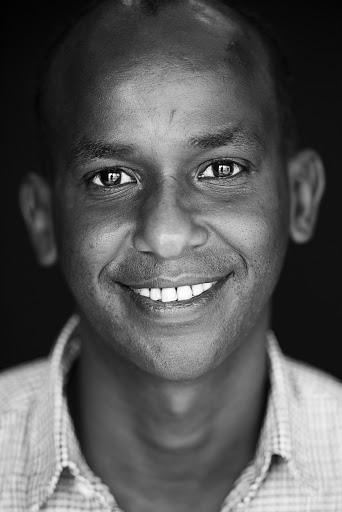
- Born: Nasib Farah; 1981 (age 44–45); Somalia
- Occupations: Director, translator, production manager, philanthropist
- Years active: 1995–present

Nasib Farah (born 1981), is a Danish–Somali filmmaker. He is notable as the director of critically acclaimed films My Cousin the Pirate, Warrior from the North and Lost warrior. Apart from filmmaking, he is also a journalist, translator, production manager, instructor assistant and philanthropist.

== Personal life ==
He was born in Somalia in 1981. In 1990 he fled Mogadishu with his family after civil war broke out in Somalia. However, he missed his family while escaping and he then escaped across the border to Ethiopia, before flying to Germany and finally settled in Denmark. Initially he was an unaccompanied refugee and later grew up at the Danish Red Cross Center Avnstrup near Lejre.

He is married to a Danish woman, with whom he has kids.

== Career ==
He trained as a salesman and worked as a freelance journalist for a few years. He later went on to create a non-profit organisation focused on helping other young Somalis through tutoring and after–school activities. Using the organisation to express his experiences, Farah started a community TV programme called 'Qaran TV' for the Somali community in Denmark.

In 2010, Farah played a leading role in the film My Cousin the Pirate, directed by Christian Sønderby Jepsen. However he always needed to work as a director rather than an actor.

In 2015, he made his maiden documentary Warriors from the North. It gained critical acclaim and was screened in several international film festivals. In 2018, he directed second documentary Lost Warrior along with Danish filmmaker Søren Steen Jespersen.

== Filmography ==
Year	Film	Role	Genre	Ref.
2010	My Cousin the Pirate	Co-director, Narrator	Documentary	
2014	The Newsroom: Off the Record	Himself	Documentary	
2014	Snapdocs - here is jonas suspected killer	Editorial staff	Documentary	
2015	Warriors from the North	Director	Documentary	
2016	Mogadishu Soldier	Translator	Documentary	
2017	The President from the North	Production manager	Documentary	
2018	Lost Warrior	Director	Documentary	
2019	Q's barbershop	Instructor Assistant	Documentary	
2021	Boksedreng fra blokken 1:10 – Rida vil være Tyson	Co-director	Documentary	
2021	Boksedreng fra blokken 2:10 – Rida vil ikke være med i en bande	Co-director	Documentary	
2021	Boksedreng fra blokken 3:10 – Rida har fødselsdag	Co-director	Documentary	
2021	Boksedreng fra blokken 4:10 – Rida bliver måske smidt ud af bokseklubben	Co-director	Documentary	
2021	Boksedreng fra blokken 5:10 – Rida bokser sin første kamp	Co-director	Documentary	
2021	Boksedreng fra blokken 6:10 – Rida laver en rapsang om Vollsmose	Co-director	Documentary	
2021	Boksedreng fra blokken 7:10 – Rida møder Vollsmoses varmeste rapper	Co-director	Documentary	
2021	Boksedreng fra blokken 8:10 – Rida bokser sin sværeste kamp	Co-director	Documentary	
2021	Boksedreng fra blokken 9:10 – Rida er til demonstration	Co-director	Documentary	
2021	Boksedreng fra blokken 10:10 – Vollsmose forever	Co-director	Documentary	
2021	Boksedreng fra blokken 12 - Bar' smil	Co-director	Documentary	
2021	Bortført af min mor og far 1:4 - Flugten fra Lalandia	Co-director	Documentary	
2021	Bortført af min mor og far 2:4 - Knivoverfaldet	Co-director	Documentary	
2021	Bortført af min mor og far 3:4 - Livet i genopdragelses lejren	Co-director	Documentary	
2021	Bortført af min mor og far 4:4 - Flugten fra Somalia	Co-director	Documentary	
