= Kaptallah =

Historic Somali clan

Kaptallah, also known as Kaptanle (Somali: Kabtanle) is a historic Somali clan. The clan established the port city of Bandar Qassim (today Bosaso) in the early 9th century, and traded with Persia, India and the Arabian Peninsula. The clan belongs to the Ahmed Harti confederation of the Darod clan. The clan inhabits the areas south and south-east of Bosaso along with the Dashishe clan.

== See also ==
- List of trading companies
- Maritime history of Somalia
