= Somaliwood =

Informal name for the Somali film industry that has developed in Columbus, Ohio

Somaliwood is an informal name for the Somali film industry that has developed in Columbus, Ohio, where a large Somali diaspora exists. Following the model of Bollywood, the name is a portmanteau of the words "Somali" and "Hollywood", the center of the American film industry.

== Overview ==
"Columbus is like the Hollywood of Somalia now because the biggest production studio is here, and that's us[...] So all the famous Somali actors are here in Columbus."

— Abdisalam Aato on Somaliwood and his film company Olol Films

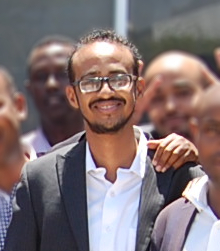
Filmmaker Abdisalam Aato, a leader in the Somaliwood movement.

The earliest forms of public film display in Somalia were Italian newsreels of key events during the colonial period in Italian Somaliland. Growing out of the Somali people's rich storytelling tradition, the first few feature-length Somali films and cinematic festivals emerged in the early 1960s, immediately after independence. Following the creation of the Somali Film Agency (SFA) regulatory body in 1975, the local film scene began to expand rapidly. In the 1970s and early 1980s, popular musicals known as Riwaayado were the main driving force behind the Somali movie industry. Epic and period films as well as international co-productions followed suit, facilitated by the proliferation of video technology and national television networks.

In the 1990s and 2000s, a new wave of more entertainment-oriented movies emerged in the Somali diaspora. Referred to as Somaliwood, this upstart cinematic movement energized the local movie scene, in the process introducing innovative storylines, production techniques and advertising strategies. The latter include cross-media marketing, with tie-in film soundtracks featuring prominent Somali music artists. Popular movies from Somaliwood include the Somali language slasher thriller Xaaskayga Araweelo, the action comedy Rajo, and Warmooge, the first Somali animated film. The young directors Abdisalam Aato of Olol Films, and Abdi Malik Isak are at the forefront of this quiet revolution. In 2010, the Somali director Mo Ali also released Shank, his first feature film set in a futuristic London.

== See also ==
- List of Somali films
- Somali Film Agency
- Hollywood-inspired names
