= Ali Said Hassan =

Somali film producer

Ali Said Hassan علي سعيد حسن
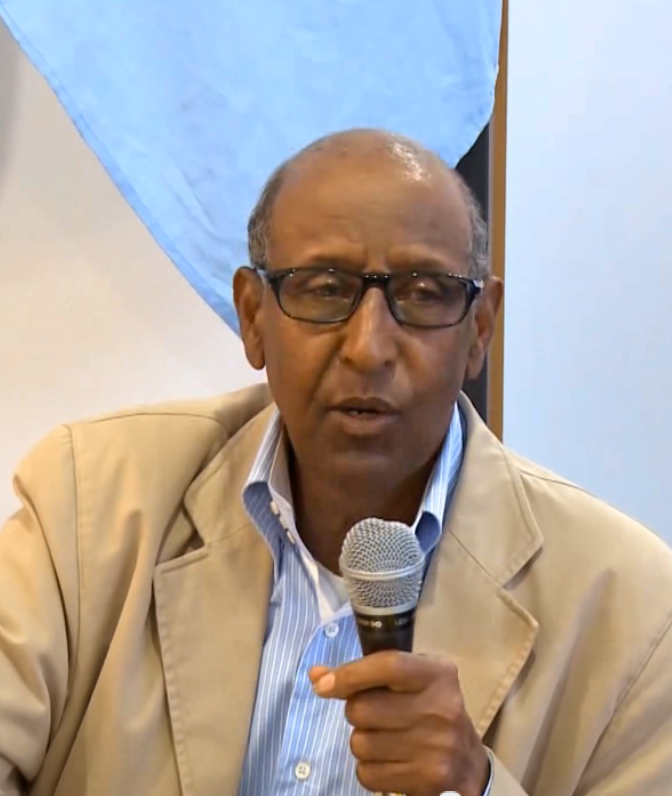
- Born: 1950 (age 75–76); Somalia
- Education: Sapienza University of Rome; Somali National University
- Occupations: photojournalist, film producer, film director

Ali Said Hassan (Somali: Cali Saciid Xasan, Arabic: علي سعيد حسن) (born 1950) is a Somali film producer, director, former photojournalist and archive collector.

== Early life ==
Hassan graduated from the Sapienza University of Rome. He initially worked on the Somali film Dan iyo Xarago. Between 1979 and 1983, he served as a representative of the Somali Film Agency in Rome. The SFA had been established a few years earlier in 1975 as an adjunct to the Ministry of Information and National Guidance. Hassan directed and produced educational films and facilitated life skill programs for higher education. In this capacity, he produced films about sustainable agricultural policy projects such as the “Ku Baahi baxa Beeraha” or “Ka Faa’ideyso Kaluunka”. The film was about agricultural and livestock farming, important sources for developing cultivation. The project was initiated in 1980 and jointly funded by the Ministry of Education, Ministry of Agriculture and Ministry of Fishery among other institutions to have a positive impact on the nation's agricultural sector.

== Biography ==
Throughout his work in the film industry, Hassan oversaw regional and district film programs to ensure the quality of film publications. He also worked with the Italian director Bernardo Bertolucci. In 1980-1981, Hassan was among the filmmakers that participated in the annual Mogadishu Pan-African and Arab Film Symposium (Mogpaafis) in Mogadishu. The film festival was organized by the Somali Film Agency and brought together an array of prominent filmmakers and movie experts from across the globe, including other parts of Northeast Africa and the Arab world, as well as Asia and Europe.

In 1984, Hassan initiated and invested in Somali visual art posters. He personally designed/printed a number of the high quality posters, as well as Somali postal stamps. One of his posters was dedicated to Istunka, a traditional pre-Islamic festival held annually in the southern town of Afgooye, situated near Mogadishu.

In 1985 to 1987, Hassan became the Somali Airlines manager for advertisement, promotion and marketing. In 1987, he was the head of a photographic exhibition on Somali history, which roughly translates as "Somalis should be cognizant of the history of Somalia". Part of the photographs were taken in Ras Aseyr to Ras Kiyanboni, northeastern coastal areas flanking the Indian Ocean. In addition, Hassan was the creator and sole proprietorship of the Golol Art Gallery, He collected and preserved more than thirty years worth of Somali history. These valuable audio-visual records included the historical lives of the founding fathers of Somalia (the Somali Youth League), as well as the history of Somali arts and crafts.

== Present ==
After a coalition of clan-based armed opposition groups ousted Siad Barre's military regime in 1991, Hassan embarked on recording events during the ensuing civil war. In 1999, he left Somalia, moving to Frankfurt, Germany, where he continued to preserve Somali documents. Hassan also started to work for the Deutsches Filmmuseum, Germany's national film museum department. Additionally, he organized the Golol Art Gallery, a cultural exhibition on the traditions of Somalia.

In 2010, Hassan started the Keydmedia Online news and audiovisual service.

== See also ==
- Yusuf Garaad Omar
