= Said Salah Ahmed =

Somali playwright, poet, educator, filmmaker

- Saciid Saalax Axmed سعيد صالح أحمد
- Born: Somalia
- Occupations: playwright, poet, educator, filmmaker

Said Salah Ahmed (Somali: Saciid Saalax Axmed, Arabic: سعيد صالح أحمد) is a Somali playwright, poet, educator and filmmaker.

== Life ==
Said Salah was previously a biology teacher in Somalia. In 1984-1985, Ahmed directed his first feature film, The Somali Darwish (alt. The Somalia Dervishes), with Amar Sneh serving as the producer. With a budget of $1.8 million, the 4-hour-and-40-minute epic was devoted to the polity of Darawiish king Diiriye Guure, i.e. the Dervish State. In the film dialogue you can hear seven languages: Somali, Arabic, Italian, English, and three regional dialects. The movie included an actual descendant of Diiriye Guure's emir, Mohammed Abdullah Hassan as its star, Sheikh Osman Mohamoud Omar, and featured hundreds of actors and extras.

Following the start of the civil war, Ahmed emigrated to Minnesota. He subsequently wrote the children's book The Lion's Share, which served as the basis for a Somali folklore-based play that he both penned and produced for the SteppingStone Theatre. Some of his poems have been translated into English by the Poetry Translation Centre.
