= Mo Ali =

Sudanese-British film director

Mohamed Ali محمد علي
- Born: Mecca, saudi arabia
- Occupation: film director
- Years active: 2010–present

Mo Ali (Somali: Maxamed Cali, Arabic: محمد علي) is a Somali-British film and television director.

== Biography ==
Ali was born in Saudi Arabia. He rose to prominence after directing several prominent grime and house music videos in the early 2000s including the first video for Lethal Bizzle's "Pow (Forward)", Skepta's "Rolex Sweep" and Boy Better Know's "Too Many Man".

He began his movie career in 2010, making his directorial debut in the drama film Shank, set in a futuristic London.

Ali is sometimes confused with the other Mo Ali, a writer and artist featured among the cast of Lint the Movie, a 2011 documentary on the cult science fiction author and philosopher Jeff Lint.

He directed the second block of COBRA series 2 starring Robert Carlisle and Victoria Hamilton for New Pictures and Sky and is currently in pre production on a new series PILOT SKIES starring Idris Elba. Rourke, Laura. "Mo Ali". independenttalent. Independent Talent Group Ltd.

== Filmography ==
- Shank (2010)
- Montana (2014)
- Somaliland: The Documentary (2018)
- Breathe (2021)
- COBRA (2021, 2 episodes)
- Hijack (2023, 2 episodes)

== See also ==
- Cinema of Somalia
