= My Cousin the Pirate =

- Min fætter er pirat
- Directed by: Christian Sønderby Jepsen
- Produced by: Helle Faber
- Narrated by: Nasib Farah
- Release date: 5 November 2010
- Running time: 40 minutes
- Countries: Denmark, Somalia
- Languages: Somali, English

My Cousin the Pirate (Danish: Min fætter er pirat) is a 2010 Danish-Somali documentary film directed by Christian Sønderby Jepsen.

== Plot ==
After the outbreak of the Somali Civil War, Nasib's family sends him to a refugee camp in Europe, but they do not have enough money to send anyone else. Years later, Somalia has become the epicenter of large-scale piracy, and there are pirates from Nasib's family. When he learns that his cousin Abdi is considering becoming a pirate, Nasib returns to his home country to dissuade him from doing so. After following his cousin closely and interacting with the pirates, Nasib makes the argument against piracy, but it carries little weight due to the lack of alternatives in the poverty-stricken country. As Abdi's first raid approaches, Nasib tries to find some hope for his family. The pirates call the hijackings "help yourself foreign aid". Nasib, humbled by his experience, realizes that he could have become a pirate had he remained in Somalia.

== Production ==
After moving to Denmark as a child during the Somali Civil War, Nasib Farah started a youth organization for young Somalis. He later founded Qaran TV, meaning "nation", which offered news, music, debates, and talk shows. Farah became interested in documentary filmmaking, and frequently heard jokes about Somali pirates, so he returned to Somalia to see if anyone in his extended family had become a pirate. Danish TV2 and the Danish Film Institute supported the production of My Cousin the Pirate. It was produced by Helle Faber and directed by Christian Sønderby Jepsen.

== Release and reception ==
The film was screened at the Bergen International Film Festival in Norway. Nasrin Billie wrote that "the film gives a gripping insight to the plight of the Somali people."
