= Geedka nolosha =

- Directed by: Abdulkadir Ahmed Said
- Written by: Abdulkadir Ahmed Said
- Produced by: Jubba Enterprises/Somali Film Agency
- Starring: Hasan Elmi Kori Sabrie
- Cinematography: Fuad Abdulaziz Mohamed
- Edited by: Roberto Missiroli
- Music by: Cali Ganey
- Release date: 1988
- Running time: 23 minutes
- Country: Somalia
- Language: Somali

Geedka nolosha (1988), or The Tree of Life, is a short film from Somali writer and director Abdulkadir Ahmed Said. In 1988, it won the Prize of the City of Torino in the Best Film - International Short Film Competition category at the Torino International Festival of Young Cinema.

== Plot ==
A man leaves his home and walks through a village, past various animals, as well as people going about their daily tasks, and stops to greet some of them. Eventually he comes to a forest where he selects a tree and starts to chop it. The sound of the axe echoes through the surrounding area, startling villagers and animals. After great effort, he successfully fells the tree and the sound of it crashing is particularly upsetting to those around. A great wind rushes through the forest and the man wraps himself in his sheet to protect himself. When he removes the sheet, he finds himself alone in the middle of a desert that he does not recognize. As he runs up and down the dunes looking for an escape, the film is intercut with scenes of trees being cut through simple and mechanized forestry, as well as scenes of famine and death. After crying out in despair and rolling down a dune, he comes across a small plant growing in the sand. He surrounds it with his body and sheet to protect it.

== Other ==
Geedka nolosha was shot on 16 mm film.
