= Sentinels of Bronze =

- Directed by: Romolo Marcellini
- Written by: Gian Gaspare Napolitano; Marcello Orano; Sandro Sandri; Romolo Marcellini
- Starring: Fosco Giachetti; Giovanni Grasso; Doris Duranti; Hassan Mohamed
- Cinematography: Renato Del Frate
- Production company: Fono Roma
- Distributed by: Generalcine
- Release date: 21 August 1937
- Running time: 92 minutes
- Country: Italy
- Language: Italian

Sentinels of Bronze (Italian: Sentinelle di bronzo) is a 1937 Italian war film directed by Romolo Marcellini and starring Fosco Giachetti, Giovanni Grasso and Doris Duranti.

== History ==
In the 1930s and 1940s, early Somali actors and film technicians co-operated with Italian crews to domestically produce Fascist films. Among the latter productions were Dub'aad and Sentinels of Bronze. The movie "Sentinels of Bronze" (Sentinelle di bronzo) was awarded in the Festival di Venezia of 1937 as the "Best Italian colonial Film", winning an Italian Cup.

The film is a propaganda work set in the days leading up to the outbreak of the Second Italo-Ethiopian War.

=== Topic ===
In an incident modeled on the Wal Wal incident, an Italian outpost is besieged by large numbers of Abyssinian troops, but the garrison refuse to surrender. It was part of a series of films set in Italy's African Empire during the Fascist era.

== Cast ==
- Fosco Giachetti as Capitano Negri
- Giovanni Grasso as Sergente Amato
- Doris Duranti as Dahabò
- Hassan Mohamed as Elmi
- Mohamed Aghi Alì as Islam
- Ali Ibrahim as Giama
- Elmi Ahmed as Ras Sciferrà
- Abdullah Ali as Hawariat

== Bibliography ==
- Palumbo, Patrizia. A Place in the Sun: Africa in Italian Colonial Culture from Post-unification to the Present. University of California Press, 2003.
