= Al-Zayla'i =

14th-century Somali Muslim theologian

Personal life
- Died: 1342
- Era: 14th century
- Region: Zeila
- Main interest(s): Islamic philosophy, Islamic Jurisprudence

Religious life
- Religion: Islam
- Jurisprudence: Hanafi

Muslim leader
- Influenced: Jamal al-Din al-Zaylaʽi

Al-Zayla'i (Note: Arabic: أبو عمرو عثمان بن علي بن محجن البارعي, romanized: Abu Amr Uthman ibn Ali ibn Muhjin al-Bari’i) (died 1342) was a 14th-century Islamic scholar, theologian and jurist from Zeila in modern-day Somaliland.

== Biography ==
Al-Zayla'i traveled extensively throughout the Muslim world during his lifetime. He eventually settled in Cairo, Egypt, where he joined other Somali students at the Riwaq al-Zayla'i of the Al-Azhar University.

Uthman wrote several books on Islamic jurisprudence, one of which is considered to be the single most authoritative text on the Hanafi school of Islam. Consisting of four volumes, it is known as the Tabayin al-Haqa’iq li Sharh Kanz al-Daqa’iq. In it he narrated the saying of Abu Hanifah that the Qiblah of the people of the East is West and the Qiblah of the people of the West is East and the Qiblah of the people of the North is South and the Qiblah of the people of the South is North.

== Sources ==
- Mukhtar, Mohamed Haji (1987). Arabic Sources on Somalia. African Studies Association.
