= The Somali Dervish =

- Directed by: Said Salah, Amar Sneh
- Release date: 1985
- Running time: 270 minutes
- Countries: Somalia; India
- Languages: Italian; English; Arabic; Somali

The Somali Dervish was an epic film directed by Said Salah and Amar Sneh between 1983 and 1985. It is one of the few full-length feature films to have been produced in Somalia.

With a budget of $1.8 million, the 4-hour-and-40-minute epic followed the life of Muhammad Abdullah Hassan, leader of the Somali Dervish movement. Seven languages were used for film dialogue: Somali, Arabic, Italian, English, and three regional dialects. The movie included an actual descendant of Mohammed Abdullah Hassan as its star, Sheikh Osman Mohamoud Omar, and featured hundreds of actors and extras. Once thought to be lost, the movie was found in the National Film Archive of India in late 2019.
