= The Parching Winds of Somalia =

- Produced by: Charles Geshekter
- Release date: 1984
- Running time: 30 minutes
- Country: Somalia
- Language: English

The Parching Winds of Somalia (1984) is a documentary film produced by Charles Geshekter.

== Subject matter ==
The film provides a close look at how the nomadic inhabitants of Somalia have withstood the ravages of a harsh desert environment and the encroachment of European imperial forces by synthesizing knowledge of the past, Muslim practices, and skillful livestock management in a successful fusion of traditional values with modern techniques.

== Form ==
The Parching Winds of Somalia features extensive location footage in Somalia, historical photographs, interviews, and contemporary Somali music.

== Other ==
The film is rated ages 14 and up in the United States. It was released on video in 1993 by PBS Video VHS.

== Sources ==
- National Endowment for the Humanities (1987). Media log: a guide to film, television, and radio programs supported by the National Endowment for the Humanities. The Endowment.
- R R Bowker Publishing (1995). Bowker's Complete Video Directory (Volume 2). R.R. Bowker. ISBN 0-8352-3588-2.
