= Somali Film Agency =

The Somali Film Agency (SFA) was a film regulatory body based in Mogadishu, Somalia.

== History ==
Following a bloodless military coup d'état in 1969, the production, distribution and importation of films in the country were nationalized by the new-established Supreme Revolutionary Council. Privately owned movie theaters were subsequently replaced with government-controlled film houses, and about 500 films were projected annually.

The Somali Film Agency (SFA) was established in 1975 as an adjunct to the federal Ministry of Information and National Guidance, growing out of the Ministry's visual aids arm. The SFA's duties included overseeing the importation, distribution and censorship of movies in the country. It later also oversaw the production of both long and short films. Most of the imported films were brought in from Egypt, Italy, the Soviet Union and East Germany. To facilitate processing and post-production, the SFA also forged a working partnership with British Films LTD, a British movie company.

Between 1979 and 1983, the Somali filmmaker Ali Said Hassan served as a representative of the Somali Film Agency in Rome. The Somali Film Agency also annually organized the Mogadishu Pan-African and Arab Film Symposium (Mogpaafis) in Mogadishu. The film festival brought together an array of prominent filmmakers and movie experts from across the globe, including other parts of Northeast Africa and the Arab world, as well as Asia and Europe.

== See also ==
- Cinema of Somalia
- List of Somali films
